= Julis-Rabinowitz Center for Public Policy and Finance =

Economic research institute at Princeton University

Coordinates: 40.34914°N 74.65362°W

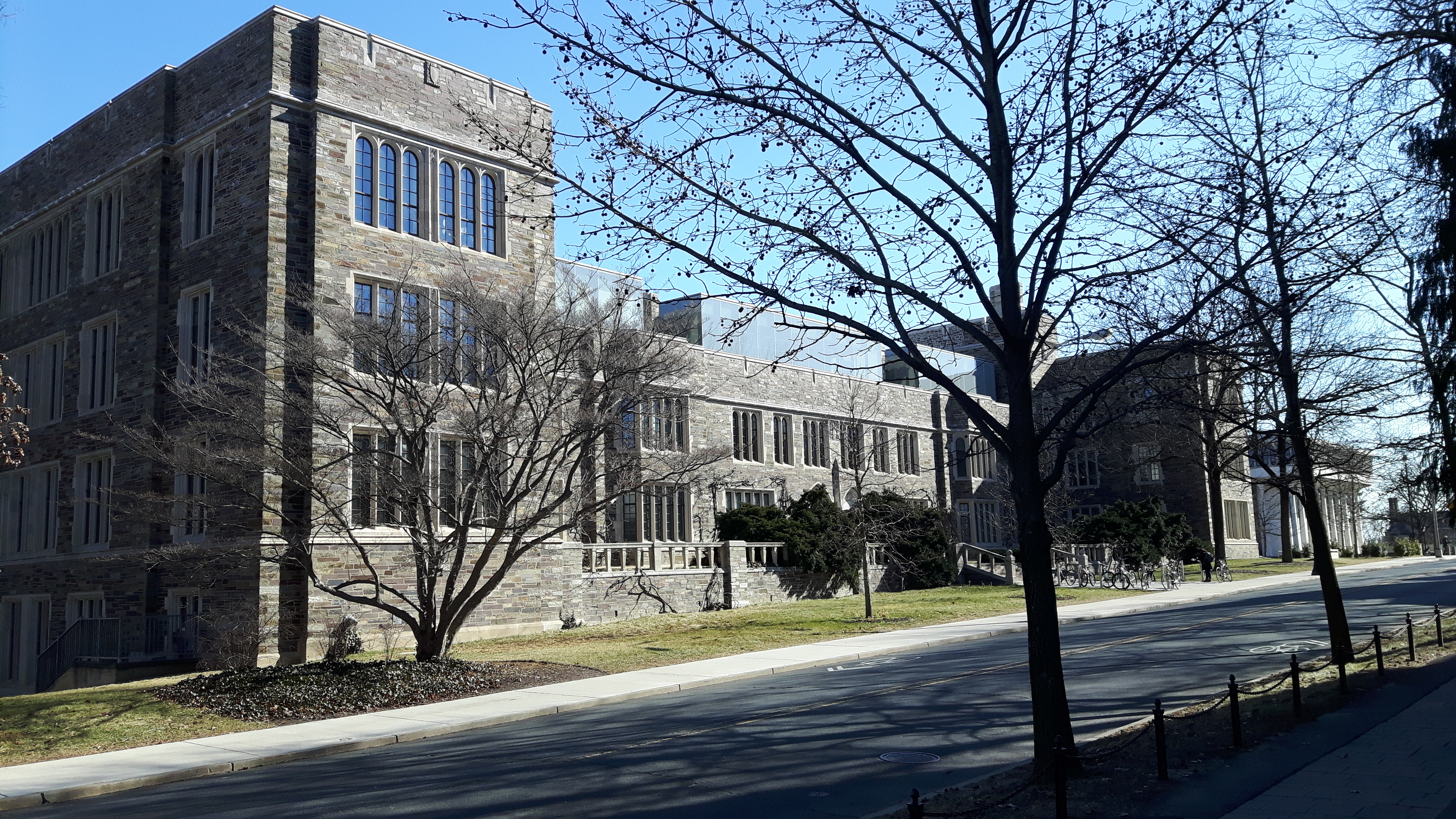
- Julis Romo Rabinowitz Building, home to the Julis-Rabinowitz Center
- Type: Private
- Established: 2011
- Parent institution: Princeton University
- Director: Atif Mian
- Faculty: approx. 21 professors and researchers
- Students: approx. 50 graduate and undergraduate students (2018–2019)
- Location: Princeton, New Jersey, United States
- Website: jrc.princeton.edu

The Julis-Rabinowitz Center for Public Policy and Finance (JRC) is a research center at the Princeton School of Public and International Affairs (SPIA) of Princeton University. Founded in 2011, the JRC primarily promotes research on public policy as it relates to financial markets and macroeconomics. The center has also expanded its research and teaching to multiple disciplines, including economics, operations research, political science, history, and ethics.

== History ==
=== Founding ===
In April 2011, Mitch Julis, a Princeton alum and current partner of Canyon Capital Advisors, a Los Angeles–based hedge fund, made a gift of $10 million to the Princeton School of Public and International Affairs. His funds were used to create a center that sought to analyze and improve the nation's financial and public policies. Named for Julis’ parents, the Julis-Rabinowitz Center began its operations in the 2011–2012 academic year, and has since maintained close relations with the School of Public and International Affairs, the Bendheim Center for Finance, and the Princeton University Department of Economics. Christina Paxson, former dean of the Princeton School of Public and International Affairs and current president of Brown University helped to establish the organization which aimed to increase opportunities for research and teaching. The center was originally located at Princeton's Frick Chemistry Laboratory. In 2017, the JRC moved to its permanent location at the Julis Romo Rabinowitz Building.

=== Organizational structure ===
The current director of the JRC is the John H. Laporte Jr. Class of 1967 Professor of Economics, Public Policy and Finance Atif R. Mian. Professor Mian holds a bachelor's degree in Mathematics and a Ph.D. in Economics from the Massachusetts Institute of Technology. Much of his research focuses on finance and macroeconomy, analyzing housing trends, mortgage data, and the 2008 financial crisis. His research has been cited in The New York Times, Financial Times, The Wall Street Journal, and the Economist.

The JRC is also supported by an External Advisory Council, which includes Robert A. Johnson at the Institute for New Economic Thinking (INET), Philip Bennett at the European Bank for Reconstruction and Development (EBRD), and Joyce Chang at JP Morgan Chase & Co.

== Research ==
The goal of the JRC is to provide opportunities for research at the intersection of public policy and finance through its events, workshops, and initiatives. The research conducted at the JRC has been published in numerous news outlets, including Barron's, MarketWatch, The Washington Post, and Institutional Investor.

=== Scholars ===
Its scholars include a wide array of economists, political scientists, historians, and industry experts. Professors associated with the JRC have won a number of prestigious and international awards, including the Clark Medal (Yuliy Sannikov, 2016), the Moynihan Prize (Alan Krueger, 2016), and the Bipartisan Health Policy Leadership Award from the National Alliance of Health Policy (Uwe Reinhardt, 2017). The center also is home to Alan Krueger, the former Assistant Secretary of the Treasury for Economic Policy; Alan Blinder, a former member of the Council of Economic Advisers and Vice Chairman of the Federal Reserve System; Markus Brunnermeier, research fellow at the Bank for International Settlements; Harold James, the current Historian at the International Monetary Fund; and Cecilia Rouse, a former member of the Council of Economic Advisers and current dean of the Princeton School of Public and International Affairs. The JRC is also home to a number of External Advisory Council members who work in government, industry, and academia.

=== Projects ===
==== Washington Center Grant ====
Atif Mian, director of the JRC and professor of economics and of public affairs, runs the Washington Center Grant research project. Using household data at the county-level, he seeks to describe the role of household debt in the 2008 financial crisis. In 2014, he published his findings in House of Debt with Amir Sufi, at the University of Chicago's Booth School of Business. Because of his research, Mian has been named one of the International Monetary Fund's "top 25 bright, young economists."

==== Macro, Money and Finance ====
The Princeton Initiative: Macro, Money and Finance organizes an annual meeting for students to discuss trends in modern finance and macroeconomic models in the context of financial crises. The program is organized by Markus Brunnermeier, Professor of Economics at Princeton University, and Yuliy Sannikov, Professor of Economics at Stanford University.

==== Economics of Insurance Workshop ====
In June 2018, the JRC organized the inaugural financial economics of insurance workshop. Organized by Motohiro Yogo (Princeton) and Ralph S. Koijen (New York University), the workshop focuses on the importance of the insurance sector in understanding market incentives, pricing, and asset allocation. The project is funded by the National Science Foundation and the Bendheim Center for Finance.

=== Partnerships ===
The JRC currently leads a partnership with the African School of Economics (ASE). Since 2016, the JRC and the ASE have engaged in collaborative research and numerous training initiatives, as well as a new visiting scholar program.

=== Annual Conference ===
The JRC's annual conference is co-hosted with Microsoft Research in New York City. It aims to bring together researchers, policy experts, and market practitioners to discuss some of the most pressing economic issues in the current world. Past topics including "Escalating Risks: China's Economy, Society and Financial System" and "The Future of Globalization: Trade, Finance and Politics." Some past keynote speakers include Lawrence H. Summers of Harvard University; Robert Hall of Stanford University; Paul Krugman of Princeton University; and Benoît Cœuré of the European Central Bank.

== Academics ==
The JRC trains a cohort of undergraduate and graduate associates can conduct research with faculty and network with professionals in the financial-services industry. Past associates have been named Rhodes Scholars and Schwarzman Scholars.

Undergraduate students at Princeton are able to apply for an Undergraduate Certificate in Finance (UCF) with a Public Policy and Finance Track. This program is co-directed by the JRC and the Bendheim Center for Finance. It requires students to take relevant courses in a number of fields, such as public finance and the history of financial crises. Graduate students are able to take intensive courses sponsored by the JRC. They may also take part in the Princeton Initiative: Macro, Money and Finance, a program for students looking to further develop their modeling skills and financial knowledge.
