= Bendheim Center for Finance =

Research center of Princeton University

Coordinates: 40°20′57.2″N 74°39′19.8″W

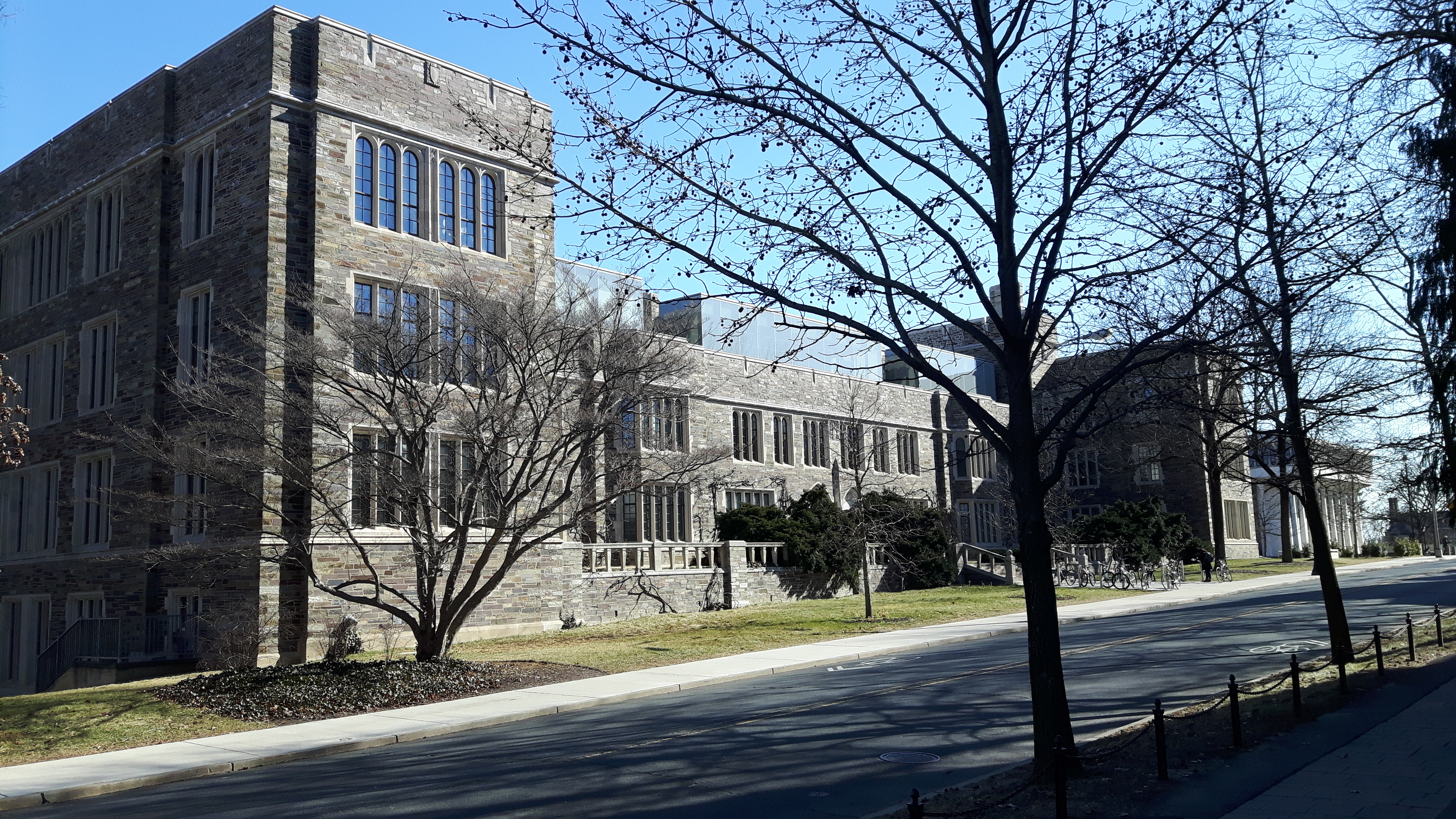
- The Julis Romo Rabinowitz Building accommodating Princeton's Bendheim Center for Finance
- Founder: Ben Bernanke
- Established: 1997
- Mission: Research and education in money and finance
- Director: Markus Brunnermeier
- Faculty: Mark A. Aguiar, Yacine Ait-Sahalia, Sanjeev Arora, Alan S. Blinder, Markus K. Brunnermeier, Rene Carmona, Jianqing Fan, Maryam Farboodi, Harold James, Jakub Kastl, Nobuhiro Kiyotaki, Alan B. Krueger, Adrien Matray, Atif Mian, Stephen Morris, John Mulvey, Ulrich Müller, Arvind Narayanan, David Schoenherr, Mykhaylo Shkolnikov, Christopher A. Sims, Ronnie Sircar, Robert Vanderbei, Mark W. Watson, Matt Weinberg, Wei Xiong, Motohiro Yogo
- Address: 20 Washington Road, Princeton, NJ 08544, US
- Location: Princeton University, Princeton, NJ, US
- Website: bcf.princeton.edu

Bendheim Center for Finance (BCF) is an interdisciplinary center at Princeton University. It was established in 1997 at the initiative of Ben Bernanke. Yacine Ait-Sahalia served as the center's inaugural director (1998–2014). The center is dedicated to research and education in the area of money and finance, in lieu of there not being a full professional business school at Princeton.

== Faculty ==
While most of the Bendheim Center's faculty comes from Princeton's department of economics, the center also draws its faculty from other fields such as psychology, computer science, and operations research.

The Bendheim Center for Finance's current and past faculty have been honored with prizes, fellowships, and awards. The Nobel Prize in Economic Sciences has been awarded to Daniel Kahneman (2002), Paul Krugman (2008), and Christopher Sims (2011). The John Bates Clark Medal has been given to Yuliy Sannikov in 2016. Sannikov (2015) and Harrison Hong (2009) have been awarded the Fischer Black Prize. Markus Brunnermeier obtained the Germán Bernácer Prize (2008). Daniel Kahneman has been honored with the Presidential Medal of Freedom (2013). Markus Brunnermeier (2004) and Wei Xiong (2012) won the Smith Breeden Prize. The Distinguished Paper Brattle Prize. was won by Atif Mian (2010), Markus Brunnermeier (2013), and jointly by Martin Schmalz and David Sraer (2017).

Various faculty members have been named Fellow of the Econometric Society, Fellow of the National Academy of Sciences, Fellow of the American Statistical Association, Fellow of the Society for Industrial and Applied Mathematics, Fellow of the Institute of Mathematical Statistics, Distinguished Fellow of the American Economic Association, Guggenheim Fellow, or Sloan Fellow.

== Research ==
The Bendheim Center for Finance obtained academic reputation within few years, benefiting from its faculty's focus on financial imperfections and behavioral elements which experienced a boost in public interest and academic research after the burst of the dot-com bubble in 2000. Similarly, the faculty's empirical research on housing and theories incorporating financial frictions and the financial sector into macro and monetary models contributed to the Bendheim Center's reputation as these are at the heart of the rethinking of macroeconomics, monetary economics, financial regulation, and the international financial architecture triggered by the great recession.

== Academic programs ==
The Bendheim Center for Finance offers teaching and supervision to undergraduate and graduate students. The center has close ties with Princeton's Department of Economics.

=== Undergraduate certificate in finance ===
Princeton University's undergraduate students of all departments can earn a certificate attesting their proficiency in the area of finance from the Bendheim Center. Prerequisites for admission focus on skills in mathematics, probability theory and statistics. The two core courses deal with asset pricing and corporate finance. The elective courses cover areas such as behavioral finance, data science, portfolio theory, money and banking, financial crises, risk management, information technologies for finance, public policy, ethics in finance, and the Chinese economic and financial system. Undergraduate students also have the opportunity to take part in the BCF's mentorship program, which connects students and alumni. Currently, around 90 students take part in the undergraduate certificate in finance program. While approximately two thirds of the students have an economics or finance background, many come from other areas including computer science, history, mathematics, and engineering.

=== Master in finance ===
The master in finance program particularly addresses students aiming at a career in quantitative finance and asset management, risk management, FinTechs, macroeconomic and financial forecasting, quantitative trading, or applied research. While the program generally takes four semesters, a two-semester version is available to students with strong prior knowledge. The BCF's Master in Finance puts strong emphasis on financial economics, data analysis and technology, and computational methods. Due to the quantitative focus of the courses, the master program is also attractive for students with strong corresponding prior knowledge such as physicists. Approximately 35 students corresponding to 5 percent of applicants are admitted to the program each year. The New York Sun describes the program as a popular alternative to an MBA, particularly for students striving for a career in trading or in financial companies.

=== Ph.D. program ===
The BCF does not offer a distinct Ph.D. program, but provides a home for Ph.D. students in economics, operations research, mathematics, and further fields who are interested in finance-related topics. In addition to supervision, the BCF offers courses on finance and related topics. The center also hosts a weekly student research workshop.

== Seminars, lecture series, and conferences ==
In addition to the student research workshop, the BCF hosts a weekly finance seminar. The center organizes the "Princeton Finance Lectures" delivered by one outstanding finance scholar each year. In the past years, lectures were given by Raghuram Rajan, Jeremy Stein, Ben Bernanke, Andrei Shleifer, Robert Shiller, Robert Engle, Robert C. Merton, and Lars Peter Hansen. The BCF regularly hosts conferences. Past conferences dealt with topics such as escalating risks in China and FinTech. Each year, the BCF co-organizes the "Princeton Initiative: Macro, Money and Finance", which brings together about 75 Ph.D. students from various universities to explore the latest research at the intersection between macro, monetary, and financial economics. In the center's career speaker series, guests from industry, government, and academia cover a broad range of topics, addressing both graduate and undergraduate students.
