= Department of Economics (Princeton University) =

Academic department at Princeton University

Coordinates: 40.34835°N 74.65467°W

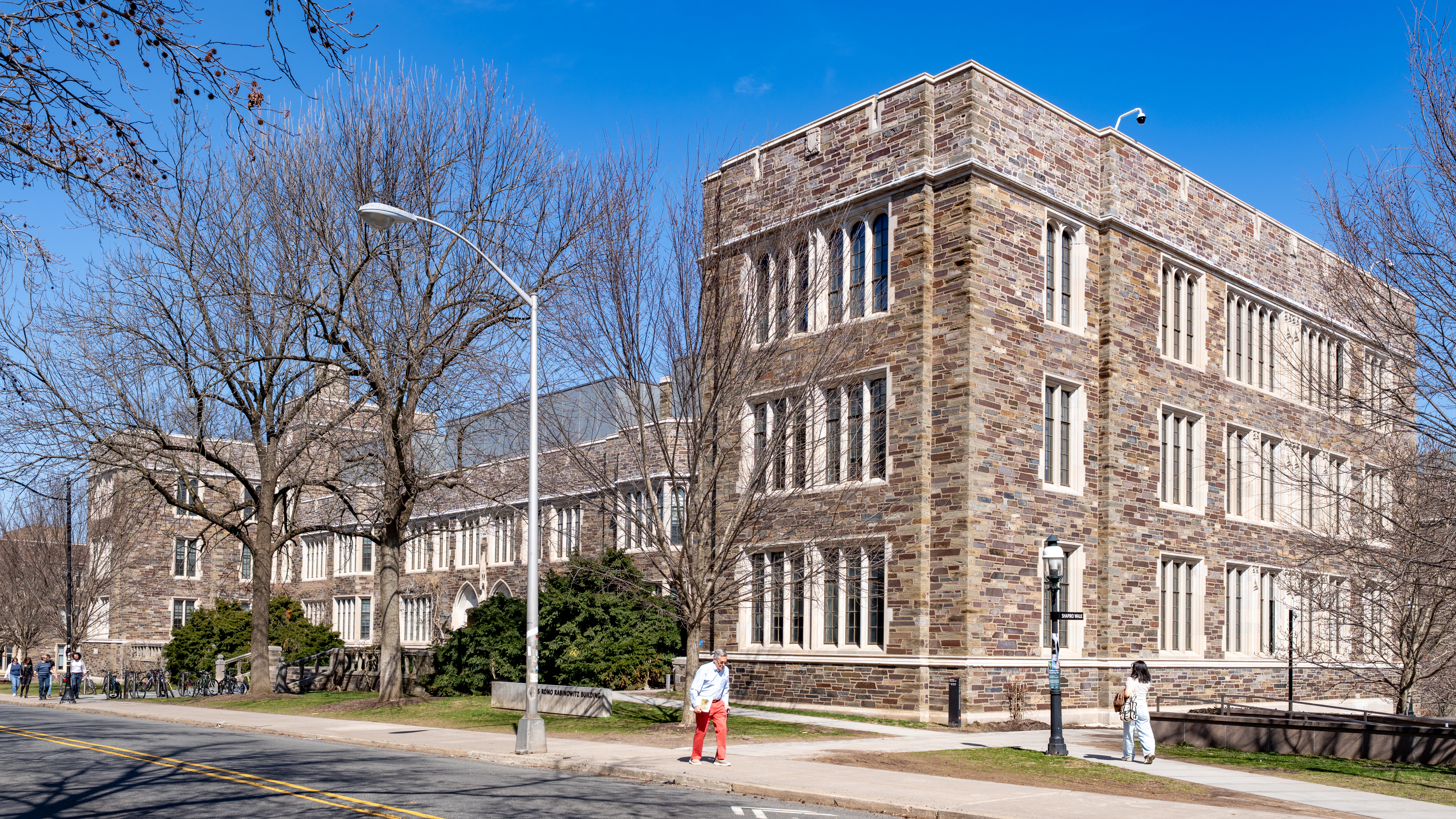
- The Julis Romo Rabinowitz Building at Princeton University, home to the Department of Economics
- Type: Private
- Established: 1913
- Parent institution: Princeton University
- Faculty: 65 full-time faculty members
- Students: Approximately 300+ undergraduate students and 141 graduate students
- Location: Princeton, New Jersey, United States
- Website: economics.princeton.edu

The Department of Economics is an academic department of Princeton University, an Ivy League institution located in Princeton, New Jersey. The department is renowned as one of the premier programs worldwide for the study of economics. The university offers undergraduate A.B. degrees, as well as graduate degrees at the Ph.D. level. It is often considered one of the "big five" schools in the field, along with the faculties at the University of Chicago, Harvard University, Stanford University and MIT. According to the 2023–2024 U.S. News & World Report, its graduate department is ranked as the joint No. 4 in the field of economics, in a four-way tie between it, the University of Chicago, Yale University, and the University of California, Berkeley.

The department is centered at the Julis Romo Rabinowitz Building & Louis A. Simpson International Building, formerly 20 Washington Road, which also houses the Princeton Institute for International and Regional Studies, the Bendheim Center for Finance, the Center for Health and Wellbeing, and the Julis-Rabinowitz Center for Public Policy and Finance. It is also home to the Industrial Relations Library.

== History ==
Since the university's founding in 1746, many courses in the social sciences, including history and politics, were taught in the department of Jurisprudence and Political Economy. Coursework specifically in political economy became available in 1819. When Woodrow Wilson became a professor in 1890, additional courses were added to the curriculum, including the History of Political Economy. By 1913, the department became independent from history and politics, forming the Department of Economics and Social Institutions.

== Academics ==
The undergraduate program is one of the most prestigious programs for the study of economics in the country and in the world. Economics is the most popular concentration (Princeton's version of an academic major) at the undergraduate level. Because the university does not have a business school, the economics concentration attracts many students who are interested in careers in investment banking, management consulting, finance, technology, and more. The curriculum itself is theoretical in nature, requiring students complete quantitative courses up to multivariate calculus. In partnership with the Bendheim Center for Finance, the department also offers an Undergraduate Finance Certificate.

The graduate program in economics trains Ph.D. students for careers in academia, government, and industry. It receives approximately 800 applications for a class of 20 to 25 students who come from over 30 different countries around the world. The program has numerous fields of specialization and has been particularly strong in the areas of Macroeconomics, Industrial Relations, and International Finance. Graduate students who pursue academic careers have historically had placement records at some of the world's leading universities including Harvard, Yale, MIT, and Cornell.

The department also oversees a number of centers and initiatives, including:

Dial Lodge
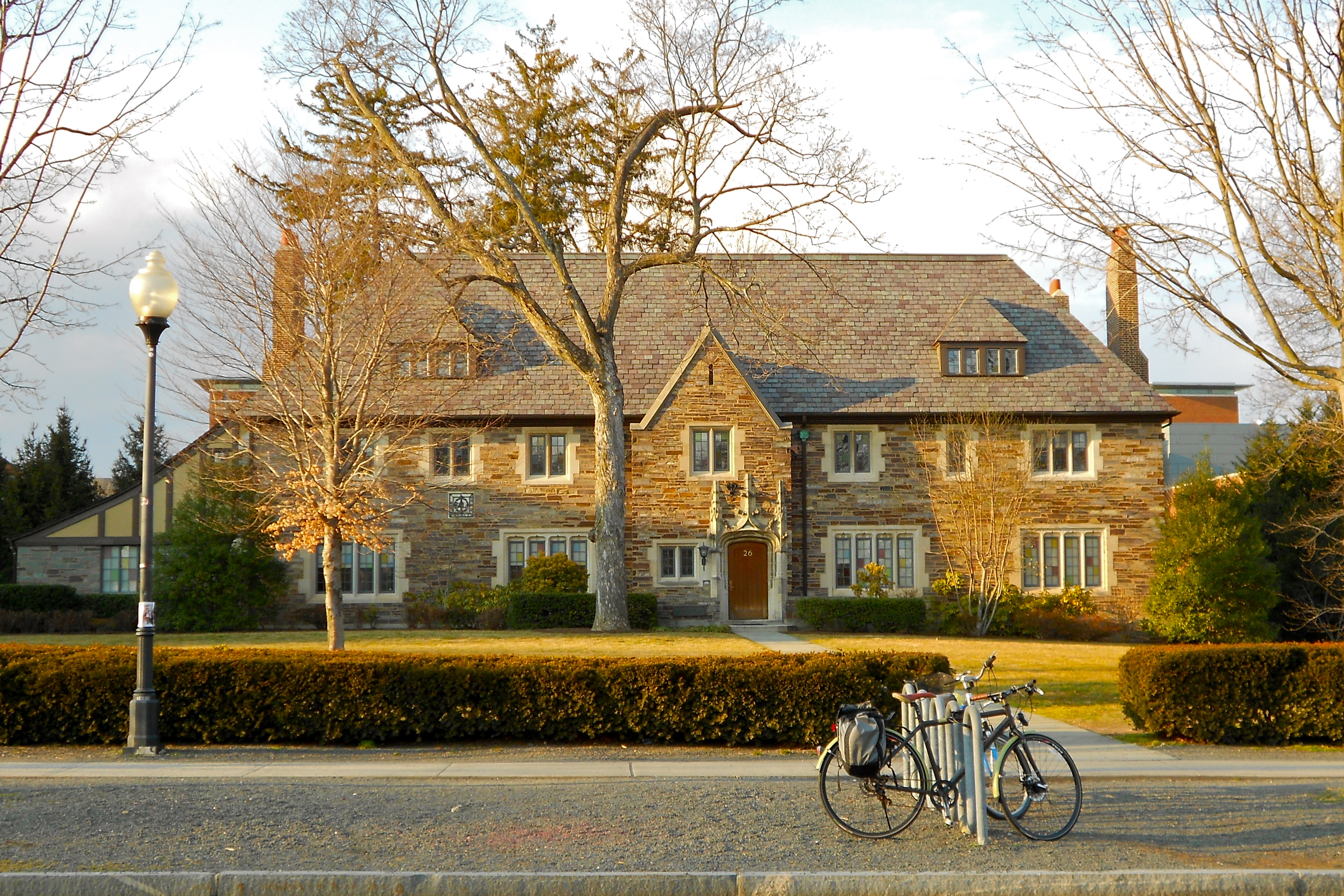
- Home to the Bendheim Center for Finance in Princeton, NJ

- Bendheim Center for Finance
- The Benjamin H. Griswold III, Class of 1933, Center for Economic Policy Studies
- The Gregory C. Chow Econometric Research Program
- Julis-Rabinowitz Center for Public Policy and Finance
- Center for Health and Wellbeing
- William S. Dietrich II Economic Theory Center
- Industrial Relations Section
- International Economics Section
- Office of Population Research
- Political Economy Program
- Princeton Experimental Laboratory for the Social Sciences (PExL)
- Research Program in Development Studies
- The Gregory C. and Paula K. Chow Macroeconomic Research Program
- Louis A. Simpson Center for the Study of Macroeconomics

== Rankings ==
=== National Rankings ===
The 2023-2024 U.S. News & World Report places its graduate department as No. 4 nationwide in the field of Economics, tied there with the University of Chicago, Yale University, and the University of California, Berkeley. The National Research Council's rankings place the university at No. 2 in the S-Rank (Scholars Rank) and No. 2 in the Research Rank.

=== International Rankings ===
In the 2018 Q.S. World University Rankings, the department places as No. 3 in the world in the fields of Economics and Econometrics. The 2018 Times Higher Education World University Rankings ranks the department as No. 7 globally. It has been ranked by RePEc among the top ten economics Departments in the world.

== Notable faculty ==
=== Nobel Memorial Prize in Economic Sciences ===
Among the department's past and current faculty members are several recipients of the Nobel Memorial Prize in Economic Sciences:

Sveriges Riksbank Prize in Economic Sciences in Memory of Alfred Nobel laureates
| Year | Laureate | Prize share | Prize motivation | Other notability | Department's affiliation |
|---|---|---|---|---|---|
| 2022 | Ben Bernanke | 1/3 | "for research on banks and financial crises" | 14th Chairman of the Federal Reserve (2006–2014); 23rd Chairman of the Council of Economic Advisers (2005–2006) | Professor of Economics and Public Affairs (1985–2002); Department's chair (1996–2002) |
| 2022 | Philip H. Dybvig | 1/3 | "for research on banks and financial crises" | Director of the Institute of Financial Studies at China's Southwest University of Finance and Economics (2010–2021) | Assistant Professor of Economics (1980–1981) |
| 2015 | Angus Deaton | 1/1 | "for his analysis of consumption, poverty, and welfare" | | Dwight D. Eisenhower Professor of Economics and International Affairs |
| 2011 | Thomas J. Sargent | 1/2 | "for their empirical research on cause and effect in the macroeconomy" | Erwin Plein Nemmers Prize in Economics winner (1996) | Visiting Professor of Economics |
| 2011 | Christopher A. Sims | 1/2 | "for their empirical research on cause and effect in the macroeconomy" | | Harold B. Helms ’20 Professor of Economics and Banking |
| 2008 | Paul Krugman | 1/1 | "for his analysis of trade patterns and location of economic activity" | John Bates Clark Medal recipient (1991); Columnist for The New York Times | Professor of Economics and International Affairs Emeritus |
| 2007 | Eric Maskin | 1/3 | "for having laid the foundations of mechanism design theory" | | Visiting Lecturer with the rank of Professor of Economics |
| 1994 | John Forbes Nash Jr. | 1/3 | "for their pioneering analysis of equilibria in the theory of non-cooperative games" | | Senior Research Mathematician |
| 1979 | W. Arthur Lewis | 1/2 | "for their pioneering research into economic development research with particular consideration of the problems of developing countries" | First and (so far) only black person to win a Nobel Prize in any scientific field | James Madison Professor of Political Economy |

Other notably past and present faculty members include:

- Alan Krueger former James Madison Professor of Political Economy
- Mark Aguiar
- Orley Ashenfelter
- Alan Blinder, the 15th Vice Chairman of the Federal Reserve
- Markus Brunnermeier
- Roland Bénabou
- Leah Platt Boustan
- Markus Brunnermeier
- Anne Case
- Janet M. Currie
- Henry Farber
- John Kenneth Galbraith, a leading academic on post-Keynesian economics; former United States Ambassador to India
- Mikhail Golosov
- Gene Grossman
- Faruk Gül
- Kate Ho
- Bo E. Honoré
- Nobuhiro Kiyotaki
- Henrik Kleven
- Ilyana Kuziemko
- Alexandre Mas
- Atif Mian
- Wolfgang Pesendorfer
- Stephen J. Redding
- Uwe Reinhardt, a scholar on health care economics and Medicare
- Richard Rogerson
- Esteban Rossi-Hansberg
- Cecilia Rouse, the 30th Chair of the Council of Economic Advisers
- Harold Tafler Shapiro
- Mark W. Watson
- Wei Xiong
- Leeat Yariv
- Motohiro Yogo

== See also ==
- MIT Department of Economics
- Chicago School of Economics
- Paris School of Economics
- London School of Economics
- University of Pennsylvania Economics Department
- University of Rochester Economics Department
