= The Euro and the Battle of Ideas =

2016 book about politics in the European Union

- Author: Markus Brunnermeier, Harold James, Jean-Pierre Landau
- Language: English
- Genre: History
- Publisher: Princeton University Press
- Publication date: 2016
- Publication place: United States
- Pages: 448
- ISBN: 978-0691172927

The Euro and the Battle of Ideas is a book by Markus Brunnermeier, Professor of Economics at Princeton University; Harold James, Professor of History at Princeton University; and Jean-Pierre Landau, a former Deputy Governor of the Bank of France, a member of the board of directors of the Bank for International Settlements (BIS). The book is about the philosophical differences between countries in the European Union, particularly Germany and France, and how their contrasting outlooks on political philosophy have shaped the Eurozone. The book also provides context to how the ideas that led to the creation of the European Union have influenced and been influenced by ideas in the United States, the United Kingdom, the International Monetary Fund (IMF), and the European Central Bank (ECB).

== Summary ==
The book begins with the historical roots of German-French differences, highlighting the cultural and philosophical aspects which distinguish the two nations. Their divergent systems of philosophical thoughts have spurred differences in economic ideologies in regards to federalism versus centralism, monetary and fiscal policies, and austerity versus stimulus. The authors argue that "there is no single, coherent economic philosophy within Europe. Rather, different nations have retained their own distinct economic philosophers and view European-level institutions--and ways to improve them--in this light." The books continus with an analysis on how these philosophies have manifested themselves in the European Union, mainly through the Maastricht negotiations and the commitment to a currency union. They expound upon the divergent ideas of economics and politics have contributed to different models of governance within Europe, and that "the German view and the French view actually need each other to be sustainable."

== Critical response ==
Ben Bernanke, former Chairman of the U.S. Federal Reserve praised the book for its insightful contribution to the history of economics: "International divergences in economic policy are as much the result of differences in intellectual frameworks as of variation in economic circumstances. This valuable book explains the critical differences in national economic philosophies and how they have conditioned policy choices over the past decade."

Lawrence Summers, former United States Secretary of the Treasury, claimed that "This is the best and most important book so far on an experiment with profound economic and geopolitical implications."

== Awards ==
The book has been a recipient of a number of awards, including Bloomberg’s Best Books of 2017, Project Syndicate’s Best Reads in 2017 (chosen by Jean Pisani-Ferry), The Financial Times' Best Economics Books of 2016, and The Economist’s Economics and Business Books of the Year 2016.

== See also ==
- European Union
- Eurozone crisis
- French history
- German history
- History of Economics
