= Yacine Aït-Sahalia =

American economist

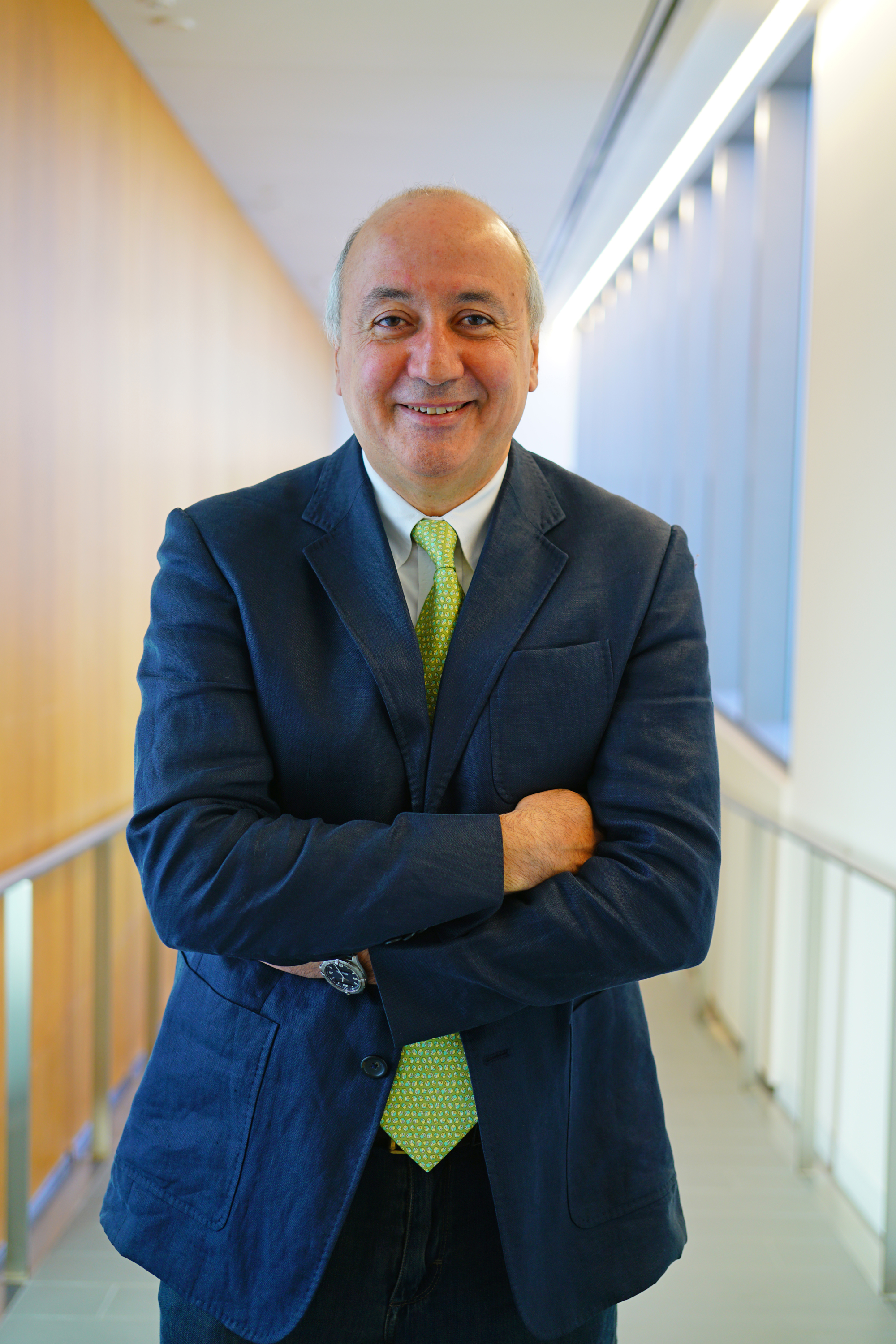
- Born: 1966 (age 59–60); Algeria

Academic background
- Education: École Polytechnique (BA); ENSAE ParisTech (MA); Massachusetts Institute of Technology (PhD)
- Doctoral advisor: Whitney K. Newey; Jerry A. Hausman

Academic work
- Discipline: Financial econometrics Mathematical statistics
- Institutions: University of Chicago Booth School of Business; Princeton University
- Website: Information at IDEAS / RePEc

Yacine Aït-Sahalia (born 1966 in Algeria) is the Otto Hack 1903 Professor of Finance and Economics at Princeton University. His primary areas of research are financial econometrics and mathematical statistics. He served as the inaugural director of the Bendheim Center for Finance at Princeton University from 1998 until 2014.

Prior to joining Princeton University, he was an assistant professor (1993–96), associate professor (1996–98) and professor of finance (1998) at the University of Chicago Booth School of Business.

He has served as editor of the Review of Financial Studies (2003–2006), co-managing editor of the Journal of Econometrics (2012-2018), and associate editor of the Annals of Statistics (2003–2006), Econometrica (2007–2013), the Journal of Finance (2007–2010), Finance and Stochastics (1996–2011), the Journal of Econometrics (1999–2012) and the Journal of Financial Econometrics (2001–2011). He served as director of the Western Finance Association (2003–2006).

He has been a research associate at the National Bureau of Economic Research since 1995.

== Education ==
Aït-Sahalia studied in classe préparatoire aux grandes écoles at Lycée Louis-le-Grand in Paris (1983–85), received his undergraduate degree from École Polytechnique in 1987, his master's degree from ENSAE ParisTech in 1989, and his Ph.D. in economics from the Massachusetts Institute of Technology in 1993.

== Research ==
Aït-Sahalia has made fundamental contributions to the estimation and testing of continuous-time models in financial economics.

Quite often in empirical finance, the model that is estimated or tested is written in discrete-time and represents only an approximation to the theoretical continuous-time model which motivated the empirical investigation. Aït-Sahalia has developed methods to remove this approximation. His first contributions include the development of nonparametric methods for estimating and testing these models, introducing the idea of comparing the densities predicted by the model to those estimated nonparametrically from the data at the same discrete frequency. These methods have been instrumental in uncovering nonlinearities in the dynamics of interest rates, volatility, and other variables.

The fact that large samples of data are often available, combined with the fact that the precise specification of the model has a large influence on the end result, make nonparametric methods particularly appealing in empirical finance. Aït-Sahalia developed methods with Andrew Lo to nonparametrically infer Arrow-Debreu state prices, or risk-neutral densities, from observable market data and studied the representative agent preferences embedded in the joint collection of time-series data on the underlying asset dynamics and the cross-sectional option data. In many settings, economic theory only restricts the direction of the relationship between variables, not the particular functional form of their relationship. Motivated by the estimation of the risk-neutral density, which starts from a monotonic and convex option pricing function, nonparametric estimators were constructed to satisfy these shape restrictions, as a modification of nonparametric locally polynomial estimators.

Aït-Sahalia developed series expansions based on Hermite polynomials to represent in closed-form the transition density of arbitrary continuous-time diffusion models. His series expansion, which represents the transition density as a power series in the time interval starting from a base density, makes it possible to accurately implement maximum-likelihood estimation of an arbitrary parametric continuous-time model using only discretely sampled data. This method has been shown to be the most accurate and fastest to represent the transition density of a diffusion model.

He has made numerous advances in the estimation and testing of models using high frequency data, with a particular focus on understanding the role and importance of jumps in joint work with Jean Jacod. His work has shown how distinguishing jumps from volatility is possible, how to analyze the finer structure or spectrum of asset returns including testing whether jumps are present and estimating their degree of activity, and how to implement principal component analysis in a high frequency setting. He also developed various methods to estimate volatility in situations where the high frequency data is noisy in joint work with Per Mykland and Lan Zhang.

Aït-Sahalia proposed models with Julio Cacho-Diaz and Roger Laeven based on a Hawkes process to represent asset returns and model contagion among them, along with estimation methods for these models based on discrete data. The optimization of portfolios when returns are subject to jumps, including possibly Hawkes jumps, was also studied in joint work with Tom Hurd.

Some recent work with Chenxu Li and Chen Xu Li include the development of implied stochastic volatility models which are stochastic volatility models designed to fit the implied volatility surface of options.

== Awards ==
Yacine Aït-Sahalia received fellowships from the Alfred P. Sloan Foundation (1998–1999) and the John Simon Guggenheim Memorial Foundation (2008–2009).

He was elected a Fellow of the Econometric Society in 2002, of the Institute of Mathematical Statistics in 2004, of the American Statistical Association in 2008, of the Society for Financial Econometrics in 2013, of the Institut Louis Bachelier in 2016, and of the International Association for Applied Econometrics in 2020. He is also a Fellow of the Journal of Econometrics (1998).

He has received awards for research excellence, including the Dennis J. Aigner Award (2003), the FAME Annual Research Prize (2001), the Cornerstone Research Award (1998), the Michael J. Brennan Award (1997) and the Review of Economic Studies Tour (1993).

He also received the University of Chicago’s Booth School Emory Williams Award for teaching excellence.
