= Irene Brambilla =

Argentine economist

Maria Irene Brambilla is an Argentine economist who works as a professor of economics at the National University of La Plata and as a researcher for the Argentine National Scientific and Technical Research Council (CONICET). Her research interests include international trade and microeconomics, and the effects of economic shifts on workers.

== Education and career ==
Brambilla received a licenciate (the equivalent of a bachelor's degree) in economics from the National University of La Plata in 1997. She continued her studies at Princeton University, jointly advised there by Gene Grossman, Elie Tamer, and Bo Honoré; she completed her Ph.D. in 2004.

She joined Yale University as an assistant professor in 2003, also working as a faculty research fellow for the National Bureau of Economic Research beginning in 2005. She returned to the National University of La Plata as a professor in 2008, and became an independent investigator for CONICET in 2012.

== Recognition ==
Brambilla was elected as a Fellow of the Econometric Society in 2022.
