= Josh Friedman (disambiguation) =

Josh Friedman may refer to:

- Josh Friedman, American screenwriter and producer
- Josh Alan Friedman, American musician and journalist
- Joshua Friedman, Pulitzer Prize winning American journalist
- Joshua S. Friedman, American businessman

== See also ==
- Josh Freeman (disambiguation)
