= Martin C. Schmalz =

German economist

- Born: 1984 or 1985 (age 41–42)
- Occupation: Economist
- Awards: Artur Fischer Preis

Academic background
- Education: University of Stuttgart and Princeton University

Academic work
- Discipline: Finance, Accounting, Management, and Economics
- Institutions: University of Oxford's Saïd Business School

Martin Schmalz is a German financial economist. He is a professor of Finance, Economics, and Real Estate at the University of Oxford's Saïd Business School.

== Education ==
Schmalz graduated with a Diplom-Ingenieur in Mechanical Engineering from the University of Stuttgart as the valedictorian, winning the Artur Fischer Preis. He received a scholarship from the Studienstiftung des Deutschen Volkes, Germany’s most prestigious scholarship foundation. He obtained his PhD in economics from Bendheim Center for Finance of Princeton University, and was granted a Fellowship of Woodrow Wilson Scholars while pursuing it.

== Career ==
Schmalz served as assistant professor of finance at the University of Michigan's Ross School of Business from 2012 to 2018. He then joined Oxford's Saïd Business School as associate professor of finance (with tenure) in 2019. He was elected Head of the Finance, Accounting, Management, and Economics Area in 2022.

In 2023, Schmalz was also named the Chief Economist and Director of the Office of Economic and Risk Analysis (OERA) of the Public Company Accounting Oversight Board (PCAOB). He succeeded Luigi Zingales in this role, who was the founding director of PCAOB's Center for Economic Analysis since 2013. He served there until May 2025.

Additionally, since 2023 he serves as a Director of Global Corporate Governance Colloquia (GCGC).

=== Teaching ===
Schmalz is the Academic Director of Oxford's Blockchain Strategy Programme and co-director of the AI in Fintech and Open Banking Programme. He co-authored the book The Business of Big Data: How to Create Lasting Value in the Age of AI. Poets and Quants named him one of the "40 under 40" best business school professors in the world in 2018.

=== Research ===
Schmalz is most well known for his research at the intersection of corporate governance, industrial organization, and antitrust economics.

His research covers law, finance, and economics, and focuses on the intersection of asset management, asset pricing, industrial organization, and corporate governance. He has been called to testify to The White House Council of Economic Advisers, FTC Hearings on Common ownership and competition, The U.S. Department of Justice, European Parliament, Australian Parliament, various central banks, and competition authorities worldwide.

==== Common Ownership and Competition ====
His 2018 Journal of Finance paper with José Azar and Isabel Tecu, "Anticompetitive Effects of Common Ownership" found evidence that common ownership by institutional investors was associated with higher airline prices, with estimated increases of 3-11% compared to separate ownership structures. Following his testimony at a 2018 Federal Trade Commission hearing on common ownership, the topic gained regulatory attention. The 2023 Federal Merger Guidelines included common ownership as an enforcement concern, stating that such arrangements "can reduce competition by softening firms' incentives to compete." In 2025, the Department of Justice and Federal Trade Commission filed their first formal statement in federal court on the antitrust implications of common shareholdings in the Texas v. BlackRock case, where eleven state attorneys general alleged that major asset managers used their shareholdings to coordinate coal output reductions. The paper launched a literature on "common ownership" of competitors and, as of 2023, was one of the most cited articles published in The Journal of Finance in the past five years, and has been called an "economic blockbuster" by Harvard Law School Professor Einer Elhauge.

He also co-authored the Journal of Political Economy article "Common Ownership, Competition, and Top Management Incentives" which proves that benign neglect by shareholders is a sufficient mechanism to explain the results in the empirical literature on "common ownership".

Despite his extensive research on common ownership and its competitive effects, Schmalz has stated in his FTC testimony that he has "always held back with policy proposals or endorsing them" on the topic, maintaining a research-focused rather than advocacy position.

Arte's documentary on BlackRock also covers the research on antitrust.

==== Audit Market Regulation ====
In his role as PCAOB Chief Economist, Schmalz has contributed to research on audit regulation reform. He co-authored a 2024 study examining how equity markets respond to audit inspection reports, finding that market-based transparency mechanisms could provide effective incentives for audit quality when issuers can be identified from inspection results.

Schmalz has also examined labor market dynamics in auditing, proposing that monopsony power in the audit labor market could explain apparent auditor shortages rather than solely supply-side factors. He argued that market concentration may enable audit firms to suppress wages below competitive levels, leading to reduced audit quality and perceived talent shortages.

==== Central Banking ====
In 2023, Schmalz co-authored research examining whether central banks exhibit profit-seeking behavior. The study, published in the Journal of Finance with Igor Goncharov and Vasso Ioannidou, found empirical evidence that central banks actively manage earnings to avoid reporting losses, particularly when political pressure is greater. The research found that the propensity to avoid losses was correlated with more lenient monetary policy and higher inflation. The authors stated that their findings inform debates about the political economy of central banking and the effectiveness of non-traditional central banking.

==== Other Research ====
The 2017 paper "Housing Collateral and Entrepreneurship", written together with David Sraer and David Thesmar, received the Brattle Group Distinguished Paper Prize.

As of May 2025, Schmalz is cited over 4600 times according to his Google Scholar page.

=== Fellowships and grants ===
In 2024, Schmalz was awarded with a €1.7 million HORIZON-ERC research grant by European Research Council.

In 2021, Schmalz received a $45 000 grant from the Washington Center for Equitable Growth for his project “Welfare Effects of Common Ownership.”

In 2020, Schmalz received a three-year research grant from the Norwegian Finance Initiative at Norges Bank Investment Management to analyse how changes in ownership, compensation structures, and communication from owners affect management behaviour.

In 2019, Schmalz was awarded a £40 000 Pemberton grant to support his research on the European private debt market. The same year, he received two awards from the Oxford Saïd Business School Faculty Research Fund: for his study “Horizon dependent risk aversion, preference reversals and demand for commitment,” and for his research on “Disagreement in Optimal Security Design.”

In 2016, Schmalz was appointed to the NBD Bancorp Assistant Professorship in Business Administration at the University of Michigan’s Ross School of Business. From 2014 to 2015, he was awarded the NTT Research Fellowship.

=== Academic visits ===
Schmalz was a visiting scholar at the Center for Economic Studies (CES) at LMU Munich in 2016, during which time he was affiliated with the University of Michigan.

== Podcast and media appearances ==
Schmalz has appeared as a guest on several economics and finance podcasts, discussing his research on common ownership, private markets, and the economics of data and artificial intelligence.

- In July 2026, he appeared on Markus' Academy, hosted by Markus Brunnermeier at the Princeton Bendheim Center for Finance, to discuss neglected risks in private markets.
- In November 2023, he was a guest on All Else Equal: Making Better Decisions, hosted by Jonathan Berk and Jules van Binsbergen and produced by the Stanford Graduate School of Business, discussing whether common ownership affects product market outcomes.
- In August 2023, he appeared on The Visible Hand to discuss common ownership, competition, and top management incentives.
- In December 2022, he appeared on Clearer Thinking with Spencer Greenberg to discuss common ownership and the effects of institutional investors on competition.
- In February 2020, he was a guest on Chris Williamson's podcast Modern Wisdom, discussing artificial intelligence, big data, and China.

Schmalz's research has also been the subject of podcast episodes on which he did not appear. In January 2018, the University of Chicago podcast Capitalisn't, hosted by Luigi Zingales and Kate Waldock, devoted an episode to the airline-pricing study by Schmalz and José Azar.

== Other activities ==
In addition to his academic career, Schmalz is also a licensed commercial pilot certified by the U.S. Department of Transportation Federal Aviation Administration (FAA). He holds a license to fly commercial planes and private helicopters, demonstrating proficiency in aviation operations and safety regulations.
