= Bradić =

Bradić may refer to:

- Bradić, Serbia, a village near Loznica
- Bradić (surname), a South Slavic surname found in Serbia
