= Mitchell R. Julis =

American businessman (born 1955)

- Education: B.A. Princeton University; J.D. Harvard Law School; M.B.A. Harvard Business School
- Occupation: Businessman
- Known for: Co-founder of Canyon Capital Advisors
- Parent(s): Thelma Rabinowitz Julis; Maurice Julis

Mitchell R. Julis (born April 14, 1955) is an American businessman and co-founding partner of Los Angeles hedge fund Canyon Capital Advisors.

== Early life and education ==
Born to a Jewish family, the son of Thelma (née Rabinowitz) and Maurice Julis. His parents were both immigrants: his father was of Greek-Jewish descent and worked as a social studies teacher and junior high school assistant principal; while his mother was of Polish-Jewish descent and worked as a speech therapist. When he was a youth, his family moved from New York City to Rockland County, New York. Mitchell attended the Woodrow Wilson School at Princeton University, graduating in 1977 with a bachelor of arts degree magna cum laude. He then earned a Juris Doctor degree, magna cum laude, from Harvard Law School and a Master of Business Administration with honors from Harvard Business School. During his years at Harvard, Julis became friends and roommates with Joshua S. Friedman, with whom he would later form Canyon.

== Early career ==
A summer internship with a bankruptcy firm in Los Angeles lessened Julis’ interest in practicing law. Dissatisfied with the experience, he began writing articles about the uses of bankruptcy in the entertainment industry. In 1982, Julis was reporting an article for Los Angeles Magazine about getting rich in a recession, which led him to interview Henry Wilf, an employee of bond trading firm Drexel Burnham Lambert. The conversation convinced Wilf that Julis would be better suited to investing than to journalism. In 1982, Julis took a job as a bankruptcy and creditors’ rights attorney at New York law firm Wachtell, Litpton, Rosen & Katz. Julis and Wilf stayed in touch and Wilf introduced Julis to Lowell Milken, the younger brother of Drexel chief Michael Milken. In November 1983, Julis joined Drexel Burnham Lambert.

== Founding Canyon ==
Julis and Friedman founded Canyon Capital Advisors in 1990, after Drexel Burnham Lambert was closed in 1990. Canyon is a multi-strategy hedge fund that invests in such asset classes as bank debt, high yield and distressed securities, securitized assets and equities. According to Forbes.com, Julis was the 28th highest earning hedge fund manager in 2014 earning $150 million. Canyon's flagship Value Realization fund scored a net return of 18.06% in 2014.

== Personal ==
Julis has served on the advisory council of Princeton's Department of Economics. In addition to the gift to establish the center, the Julis family also created the Julis Foundation Preceptorship at Princeton in 2007. The center is named in honor of his father and mother, Maurice Julis and Thelma Rabinowitz Julis who taught in New York during the 1970s. In 2015, Julis made a gift to Harvard Law School to establish the Julis-Rabinowitz Program in Jewish and Israeli Law. The inaugural director of the program is the Professor Noah Feldman.
