= Robert J. Vanderbei =

American computer scientist

Robert J. Vanderbei (born 1955) is an American mathematician and Emeritus Professor in the Department of Operations Research and Financial Engineering at Princeton University.

== Biography ==
Robert J. Vanderbei was born in Grand Rapids, MI, in 1955. He received his BS in Chemistry in 1976 and an MS in Operations Research and Statistics in 1978 from Rensselaer Polytechnic Institute and his PhD in Applied Mathematics from Cornell University in 1981. In his thesis, he developed probabilistic potential theory for random fields consisting of tensor products of Brownian motions. He was postdoctoral research fellow at New York University's Courant Institute of Mathematical Sciences and then at the Mathematics Department at the University of Illinois Urbana-Champaign. In 1984, he left academia and joined Bell Labs, where he served as a team member of AT&T's Advanced Decision Support Systems venture. In 1990, Vanderbei returned to academia to teach at Princeton University. He is currently a Professor in the Department of Operations Research and Financial Engineering (ORFE). In addition to his appointment in ORFE, he also has courtesy appointments in Mathematics, Astrophysics, Computer Science, and Applied Mathematics. He is also a member of the Bendheim Center for Finance.

== Research ==
=== Mathematical programming ===
Vanderbei’s arrival at Bell Labs coincided with Narendra Karmarkar’s discovery of a new polynomial-time algorithm for linear programming. In May 1985, he became the first nonmanagement team member of AT&T's Advanced Decision Support Systems venture, where he served as the interface to Karmarkar and as the lead developer of the first release of the linear programming software.

In 1985, Vanderbei, with Bell Labs colleagues Marc Meketon and Barry Freedman, wrote a paper proving convergence of a variant of Karmarkar's algorithm that became known as the Affine-Scaling algorithm. Eventually it became known that I.I. Dikin, working in Siberia and publishing in Russian, had proved convergence of the same algorithm under weaker nondegeneracy assumptions many years earlier. Vanderbei, both individually and with Meketon, and Freedman was awarded US Patents for his theoretical and practical work on the affine-scaling algorithm. Taken together with the three patents awarded to Karmarkar, this suite of patents represented the first awarded for what was considered pure mathematics. At the time, they generated loud objections from other researchers in optimization algorithms.

In 1987, Vanderbei left the development team and moved to the Bell Labs' Math Research Center in Murray Hill, NJ. In 1990, he returned to academia to teach at Princeton University. Throughout the 1990s Vanderbei's research governed the development of interior-point solvers. In 1993, Helmberg, Rendl, Vanderbei, and Wolkowicz developed an interior-point algorithm for semidefinite programming. Vanderbei later developed algorithms for quadratic problems, convex, and finally nonlinear optimization problems.

Vanderbei is the author of a textbook on linear programming and a software package for nonlinear programming called LOQO.

=== Purple America ===
Vanderbei received widespread attention for something that was only intended to be an exercise for the freshman computer programming course. U.S. News & World Report magazine, among other media outlets, reprinted his so-called Purple America map, which he made after the 2000 US Presidential election (and then subsequent national elections) to depict on a county-by-county level how the elections turned out.

=== Recent research interests ===
Since 2001, most of Vanderbei's research has been devoted to developing high-contrast imaging systems with the eventual aim of direct imaging of exoplanets. The concepts he has contributed to include shaped-pupil coronagraphs, PIAA-style pupil mapping coronagraphs, and space-based external occulters. Together with J. Richard Gott, Vanderbei is the author of a National Geographic book called Sizing Up The Universe (Book website).

== Other interests ==
Vanderbei also was a serious glider pilot for many years. From 1988 to 1999 he was chief flight instructor for the Central Jersey Soaring Club. In 1999, he retired from soaring and took up the hobby of astrophotography. He regularly posts new astroimages on his astro gallery website.

== Awards and honors ==
He was elected to the 2006 class of Fellows of the Institute for Operations Research and the Management Sciences. In 2012 he became a fellow of the Society for Industrial and Applied Mathematics for "contributions to technologies for exoplanet searches and to interior-point methods for nonlinear optimization". In 2014 he became a fellow of the American Mathematical Society, for "contributions to linear programming and nonlinear optimization problems". In 2017 he was award the Khachiyan Prize by the INFORMS Optimization Society.
