= African School of Economics =

Private university in Benin

African School of Economics (ASE)
- Type: Private
- Established: 2014 (12 years ago)
- President: Leonard Wantchekon
- Academic staff: 20
- Administrative staff: 40
- Location: Abomey-Calavi, Atlantique Department, Benin; 6°27′1.13″N 2°20′48.42″E
- Campus: Rural
- Degree programmes: Master in Business Administration (MBA), Master in Mathematics Economics and Statistics (MMES), Master in Public Administration (MPA), Master in Development Economics (MDE) and Ph.D. in Economics.
- Colours: White and blue
- Website: africanschoolofeconomics.com

The African School of Economics (ASE) is a private university headquartered in Abomey-Calavi (near Cotonou), Republic of Benin. In 2024 its West Africa Hub had campuses in Abidjan, Ivory Coast; and Abuja, Nigeria. The East and Southern Africa Hub features campuses in Zambia and Zanzibar, Tanzania. ASE offers several degrees in Undergraduate and Postgraduate programmes all across its campuses.

It is the expansion of the Institute for Empirical Research in Political Economy (IERPE, IREEP in French), founded in 2004, into a full-fledged pan-African university. Faculty members come from universities in Canada, Europe and the US.

== History ==
The school is a continuation of the success of the Institute of Empirical Research in Political Economy ( IERPE) founded by Leonard Wantchekon in 2004 in Cotonou, Benin. A nonprofit training and research initiative in Political Economy and Applied Statistics, IERPE provides expertise in public policy and trains executives for the public and private sectors in West Africa. The opening ceremony took place on 29 August 2014.

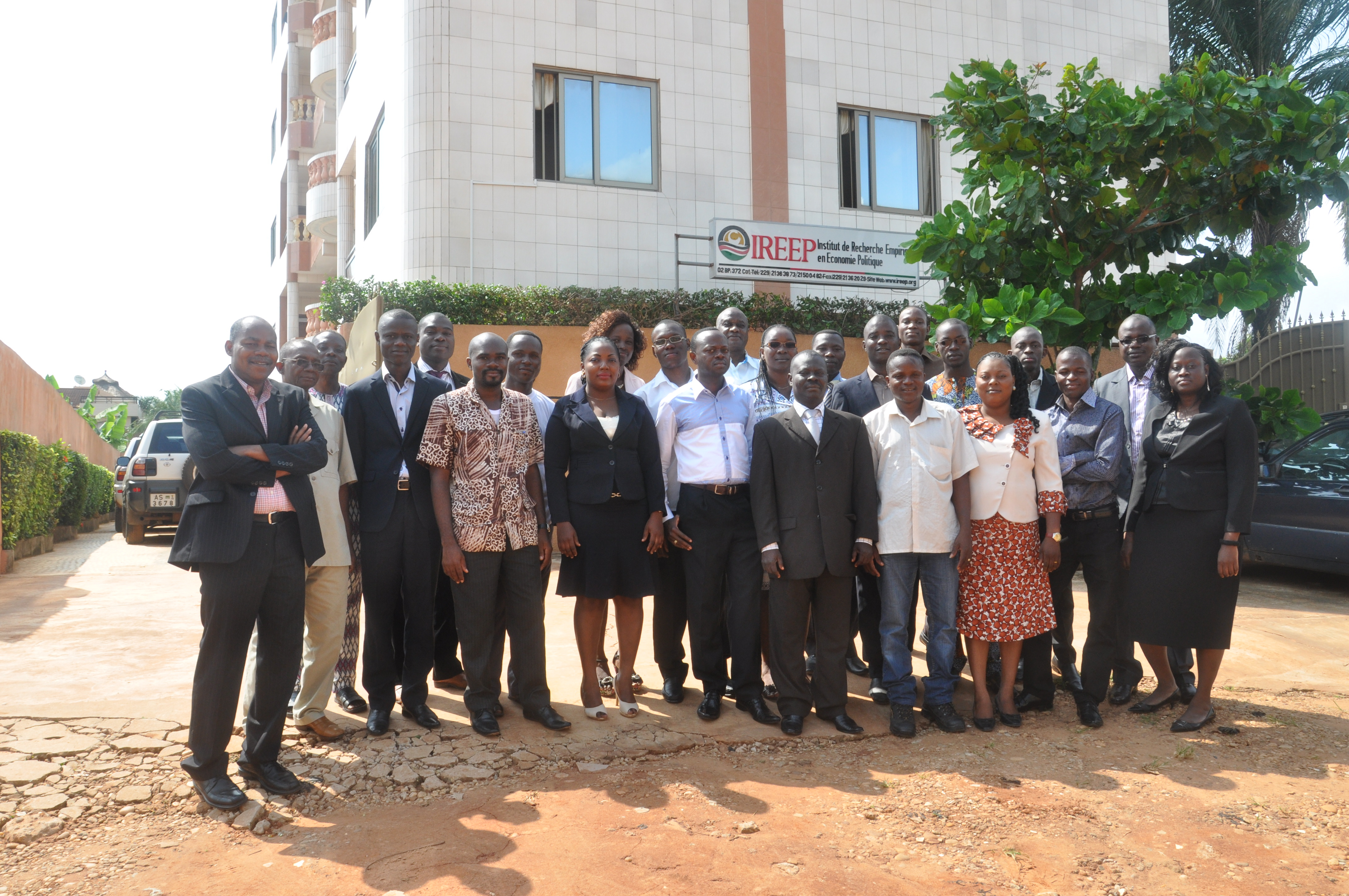
ASE and IERPE staff group picture (2014)

Since its inception, the institute has expanded its activities to include a successful Masters of Public Economics and Applied Statistics (MEPSA). The MEPSA has had 74 African graduates, all of whom are in high demand in the West African region: more than 75% of the graduates of the classes of 2006-2009 are employed in research centres throughout West Africa, in the World Bank and in different governments. The MEPSA program is accredited by the Ministry of Education in Benin.

ASE aims to meet the urgent need for an academic institution capable of generating the necessary human capital in Africa. Although the region has seen significant improvements in primary and secondary education in the past few decades there is still a pressing need for advanced education centers. Through its PhD programs, ASE hopes to provide the missing African voice in many Africa-related academic debates. Furthermore, through the Master in Business Administration (MBA), Master in Public Administration (MPA), Executive MBA and MPA (EMBA and EMPA), Master in Mathematics, Economics and Statistics (MMES), and Master in Development Studies (MDS) programs, ASE aims to provide the technical capacity that will enable more Africans to be hired into top management positions in development agencies and multinational corporations operating on the continent.

== ASE NIGERIA ==
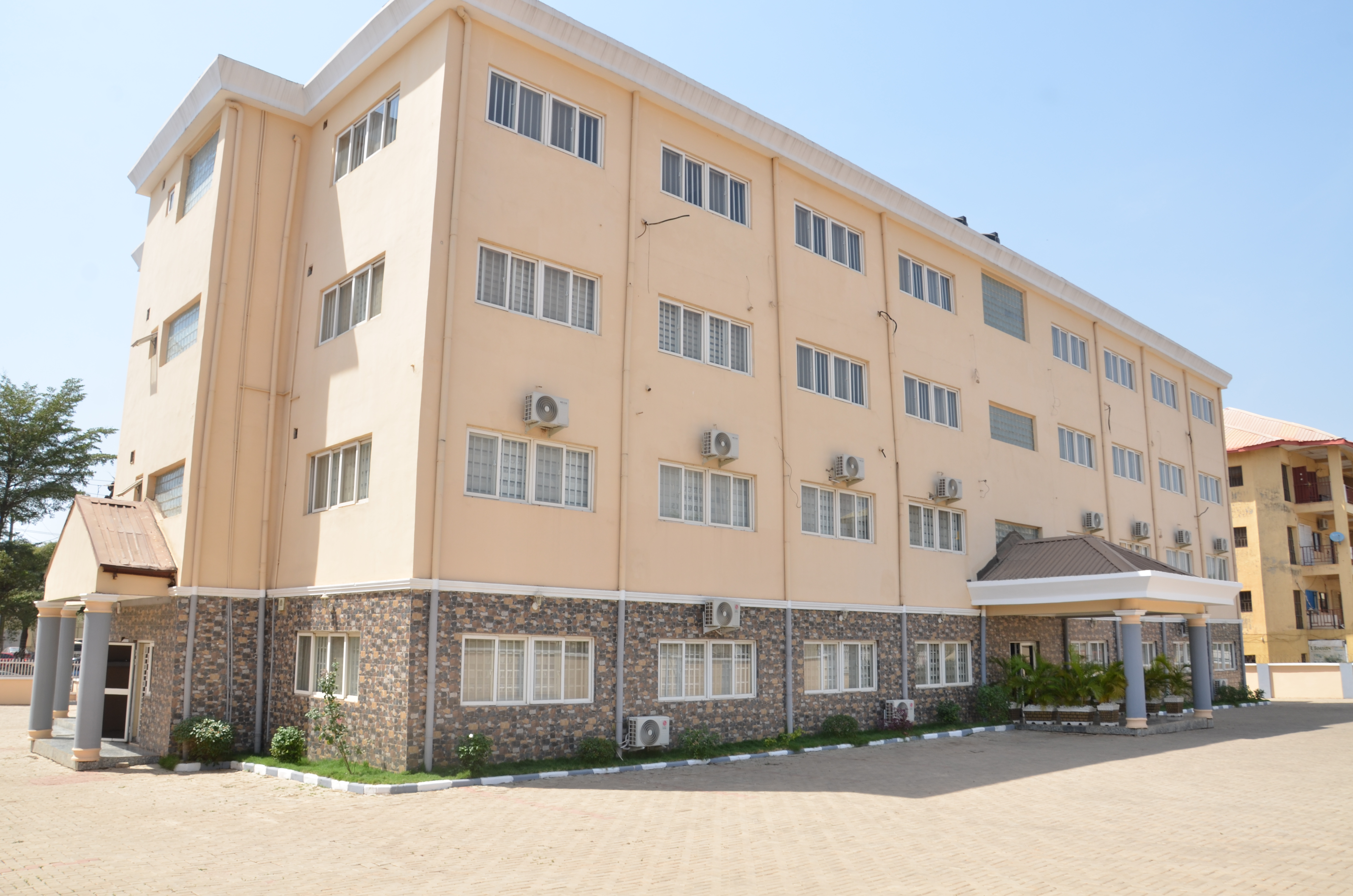
ASE Abuja Campus, Nigeria

ASE's branch in Nigeria was licensed on the 22nd of February 2024, by the National Universities Commission (NUC), to operate as a private university in Nigeria. Its maiden campus, the School of Arts and Sciences in Abuja, serves as the headquarters for ASE in Nigeria. ASE is set to expand with planned campuses in Kaduna State (School of Public Administration), Owerri, Imo State (School of Engineering); Port Harcourt, Rivers State (Environment and Energy Studies), and many others. Its pioneer cohort of 200 students from across the country, was a product of a joint scholarship effort between itself, AUDA-NEPAD, and the office of Nigeria's First Lady - Senator Oluremi Tinubu. It currently offers 20 undergraduate academic programmes across 14 departments in three faculties.

== Academic partnerships ==
1. American University in Cairo, Egypt
2. Barcelona Graduate School of Economics, Spain
3. BEM Dakar – Bordeaux Management School, Senegal
4. Center for Economic Research and Teaching (CIDE), (Centro de Investigación y Docencia Económicas), Mexico
5. HEC Montréal, Canada
6. Institut de Mathématiques et de Sciences Physiques (IMSP) at University of Abomey-Calavi (UAC), Benin
7. The Julis-Rabinowitz Center for Public Policy and Finance (JRCPPF), Princeton University, USA
8. Laval University, Canada
9. New Economic School, Russia
10. Princeton University, USA
11. Toulouse School of Economics, France
12. Universidad del Desarrollo, Chile
13. University of Namur - FUNDP Belgium
14. University of Ottawa, Canada

== See also ==
- Education in Benin
- List of universities in Benin
