= Markus Brunnermeier =

German economist

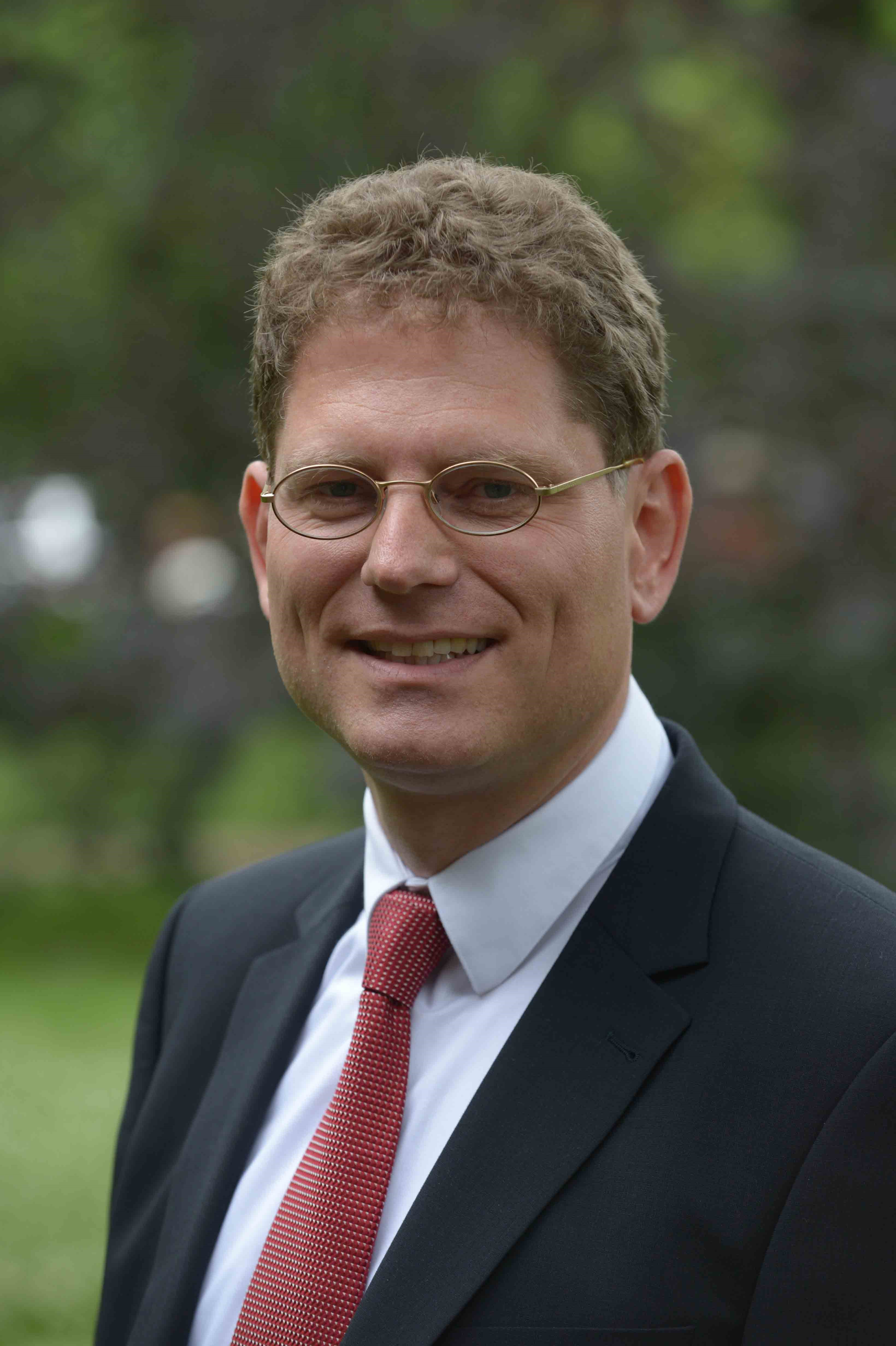
- Born: Markus Konrad Brunnermeier; 22 March 1969 (age 57); Landshut, West Germany (now Germany)

Academic background
- Education: University of Regensburg (BA); Vanderbilt University (MA); London School of Economics (PhD)
- Influences: Ben Bernanke

Academic work
- Discipline: Economics
- Institutions: Princeton University
- Awards: Smith Breeden Prize (2004); Sloan Fellowship (2005); Germán Bernácer Prize (2008); Guggenheim Fellowship (2010); Econometric Society Fellowship (2010)
- Website: Information at IDEAS / RePEc

Markus Konrad Brunnermeier (born March 22, 1969) is an economist, who is the Edwards S. Sanford Professor of Economics at Princeton University.

Brunnermeier is a faculty member of Princeton's department of economics and director of the Bendheim Center for Finance. He is also a nonresident senior fellow at the Peterson Institute for International Economics. Brunnermeier is also the president of the American Finance Association in 2023.

His research focuses on international financial markets and the macro economy with special emphasis on bubbles, liquidity, financial crises and monetary policy. He promoted the concepts of Resilience, liquidity spirals, CoVaR as co-risk measure, the paradox of prudence, financial dominance, ESBies, the Reversal Rate, Digital currency areas, the redistributive monetary policy, and the I Theory of Money.

He is or was a member of several advisory groups, including to the IMF, the Federal Reserve Bank of New York, the European Systemic Risk Board, the German Bundesbank and the U.S. Congressional Budget Office. He is a research associate at CEPR, NBER, and CESifo.

== Education and academic career ==
Growing up in Landshut, West Germany, Brunnermeier was expected to follow his father into the business of carpentry. A slump in the construction industry led Brunnermeier onto a different path. He worked for the German tax office in Landshut and Munich and served in the German Army before enrolling as an undergraduate student at the University of Regensburg in 1991. He continued his studies at Vanderbilt University, receiving a master's degree in economics in 1994. Subsequently, he joined the European Doctoral Program, first, at the Bonn Graduate School of Economics and, from 1995 to 1999, at the London School of Economics. He was awarded his Ph.D. by the London School of Economics (LSE) in 1999. His thesis was titled Investor behaviour, financial markets and the international economy.

While at the London School of Economics, Brunnermeier parleyed a survey paper into a book on asset prices, bubbles, herding and crashes. He was subsequently hired by Princeton University as an assistant professor in 1999. He became full professor in 2006 and assumed his current chaired professorship as Edwards S. Sanford Professor of Economics in 2008. In 2011, he set up the Julis-Rabinowitz Center for Public Policy and Finance at the Princeton School of Public and International Affairs. In 2014, he became director of Princeton's Bendheim Center for Finance. Brunnermeier earned an honorary doctorate degree in 2022 from the faculty of economics at the University of Regensburg.

== Selected awards, memberships, and editorial services ==
Brunnermeier received several career awards. In 1999, he was selected for the Review of Economic Studies Tour. He was named a Sloan Fellow in 2005, a Guggenheim Fellow and a Fellow of the Econometric Society in 2010. In 2008 he was awarded the Germán Bernácer Prize, which is granted to a European economists under 40. In 2016, the Bank for International Settlements (BIS) appointed him as the Lamfalussy Senior Research Fellow. He was elected as President of The American Finance Association in 2023, where he previously served as vice president in 2022.

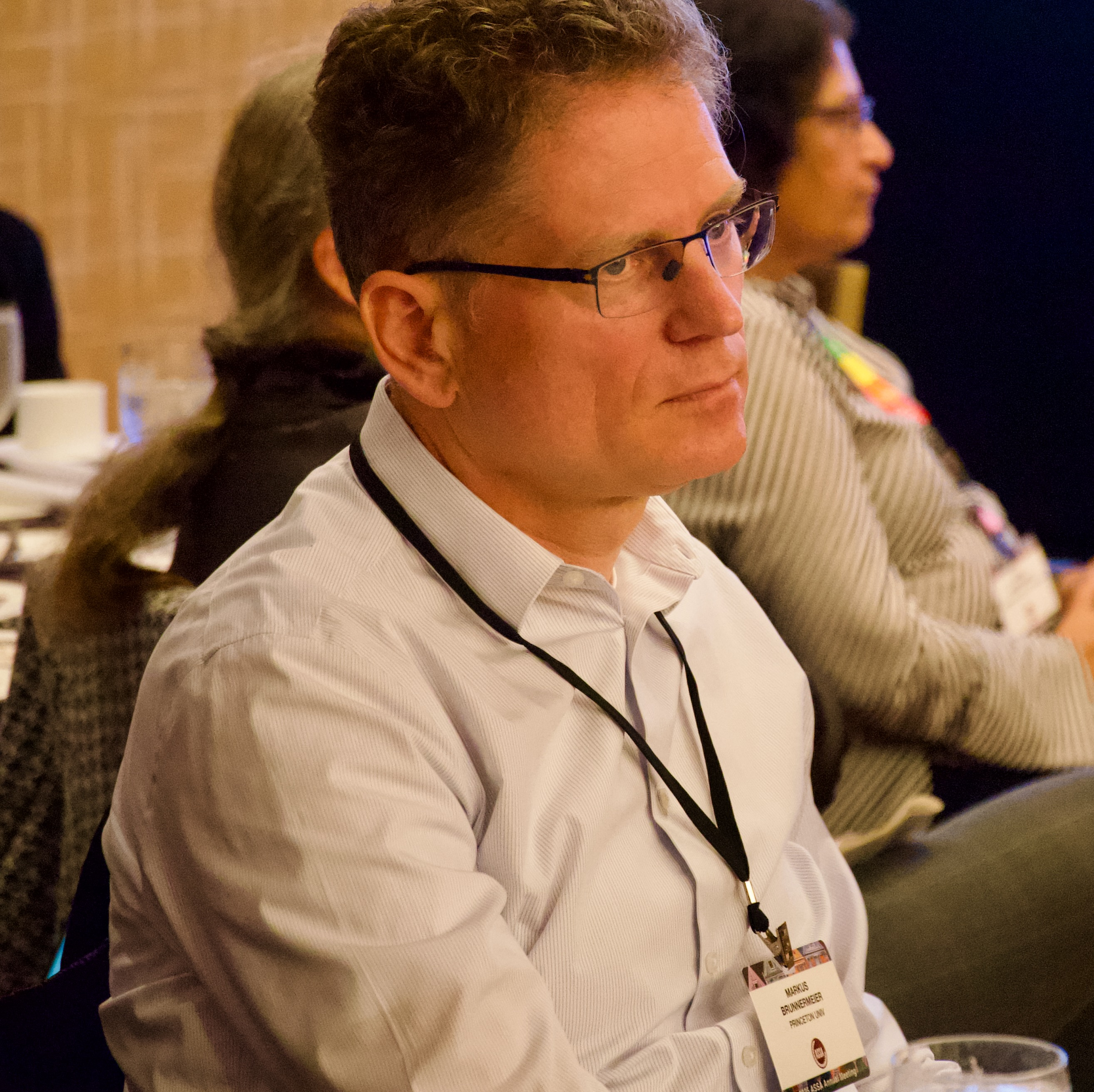
Brunnermeier at AEA 2025

Brunnermeier is also affiliated with the National Bureau of Economic Research, the Centre for Economic Policy Research in London, and directs the "Macro, Money and International Finance" area at the CESifo network. He is or was a member of several advisory groups, including to the IMF, the Federal Reserve Bank of New York, the European Systemic Risk Board, the German Bundesbank and the U.S. Congressional Budget Office.

Brunnermeier was an associate editor of several journals, including The American Economic Review, The Journal of Finance, The Review of Financial Studies, the Journal of the European Economic Association and the Journal of Financial Intermediation.

In March 2020, he established the webinar series "Markus' Academy" as a platform for leading thinkers to share their research with the public. The series' most popular lectures feature guests such as Economist Paul Krugman, former U.S. Secretary of the Treasury Lawrence Summers, Federal Reserve Chairman Jerome Powell, and former Chief Economist of the International Monetary Fund, Oliver Blanchard.

== Selected Research ==
Brunnermeier's research lies at the intersection of international macro, monetary and financial economics. He primarily studies distortions caused by financial frictions. These frictions invalidate the Efficient market hypothesis (EMH), a proposition that markets incorporate all information relevant to prices immediately and consequently the price of a given asset accurately represents the likely value of that asset. (Note: There are multiple forms of the EMH, each with various levels of confidence among academics economists. Among the strong, semi-strong, and weak versions of the hypothesis, the latter have higher levels of support. See Beechey, Gruen & Vickery (2000) for more detail.)

=== Price efficiency, bubbles, liquidity, and systemic risk ===
Faced with the empirical evidence that asset prices diverged from their fundamentals during the dot-com bubble, Brunnermeier crafted a model of trading where participants in the market would recognize bubbles in asset prices but continue to trade "into the wind". Brunnermeier's empirical paper, coauthored with Stefan Nagel, documents that hedge funds were riding the dot-com bubble. The paper won the Smith Breeden Prize in 2004.

Brunnermeier and Lasse Pedersen introduced different liquidity concepts and studied liquidity spirals, which are vicious cycles that amplify initial shocks and provide an explanation for the 2008 financial crisis.

Brunnermeier with Tobias Adrian from the Federal Reserve Bank of New York created one of the first systemic risk measures, the CoVaR, an alternative to value at risk which takes spillover and contagion effects between assets and industries into account.

=== Macroeconomy and finance ===
Brunnermeier and Yuliy Sannikov integrated financial frictions into macro and international economic models. Their macro models capture non-linearities that occur during crises episodes. They also introduced the concept of volatility paradox, which refers to the phenomenon that risk builds up primarily during tranquil times in background in the form of imbalances and only materializes when crises erupt.

=== Monetary theory and financial regulation ===
Brunnermeier and Sannikov's monetary paper, The I Theory of Money, studies debt deflation à la Fisher and the interaction between (redistributive) monetary policy and macroprudential policy. The "Paradox of Prudence" emerges: micro-prudent behavior of individual financial institutions is not necessarily macro-prudent. His approach provides an alternative to the predominant New-Keynesian view, in which price and wage rigidities are the primary frictions.

=== International financial markets ===
Brunnermeier's work on international finance documents the link between carry trades and currency crashes. He also analyzes sudden stops in international credit flows and other inefficiencies due to pecuniary externalities.

=== Economic philosophies and Euro ===
Further work of Brunnermeier focuses on the architecture of the euro and the Eurozone. His book, The Euro and the Battle of Ideas, (together with Harold James, from Princeton's Department of History, and Jean-Pierre Landau, from the Banque de France) shows how core problems of the euro are also linked to conflicting political and economic philosophies of the Eurozone's founding countries, especially those of Germany and France, and discusses ways to reconcile the competing views. Brunnermeier also proposes European Safe Bonds (ESBies) in form of Sovereign Bond Backed Securities (SBBS) as a means to break the vicious circle between sovereign risk and bank risk in the Eurozone and to rechannel flight-to-safety capital flows from cross-border flows to flows across tranches of the ESBies.

=== Resilience ===
In his book, The Resilient Society, Brunnermeier conceptualizes the notion of 'Resilience'. He argues that rather than simply avoiding risks (and therefore opportunities), the key is to distinguish between risk from which one can bounce back and risk that can trigger an adverse feedback loop. Across various policy areas, he describes how societies should be set up to increase societal resilience, which differs from individual resilience and resilience of a system. The Resilient Society was named 'One of the Best Business Books of 2021' by the Financial Times and won the 'Best German Business Book Prize' in 2021.
