= Ming-Yen Cheng =

Taiwanese statistician

Ming-Yen Cheng (Chinese: 鄭明燕) is a Taiwanese statistician specializing in nonparametric regression and semiparametric models for time series and longitudinal data, with applications including econometrics. She is a professor in the Department of Mathematics at Hong Kong Baptist University, where she directs the Statistics Research and Consultancy Centre and is associate director of the Institute for Computational and Theoretical Studies.

== Education and career ==
Cheng studied mathematics at National Tsing Hua University in Taiwan, graduating in 1988, and continued there for a master's degree in 1990. She earned a Ph.D. in 1994 at the University of North Carolina at Chapel Hill. Her dissertation, Curve Estimation with Boundary Considerations, was jointly supervised by James S. Marron and Jianqing Fan.

From 1994 to 1998, Cheng was an associate professor of mathematics at National Chung Cheng University in Taiwan, also including a visit in 1996 and 1997 to the Australian National University as a postdoctoral research associate. She moved to National Taiwan University in 1998, and was promoted to full professor in 2000, a position she held until 2018. From 2006 onward she was a distinguished professor at National Taiwan University.

Meanwhile, from 2008 to 2010, she was chair of statistics in the Department of Statistical Science at University College London. In 2017 she took her present position as a professor in the Department of Mathematics at Hong Kong Baptist University. She became associate director of the Institute for Computational and Theoretical Studies in 2022, and director of the Statistics Research and Consultancy Centre in 2023.

== Recognition ==
Cheng was a 2006 recipient of the TMS Young Mathematicians Prize of the Mathematical Society of the Republic of China.

She is a Fellow of the Institute of Mathematical Statistics, elected in 2007 "for her outstanding contributions to nonparametric and semiparametric statistics, and for her dedicated service to statistical profession". In 2009 she was elected as a Fellow of the American Statistical Association.

She has been named as an outstanding alumna of the National Tsing Hua University Mathematics Department.
