= Leonard Wantchekon =

Beninese economist

Leonard Wantchekon (born 1956) is a Beninese economist and professor of Politics and International Affairs at the Princeton School of Public and International Affairs, and an affiliate of the Economics Department at Princeton University. He taught at Yale University (1995–2001) and New York University (2001–2011). He is the founding director of the African School of Economics, which is based in Benin. His study with Nathan Nunn on the impact of slave trading on modern-day trust is among the most-cited studies in economics.

== Biography ==
Wantchekon was born and raised in Zagnanado, Benin. His parents were farmers. After enrolling at university, Wantchekon became an activist who campaigned against Mathieu Kérékou's dictatorship. Wantchekon evaded authorities until 1985 when he was arrested. After 18 months in prison, Wantchekon exaggerated his arthritis to get treatment outside of the prison; he used that opportunity to escape. He fled to Nigeria and the Ivory Coast before becoming a refugee in Canada.

He has an MA in economics from Laval University and the University of British Columbia (1992). He received his PhD in economics from Northwestern University (1995) where he was influenced by Roger Myerson. Wantchekon's research interests include democratization, clientelism and redistributive politics, resource curse, the long-term social impact of historical events, and development economics. His work has been featured in many top publications, such as American Economic Review and The Quarterly Journal of Economics.

He is a fellow of the American Academy of Arts and Sciences and the founder of the African School of Economics. From 2008 - 2009, he was the secretary of the American Political Science Association. Wantchekon is also a core partner in the Afrobarometer Network. In November 2018 he became the first black African to be pronounced Fellow of the Econometric Society.

He was a historical adviser on the 2022 American historical epic film The Woman King, directed by Gina Prince-Bythewood, which is about the Agojie, the all-female warrior unit that protected the West African kingdom of Dahomey during the seventeenth to nineteenth centuries. Wantchekon had a member of the Agojie in his extended family.
