= Josh Freeman (disambiguation) =

Josh or Joshua Freeman may refer to:

- Josh Freeman (born 1988), American former National Football League quarterback
- Josh Freeman (musician), guitarist for Immortal Disfigurement, former guitarist for A Wake in Providence
- Joshua B. Freeman (born 1949), American history professor
- Joshua Newton Freeman (1816–1912), Canadian politician

== See also ==
- Josh Friedman (disambiguation)
