= Chunming Zhang =

Chinese-American statistician

Chunming Zhang is a Chinese and American statistician whose research involves nonparametric statistics and semiparametric models with applications including neuroscience and statistical finance. She is a professor of statistics at the University of Wisconsin–Madison, and the chair of the Nonparametric Statistics Section of the American Statistical Association.

== Education and career ==
Zhang was an undergraduate at Nankai University, and earned a master's degree through the Chinese Academy of Sciences. She completed a Ph.D. at the University of North Carolina at Chapel Hill in 2000. Her dissertation, Topics in the Generalized Likelihood Ratio Test, was supervised by Jianqing Fan.

She joined the University of Wisconsin–Madison as an assistant professor in 2000, and has been a full professor since 2010.

== Recognition ==
Zhang was elected as a Fellow of the Institute of Mathematical Statistics in 2011, "for influential contributions to theory and methodology for high-dimensional data, for unifying common loss functions through Bregman divergence, and for fundamental work in nonparametric and semiparametric methodology together with applications in multiple testing, brain-imaging and finance".

She became a Fellow of the American Statistical Association in 2016. She is a 2024 Medallion Lecturer of the Institute of Mathematical Statistics.
