= Chris Williamson (TV personality) =

British broadcaster (born 1988)

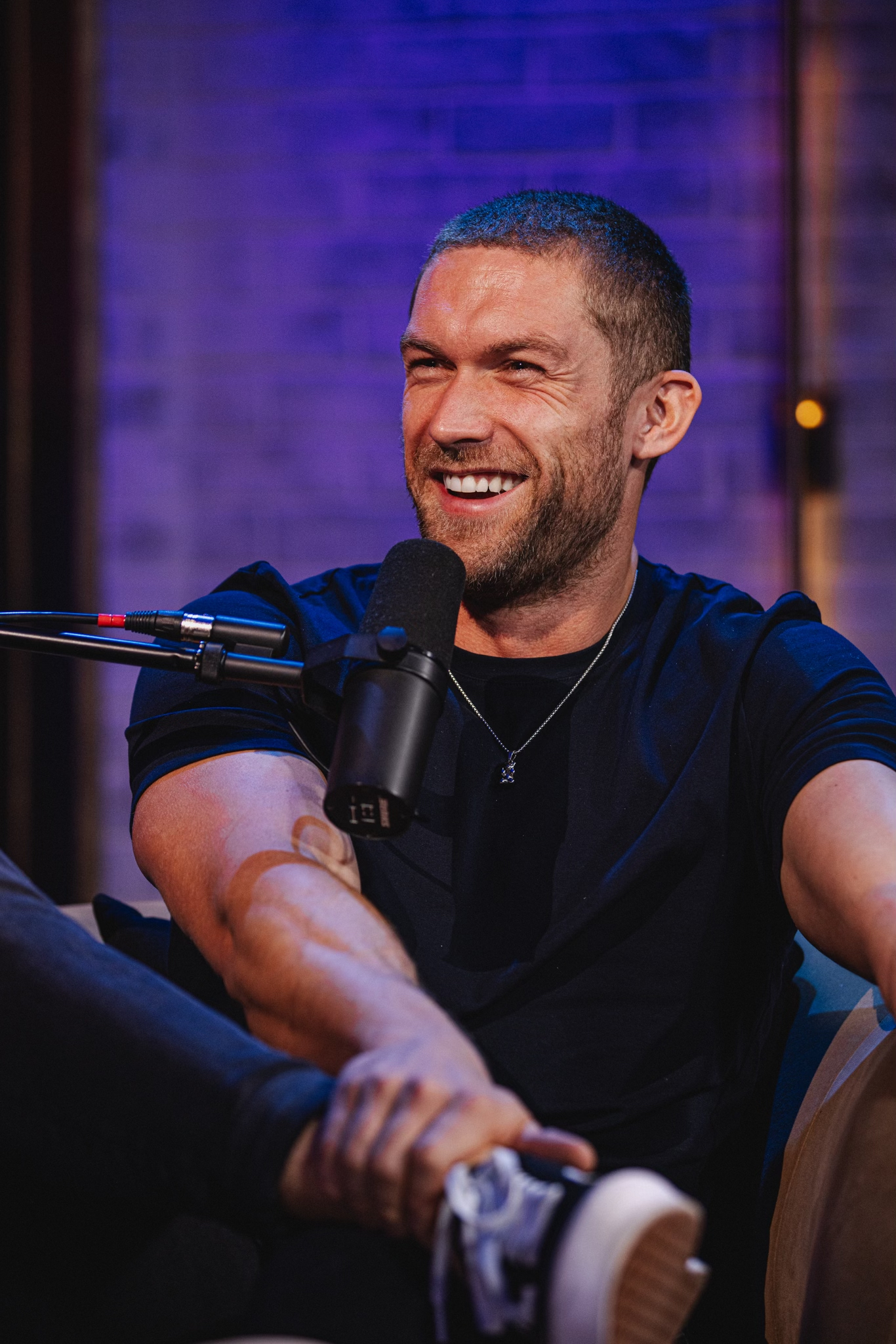
- Williamson in 2022
- Born: Christopher Williamson; 23 February 1988 (age 38); Stockton-on-Tees, England
- Education: Newcastle University
- Occupations: Podcaster; model; TV personality; YouTuber
- Years active: 2015–present
- Notable work: Modern Wisdom Podcast
- Website: chriswillx.com

Chris Williamson (born 23 February 1988) is an English podcaster, YouTuber and co-founder of Neutonic. He appeared on the first series of the reality show Love Island in 2015. Since 2018, he has hosted the Modern Wisdom podcast, a show which has been downloaded more than 1 billion times.

== Early life and education ==
Williamson was born in 1988 in Stockton-on-Tees in North East England. He played cricket as a child and played for the Durham Academy. He received a degree in Business Management and a masters in International Marketing at Newcastle University. Whilst studying he began a career in nightclub promotion.

== Career ==
Williamson was a contestant on the dating game show Take Me Out in 2012. He appeared on the first series of the reality show Love Island in 2015 as a model and nightclub promoter. Williamson has stated that he did not feel that he belonged on the show, and that his experiences on Love Island caused a period of introspection and personal development, and resulted in a desire to contribute to the world by creating "content that genuinely changes the way that people live their daily lives".

=== Modern Wisdom ===
In 2018, Williamson started his own podcast show, Modern Wisdom, with the subtitle "life lessons from the smartest people on the planet". He has discussed current events, politics, philosophy, science and hobbies with a variety of guests including Matt McCusker, Jordan Peterson, Jocko Willink, Naval Ravikant, Steven Pinker, Louise Perry, Will MacAskill, Robin Dunbar, Andrew Huberman, Alok Kanojia, Michael Malice, Sam Harris, Eric Weinstein, Douglas Murray, Konstantin Kisin, David Goggins, Destiny, Nick Bostrom, Martin Schmalz, Patrick Moore, and Alex O'Connor. Williamson has interviewed the authors of over 100 New York Times bestsellers.

As of December 2025, the show had over four million subscribers on YouTube and over a billion views.
