= Li-Shan Huang =

Taiwanese biostatistician

Li-Shan Huang (Chinese: 黃禮珊) is a Taiwanese biostatistician.

== Education and career ==
Huang earned a bachelor's degree in mathematics from National Central University, then attended the University of North Carolina at Chapel Hill for her master's and doctorate in statistics. Her dissertation, On Nonparametric Estimation and Goodness-of-Fit, was completed in 1995 under the direction of Jianqing Fan.

Huang began her teaching career at Florida State University as an assistant professor. She obtained postdoctoral research experience at Australian National University, and the University of Rochester. She remained at Rochester as an assistant and associate professor. Huang subsequently became a visiting professor at National Tsing Hua University, and returned to Taiwan to start a full professorship at NTHU in February 2011. Between August 2012 and July 2015, Huang led the NTHU Institute of Statistics.

Huang was elected a fellow of the American Statistical Association in 2021.
