= Bradić (surname) =

Bradić (Serbian Cyrillic: Брадић) is a surname found in Serbia and Croatia, derived from brada, lit. 'beard'. It may refer to:

- Biljana Bradić (born 1991), Serbian female football forward
- Jelena Bradic, Serbian-American statistician
- Nebojša Bradić (born 1956), Serbian theater director, and former Minister of Culture in the Government of Serbia
