= Jelena Bradic =

Serbian-American statistician

Jelena Bradic is a statistician from Serbia who works in the US as professor of statistics and data science at Cornell University. Her research interests include causal inference, high-dimensional statistics, and robust statistics.

== Education and career ==
Bradic has bachelor's and master's degrees in mathematics from the University of Belgrade. She completed her Ph.D. at the Princeton University in its Department of Operations Research and Financial Engineering; her 2011 dissertation, Sparse Estimation And Oracle Properties of Regularized Regression With Non-polynomial Dimensional Covariates, was supervised by Jianqing Fan.

She became an assistant professor of mathematics at the University of California, San Diego in 2011; she was promoted to associate professor in 2018 and full professor in 2022. At UCSD, she was also affiliated with the Halıcıoğlu Data Science Institute. In 2025 she moved to her present position at Cornell University.

== Recognition ==
In 2025, Bradic was named a Fellow of the Institute of Mathematical Statistics, "for innovative contributions in causal inference, robust machine learning methods, double robustness, for development of inferential methods that do not rely on sparsity in high-dimensional settings, and for exceptional service to the statistical community".
