= Gene Grossman =

American economist

Gene M. Grossman
- Born: December 11, 1955 (age 70); New York City, U.S.
- Spouse: Jean Baldwin Grossman

Academic background
- Education: MIT (Ph.D.); Yale University (B.A.)
- Doctoral advisor: Jagdish N. Bhagwati

Academic work
- Discipline: International trade Political economy Economic growth
- Institutions: Princeton University
- Doctoral students: Irene Brambilla
- Awards: Onassis Prize, Harry G. Johnson Prize, Bernard-Harms Prize
- Website: Information at IDEAS / RePEc

Gene Michael Grossman (born December 11, 1955) is an American economist specializing in international trade, political economy, and economic growth. He is the Jacob Viner Professor of International Economics in the Department of Economics and the Princeton School of Public and International Affairs at Princeton University. Grossman is known for his contributions to the theory of international trade, endogenous economic growth, globalization, offshoring, trade policy, and the political economy of protectionism. His research has helped shape modern understanding of the relationships among trade, innovation, economic growth, and public policy.

== Early life and education ==
Grossman was born in New York City on December 11, 1955. His father co-owned a small insurance agency and his mother, a holocaust survivor, was a clinical psychologist and professor at Queen’s College in City University of New York. Grossman attended the Bronx High School of Science and then Yale University, where he graduated summa cum laude with a Bachelor of Arts degree in economics in 1976. He subsequently earned a Ph.D. in economics from the Massachusetts Institute of Technology in 1980, where he studied under international trade economist.

== Career ==
Grossman joined Princeton University immediately after completing his doctorate in 1980 as an assistant professor of economics and international affairs. He was promoted to associate professor in 1985 and to full professor in 1988. In 1992, he was appointed Jacob Viner Professor of International Economics, a chaired professorship named after economist.

At Princeton, Grossman served as Director of the International Economics Section from 2000 to 2021 and completed two terms as Chair of the Department of Economics (2002–2005 and 2009–2014).

Throughout his career, Grossman has held visiting appointments at numerous institutions, including Tel Aviv University, Stockholm University, the London School of Economics, Sciences Po, Kyoto University, the University of California, Berkeley, Bocconi University, the Hebrew University of Jerusalem, and the Centre de Recerca en Economia Internacional (CREI) in Barcelona.

He has been a Research Associate of the National Bureau of Economic Research since 1981 and a Research Fellow of the Center for Economic Policy Research, London since 1984.

== Research ==
Grossman's research spans international trade, economic growth, political economy, multinational firms, intellectual property, globalization, environmental economics, and supply-chain resilience. He is particularly noted for developing influential theoretical frameworks explaining how innovation and technological change affect comparative advantage and long-run economic growth.

Much of his most influential work has been conducted in collaboration with Elhanan Helpman. Together they developed models of endogenous growth and international trade that integrated technological innovation into growth theory. Their book Innovation and Growth in the Global Economy (1991) became a foundational work in modern trade and growth economics.

Grossman and Helpman also made seminal contributions to the political economy of trade policy. Their article "Protection for Sale" (1994) and subsequent books Special Interest Politics (2001) and Interest Groups and Trade Policy (2002) established influential frameworks for analyzing the interaction between political lobbying and government trade policy.

Another important area of Grossman's work concerns globalization and production fragmentation. His research on outsourcing and offshoring, including collaborative work with Helpman, helped explain the international organization of production and the rise of global value chains.

Grossman also co-authored influential studies with Alan Krueger on trade and the environment. Their work on the environmental impacts of the North American Free Trade Agreement and on the relationship between economic growth and environmental quality contributed to the development of the environmental Kuznets curve literature.

In recent years, his research has examined the economics of global supply chains, trade agreements, automation, artificial intelligence, and economic resilience in the face of geopolitical and supply disruptions.

== Honors and recognition ==
Grossman was elected a Fellow of the Econometric Society in 1992 and a Fellow of the American Academy of Arts and Sciences in 1997.

His honors include the Harry G. Johnson Prize, the Bernhard Harms Prize of the Kiel Institute for the World Economy, and the prestigious Onassis Prize for International Trade, awarded in recognition of his contributions to international economics.

Grossman has received honorary doctorates from the University of St. Gallen (2009) and the University of Minho (2016).

== Selected works ==
=== Books ===
- Grossman, Gene M.; Helpman, Elhanan (1993-01-29). Innovation and Growth in the Global Economy. MIT Press. ISBN 978-0-262-57097-8.
- Grossman, Gene M.; Helpman, Elhanan (2001). Special Interest Politics. MIT Press. ISBN 978-0-262-57167-8.
- Grossman, Gene M.; Helpman, Elhanan (2002). Interest Groups and Trade Policy. Princeton University Press. ISBN 978-0-691-09597-4.

=== Selected articles ===
- Eaton, Jonathan; Grossman, Gene M. (1986). "Optimal Trade and Industrial Policy under Oligopoly". The Quarterly Journal of Economics. 101 (2): 383–406. doi:10.2307/1891121. ISSN 0033-5533.
- Grossman, Gene M.; Helpman, Elhanan (1991). "Quality Ladders in the Theory of Growth". The Review of Economic Studies. 58 (1): 43–61. doi:10.2307/2298044. ISSN 0034-6527.
- Grossman, Gene M.; Helpman, Elhanan (1994). "Protection for Sale". The American Economic Review. 84 (4): 833–850. ISSN 0002-8282.
- Grossman, Gene M.; Krueger, Alan B. (1995). "Economic Growth and the Environment". The Quarterly Journal of Economics. 110 (2): 353–377. doi:10.2307/2118443. ISSN 0033-5533.
- Grossman, Gene M.; Helpman, Elhanan (1995). "Trade Wars and Trade Talks". Journal of Political Economy. 103 (4): 675–708. ISSN 0022-3808.
- Grossman, Gene M.; Helpman, Elhanan (2002). "Integration versus Outsourcing in Industry Equilibrium". The Quarterly Journal of Economics. 117 (1): 85–120. ISSN 0033-5533.
- Grossman, Gene M.; Helpman, Elhanan (2005). "Outsourcing in a Global Economy". The Review of Economic Studies. 72 (1): 135–159. ISSN 0034-6527.
- Grossman, Gene M.; Rossi-Hansberg, Esteban (2008). "Trading Tasks: A Simple Theory of Offshoring". American Economic Review. 98 (5): 1978–1997. doi:10.1257/aer.98.5.1978. ISSN 0002-8282.
- Grossman, Gene M; Helpman, Elhanan (2021-05-01). "Identity Politics and Trade Policy". The Review of Economic Studies. 88 (3): 1101–1126. doi:10.1093/restud/rdaa031. ISSN 0034-6527.
- Grossman, Gene M.; McCalman, Phillip; Staiger, Robert W. (2021). "The "New" Economics of Trade Agreements: From Trade Liberalization to Regulatory Convergence?". Econometrica. 89 (1): 215–249. doi:10.3982/ecta17536. ISSN 0012-9682.
- Grossman, Gene M.; Helpman, Elhanan; Lhuillier, Hugo (2023). "Supply Chain Resilience: Should Policy Promote International Diversification or Reshoring?". Journal of Political Economy. 131 (12): 3462–3496. doi:10.1086/725173.

== Personal life ==
Grossman is married to Jean Baldwin Grossman, a researcher and faculty member affiliated with Princeton University's School of Public and International Affairs and a Senior Fellow at MDRC. They have two daughters, Sharon (Shari) Kennedy, an MD-PhD from Harvard Medical School and the Department of Computational and Systems Biology at MIT who is now a Fellow in Cardiology at UCSF and Dina Grossman, an MBA from the MIT-Sloan School who is now Director of Product at Counterpart Health .
