= Amir Sufi =

American economist (born 1977)

Personal details
- Born: January 15, 1977 (age 48); Topeka, Kansas, U.S.
- Education: Georgetown University (BA); Massachusetts Institute of Technology (MA, PhD)
- Awards: Fischer Black Prize (2017)

Amir Sufi is the Bruce Lindsay Professor of Economics and Public Policy at the University of Chicago Booth School of Business. He was awarded the 2017 Fischer Black Prize by the American Finance Association, given biennially to a financial economics scholar under the age of 40 for significant original research that is relevant to finance practice. He was awarded for his work on household debt and the financial crisis.

== Early life and education ==
Amir was born to immigrants from Pakistan in Topeka, Kansas. He attended Washburn Rural High School in Topeka. He has an undergraduate degree from Georgetown University, and a Ph.D. in economics from the Massachusetts Institute of Technology.

== House of Debt ==
Amir Sufi co-authored a critically acclaimed book House of Debt with Atif Rehman Mian.

== Personal life ==
Amir is married to Saima Abedin Sufi and has three children.
