= Canyon Capital Advisors =

American owned hedge fund

Canyon Partners, LLC
- Company type: Private
- Industry: Investment Management
- Founded: 1990; 36 years ago
- Founder: Joshua Friedman; Mitchell Julis
- Headquarters: Dallas, Texas, U.S.
- Area served: Worldwide
- AUM: US$ 29 billion (as of December 1, 2025)
- Website: canyonpartners.com

Canyon Partners, LLC is an alternative asset management company founded by Joshua S. Friedman and Mitchell R. Julis in 1990 headquartered in Dallas, Texas.

The firm focuses on credit-oriented investments, including corporate credit, asset-backed credit, and real estate. It has offices in Dallas, Hong Kong, London, Los Angeles, New York, and Tokyo.
