= Motohiro Yogo =

American economist

- Born: 1978 (age 47–48)
- Title: Hughes-Rogers Professor of Economics
- Awards: Fellow of the Econometric Society (2023)

Academic background
- Education: Harvard University (Ph.D.); Princeton University (A.B.)
- Doctoral advisor: John Y. Campbell
- Other advisor: James H. Stock

Academic work
- Discipline: Economics
- Sub-discipline: Financial economics; Econometrics
- Institutions: Princeton University
- Notable works: Financial Economics of Insurance (2023)
- Notable ideas: Demand system asset pricing; Test for weak instruments
- Website: https://sites.google.com/site/motohiroyogo/

Motohiro Yogo (與語基裕, Yogo Motohiro) is a Japanese American economist and the Hughes-Rogers Professor of Economics at Princeton University. He is a financial economist with research interests in asset pricing, insurance, international finance, and household finance. He teaches undergraduate financial investments and graduate asset pricing at Princeton.

== Education ==
Yogo earned an A.B. in economics from Princeton University in 2000 and a Ph.D. in economics from Harvard University in 2004.

== Career ==
Yogo was an assistant professor of finance at the Wharton School of the University of Pennsylvania from 2004 to 2010 and a monetary advisor in the research department of the Federal Reserve Bank of Minneapolis from 2010 to 2015. He was appointed a professor of economics at Princeton University in 2015. He is a faculty affiliate of the Bendheim Center for Finance, the International Economics Section, the Julis-Rabinowitz Center for Public Policy and Finance, and the Program for Research on Inequality.

Yogo is a research associate of the National Bureau of Economic Research and a co-director of its Insurance Working Group since 2016. He is an associate editor of Econometrica since 2024 and Journal of Finance since 2022. He was previously an associate editor of Journal of Risk and Insurance from 2019 to 2024, Review of Economics and Statistics from 2012 to 2014, and Review of Financial Studies from 2016 to 2019.

== Research ==
=== Demand system asset pricing ===
In "A Demand System Approach to Asset Pricing", Koijen and Yogo developed a new framework for analyzing financial markets using portfolio holdings data. In their application to the U.S. stock market, they find that demand elasticities for individual stocks are low, and shifts in asset demand across heterogeneous investors are central to explaining stock market volatility and predictability. This approach has a number of practical applications in asset management, investment banking, risk assessment, and central banking. For example, an asset demand system could be used to measure the price impact of trades and to discover new sources of alpha. In central banking, an asset demand system could be used to predict the impact of interest-rate and quantitative-easing policies on asset prices and exchange rates.

=== Insurance ===
In a series of papers, Koijen and Yogo developed a unified framework to study the impact of financial frictions, regulation, and market power on all decisions of insurers including insurance pricing, contract design, reinsurance, portfolio choice, and risk management. Their work is summarized in a graduate-level textbook titled Financial Economics of Insurance.

=== Weak instruments ===
Weak instruments lead to biased estimators and size distortions in hypothesis tests in instrumental variables regression. In "Testing for Weak Instruments in Linear IV Regression", Stock and Yogo developed a pretest to reject the null of weak instruments, based on the first-stage F-statistic. The critical values depend on the estimator (two-stage least squares, limited information maximum likelihood, or k-class estimator), the number of endogenous regressors, and the number of instruments. After rejecting the pretest, a researcher can proceed with standard inference for the corresponding estimator.

== Books ==
- Koijen, Ralph S.J.; Yogo, Motohiro (2023). Financial Economics of Insurance. Princeton, NJ: Princeton University Press. ISBN 978-0691250038.

== Selected publications ==
- Koijen, Ralph S.J.; Yogo, Motohiro (2026). "Exchange Rates and Asset Prices in a Global Demand System". Journal of Political Economy, forthcoming.
- Koijen, Ralph S.J.; Richmond, Robert J.; Yogo, Motohiro (2024). "Which Investors Matter for Equity Valuations and Expected Returns?". Review of Economic Studies. 91 (4): 2387–2424. doi:10.1093/restud/rdae043.
- Koijen, Ralph S.J.; Yogo, Motohiro (2023). "Understanding the Ownership Structure of Corporate Bonds". American Economic Review: Insights. 5 (1): 73–92. doi:10.1257/aeri.20220320.
- Koijen, Ralph S.J.; Yogo, Motohiro (2022). "The Fragility of Market Risk Insurance". Journal of Finance. 77 (2): 815–862. doi:10.1111/jofi.13118.
- Koijen, Ralph S.J.; Koulischer, François; Nguyen, Benoît; Yogo, Motohiro (2021). "Inspecting the Mechanism of Quantitative Easing in the Euro Area". Journal of Financial Economics. 140 (1): 1–20. doi:10.1016/j.jfineco.2021.01.002.
- Koijen, Ralph S.J.; Yogo, Motohiro (2019). "A Demand System Approach to Asset Pricing". Journal of Political Economy. 127 (4): 1475–1515. doi:10.1086/701683.
- Koijen, Ralph S.J.; Yogo, Motohiro (2016). "Shadow Insurance". Econometrica. 84 (3): 1265–1287. doi:10.3982/ecta12401.
- Koijen, Ralph S.J.; Yogo, Motohiro (2015). "The Cost of Financial Frictions for Life Insurers". American Economic Review. 105 (1): 445–475. doi:10.1257/aer.20121036.
- Gomes, João F.; Kogan, Leonid; Yogo, Motohiro (2009). "Durability of Output and Expected Stock Returns". Journal of Political Economy. 117 (5): 941–986. doi:10.1086/648882.
- Campbell, John Y.; Yogo, Motohiro (2006). "Efficient Tests of Stock Return Predictability". Journal of Financial Economics. 81 (1): 27–60. doi:10.1016/j.jfineco.2005.05.008.
- Stock, James H.; Yogo, Motohiro (2005). "Testing for Weak Instruments in Linear IV Regression". In Andrews, Donald W.K.; Stock, James H. (eds.). Identification and Inference for Econometric Models: Essays in Honor of Thomas Rothenberg. Cambridge: Cambridge University Press. pp. 80–108. doi:10.1017/CBO9780511614491.006.

== Awards ==
- Fellow of the Econometric Society (2023)
- GPIF Finance Award (2019)
- Swiss Finance Institute Outstanding Paper Award (2014)
- Zellner Thesis Award in Business and Economic Statistics (2005)
