= House of Debt =

2014 book by Atif Mian

- First edition
- Author: Atif Mian, Amir Sufi
- Language: English
- Subject: 2008 financial crisis
- Publisher: University of Chicago Press
- Publication date: May 21, 2014
- Publication place: United States
- Media type: Print, e-book
- Pages: 192
- ISBN: 9780226081946
- OCLC: 898000145

House of Debt: How They (and You) caused the Great Recession, and How We Can Prevent It from Happening Again is a 2014 book by economists Atif Mian and Amir Sufi on the linkages between household debt in the United States and the 2008 financial crisis.
