= Harold James (historian) =

British economic historian

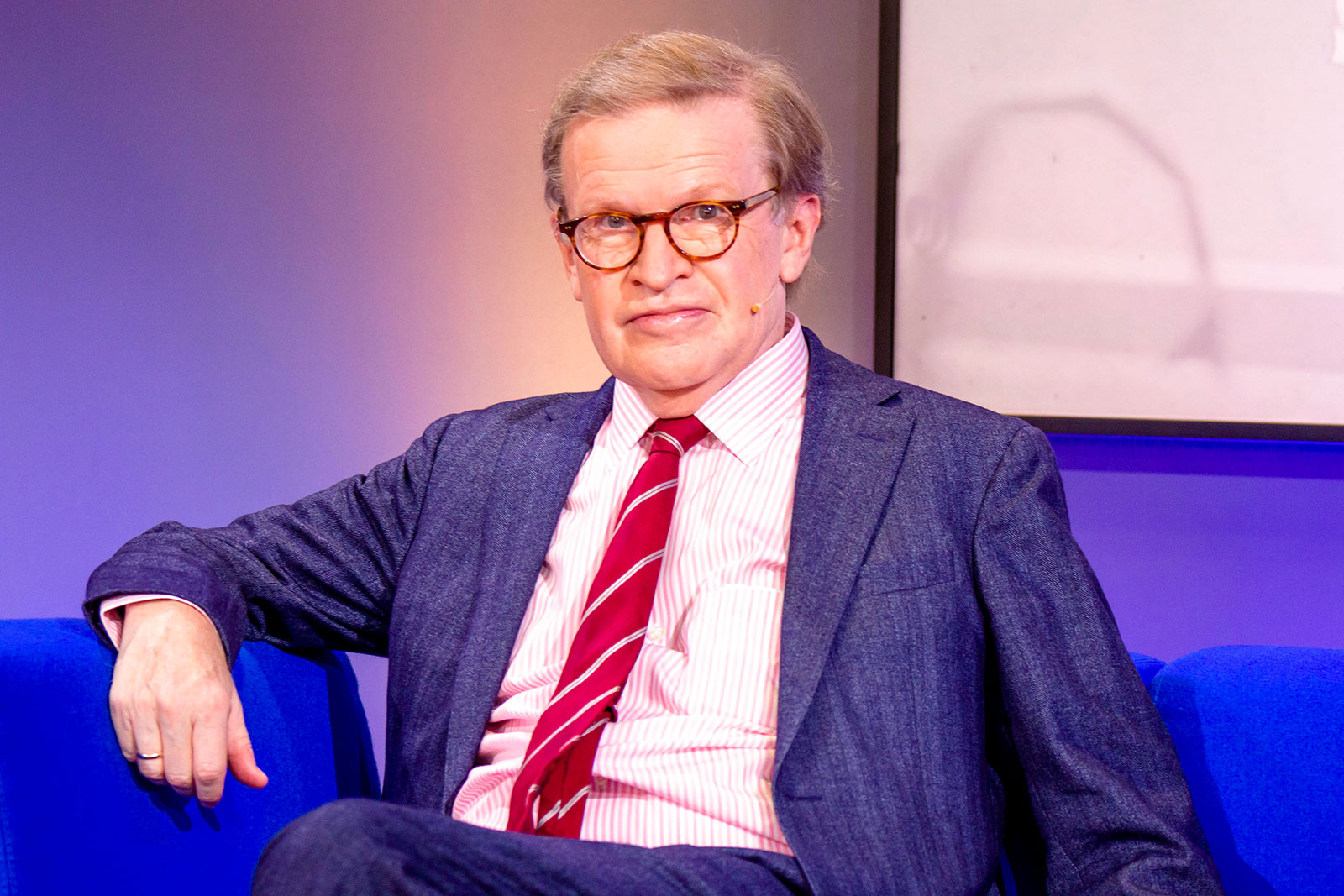

Harold James (born 19 January 1956 in Bedford, United Kingdom) is an economic historian specialising in the history of Germany and European economic history. He is a Professor of History at Princeton University as well as the university's Princeton School of Public and International Affairs. He currently writes monthly columns for Project Syndicate covering economic history. He is also a senior fellow at the Centre for International Governance Innovation.

== Background ==
Harold James was born and raised in the United Kingdom. He attended The Perse School in Cambridge. He completed his undergraduate education at Gonville and Caius College, Cambridge in 1978, and received his PhD at Peterhouse, Cambridge in 1982. At Cambridge University he received the Ellen MacArthur Prize for Economic History. From 1978 to 1986 he was a Fellow of Peterhouse, Cambridge. He began teaching at Princeton University in 1986. In 2004 the German Historical Institute in Washington, D.C., awarded him the Helmut Schmidt Prize in Economic History. In 2013 James received an Honorary Doctorate from the University of Lucerne. He serves on the editorial committee of the journal World Politics and is chairman of the Academic Council of eabh (European Association for Banking and Financial History).

James is married to Marzenna Kowalik (1964 – ), a political scientist who specialises in Polish-Soviet economic relations who also teaches at Princeton. They have three children.

== German history ==
In the earlier part of his career, James focused on modern German history, particularly German financial history in the interwar era. Among his major contributions to the field are a detailed study of Deutsche Bank, an examination of the role of the Reichsbank in seizing Jewish financial assets during the Nazi era, and a reappraisal of the peculiar nature of the German national identity. James' explanation of the evolution of the German identity places particular emphasis on an "economic identity", which provided the impetus for unification in the 19th century. In 1992 he was appointed to the Independent Commission of Experts, which had been set up by the Swiss Parliament to examine the refugee policy of Switzerland during World War II as well as economic and financial relationships between Switzerland and Nazi Germany.

== Globalization ==
Harold James has written extensively on the economic implications of globalisation, drawing comparisons with historical attempts at globalisation that ended with the Great Depression beginning in 1929. He argues that the Great Depression must not be considered as only an American phenomenon, but as a global economic crisis. He examines the contemporary issues associated with globalisation in the context of larger economic trends, which were disrupted by the World Wars and the Great Depression.

== Bibliography ==
- Reichsbank and public finance in Germany, 1924–1933. 1985.
- German Slump: Politics and Economics, 1924–1936 (1986) ISBN 0-19-821972-5
- A German Identity, 1770–1990 (1989) ISBN 0-297-79504-X
- Role of Banks in the Interwar Economy (Cambridge University Press, 1991) ISBN 0-521-39437-6
- Review article: "The Prehistory of the Federal Republic," The Journal of Modern History Vol. 63, No. 1, March 1991
- When the Wall Came Down (Routledge, 1992) ISBN 0-415-90589-3
- Zerrissene Zwischenkriegszeit (1994) ISBN 3-7890-3367-7
- International Monetary Cooperation Since Bretton Woods (Oxford University Press, 1996) ISBN 0-19-510113-8
- Monetary and Fiscal Unification in Nineteenth Century Germany (1997) ISBN 0-88165-109-5
- Third Reich: The Essential Readings (1999) ISBN 0-631-20700-7
- Requiem auf eine Währung: die Mark, 1873–2001 (Stuttgart, 2001) ISBN 3-421-05568-8
- The End of Globalization: Lessons from the Great Depression (Harvard University Press, 2001). ISBN 0-674-00474-4
- Verbandspolitik im Nationalsozialismus, von der Interessenvertretung zur Wirtschaftsgruppe (München, 2001) ISBN 3-492-04335-6
- The Deutsche Bank and the Nazi Economic War against the Jews: The Expropriation of Jewish-Owned Property. Cambridge: Cambridge University Press. 2001. ISBN 9781139428958.
- Enterprise in the Period of Fascism in Europe (ed.) (with Jakob Tanner) (Ashgate Publishing, 2002) ISBN 0-7546-0077-7
- Interwar Depression in an International Context (2002) ISBN 3-486-56610-5
- Europe Reborn: A History 1914–2000 (Pearson Longman, 2003) ISBN 0-582-21533-1
- International Financial History in the Twentieth Century (ed.) (with Marc Flandreau and Carl-Ludwig Holtfrerich) (Cambridge University Press, 2003) ISBN 0-521-81995-4
- Nazi Dictatorship and the Deutsche Bank (Cambridge University Press, 2004) ISBN 0-521-83874-6
- "The vulnerability of globalization : Helmut Schmidt Prize Lecture at the German Historical Institute May 20, 2004". Bulletin of the German Historical Institute. 35: 85–95. Fall 2004.
- Family Capitalism: Wendels, Haniels, Falcks, and the Continental European Model (Harvard University Press, 2006) ISBN 0-674-02181-9
- The Roman Predicament: How the Rules of International Order Create the Politics of Empire (Princeton University Press, 2006) ISBN 0-691-12221-0
- Making the European Monetary Union. (Harvard University Press, 2006) ISBN 0-674-06683-9
- The Creation and Destruction of Value: The Globalization Cycle (Harvard University Press, 2009) ISBN 0-674-03584-4
- Krupp: A History of the Legendary German Firm. (Princeton University Press, 2012) ISBN 9780691153407
- The Euro and the Battle of Ideas. (with Markus K. Brunnermeier and Jean-Pierre Landau)(Princeton University Press, 2016) ISBN 978-0691172927
- Financial Innovation, Regulation and Crises in History. (ed.) (with Piet Clement and Herman Van der Wee) (Routledge, 2016) ISBN 9781317317654
- Europe Contested: From the Kaiser to Brexit. (Taylor & Francis, 2019) ISBN 9781000692013
- Making a Modern Central Bank: The Bank of England 1979–2003. (Cambridge University Press, 2020) ISBN 9781108835015
- Harold James and Marzenna James: Ein Banker im Widerstand About Feliks Młynarski.
