= Journal of Financial Econometrics =

- Discipline: Economics
- Language: English

Publication details
- Publisher: Oxford University Press (United Kingdom)
- Impact factor: 3.225 (2020)

Standard abbreviations
- ISO 4: J. Financ. Econom.

Indexing
- ISSN: 1479-8409 (print); 1479-8417 (web)

Links
- Journal homepage

The Journal of Financial Econometrics is a peer reviewed academic journal of econometrics. It is published by Oxford University Press. Its editors are Allan Timmermann (UC San Diego) and Fabio Trojani (University of Geneva).

== Abstracting and indexing ==
The journal is abstracted and indexed by:

- Scopus
- EconLit
- Social Sciences Citation Index

According to the Journal Citation Reports, the journal has a 2020 impact factor of 3.225, ranking it 154/557 in the category "ECONOMICS".
