= Wei Xiong =

Chinese economist

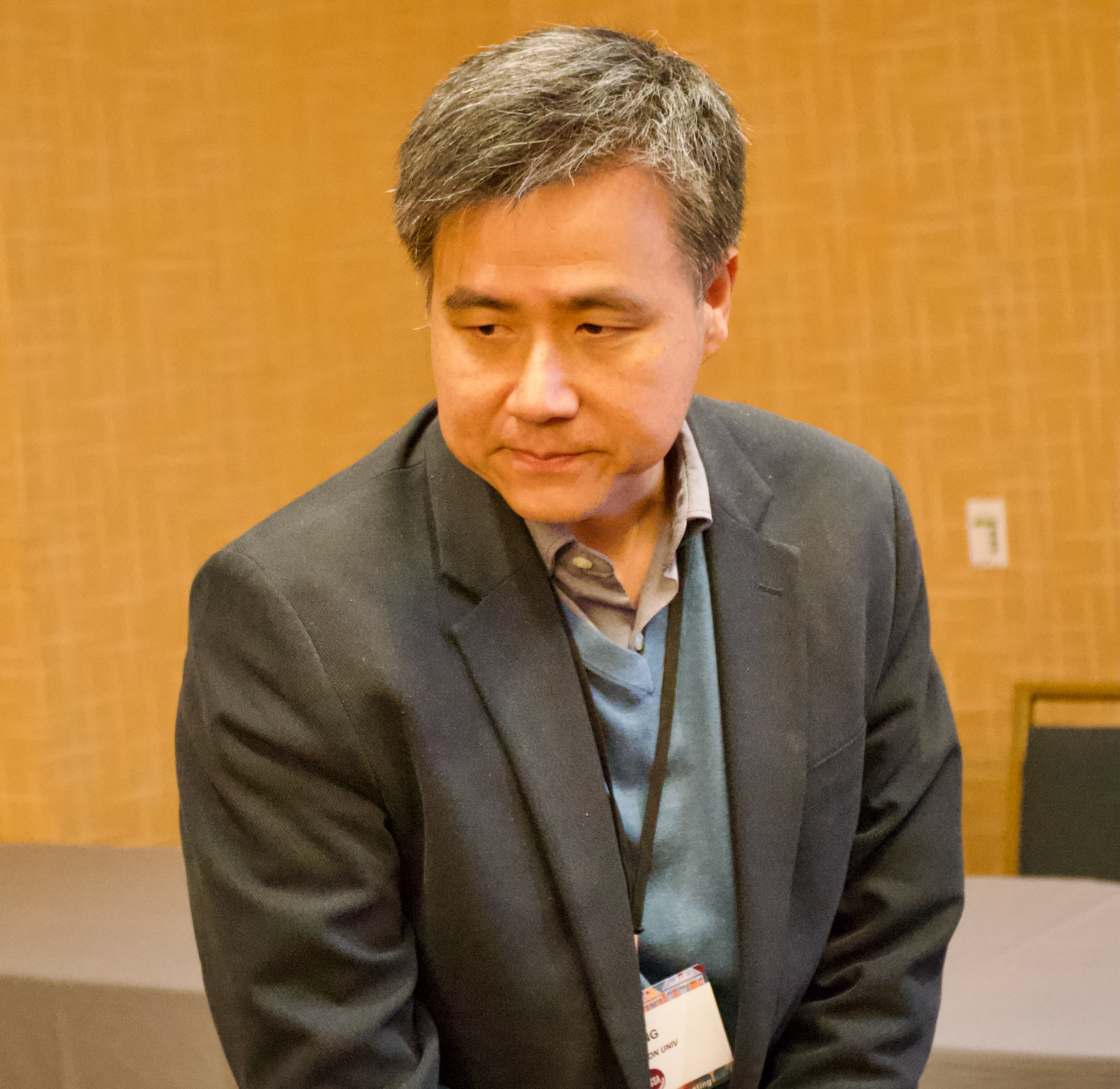
Xiong at 2025 AEA Conference

Wei Xiong (Chinese: 熊伟; pinyin: Xióng Weǐ, is a Chinese economist currently the John H. Scully '66 Professor in Finance and Professor of Economics at Princeton University. He also serves as the Academic Dean of School of Management and Economics, the Chinese University of Hong Kong, Shenzhen.

== Education ==
In 1993, Xiong received his B.S. in physics from the University of Science and Technology of China. He then received his M.A. in physics from Columbia University in 1995 and his Ph.D. in finance from Duke University in 2001.
