= Bo Honoré =

Danish economist

Bo Honoré is a Danish economist who is currently the Class of 1913 Professor of Political Economy at Princeton University.
