= Yuliy Sannikov =

Ukrainian economist (born 1978)

- Юлій Санніков
- Born: November 3, 1978 (age 47)
- Education: Princeton University (BA); Stanford University (PhD)
- Scientific career
- Fields: Mathematical economics Game theory
- Workplaces: Stanford University; Princeton University
- Doctoral advisor: Robert B. Wilson; Andrzej Skrzypacz

Yuliy Sannikov (born November 3, 1978) is a Ukrainian economist known for his contributions to mathematical economics, game theory, and corporate finance.

== Education ==
He received his A.B. in mathematics from Princeton in 2000, he then earned a Ph.D. in business administration from Stanford Graduate School of Business in 2004.

== Career ==
He is an economics professor at the Stanford Graduate School of Business, and won both the 2015 Fischer Black Prize and 2016 John Bates Clark Medal.

Sannikov is also one of the few participants to win three gold medals at the International Mathematical Olympiad.

== Publications ==
- with Markus K. Brunnermeier: The I Theory of Money. NBER Working Paper 22533, 2016, doi:10.3386/w22533.
- with Markus K. Brunnermeier: International Credit Flows and Pecuniary Externalities. In. American Economic Journal: Macroeconomics 7(1), January 2015, 297–338, doi:10.1257/mac.20140054.
- with Markus K. Brunnermeier: A Macroeconomic Model with a Financial Sector. The American Economic Review 104(2), February 2014, 379–421, doi:10.1257/aer.104.2.379.
- with Dilip Abreu: An Algorithm for Two-Player Repeated Games With Perfect Monitoring. Theoretical Economics 9, 2014, 313–338, doi:10.3982/TE1302.
- with Alex Edmans, Xavier Gabaix, Tomas Sadzik: Dynamic CEO Compensation. The Journal of Finance 67(5), October 2012, 1603–1647, doi:10.1111/j.1540-6261.2012.01768.x.
- with Eduardo Faingold: Reputation in Continuous-Time Games. Econometrica 79(3), May 2011, 773–876, doi:10.3982/ECTA7377.
- with Andrzej Skrzypacz: The Role of Information in Repeated Games with Frequent Actions. Econometrica 78(3), May 2010, 847–882, doi:10.3982/ECTA6420.
- A Continuous-Time Version of the Principal–Agent Problem. The Review of Economic Studies 75(3), July 2008, 957–984, JSTOR 20185061.
- with Andrzej Skrzypacz: Impossibility of Collusion under Imperfect Monitoring with Flexible Production. The American Economic Review 97(5), December 2007, 1794–1823, doi:10.1257/aer.97.5.1794.
- Games with Imperfectly Observable Actions in Continuous Time. Econometrica 75(5), September 2007, 1285–1329, doi:10.1111/j.1468-0262.2007.00795.x.
- with Peter M. DeMarzo: Optimal Security Design and Dynamic Capital Structure in a Continuous-Time Agency Model. The Journal of Finance 61(6), December 2006, 2681–2724, doi:10.1111/j.1540-6261.2006.01002.x.
