= Joshua S. Friedman =

American businessman and hedge fund co-founder

- Born: 1956 (age 69–70); Boston, Massachusetts
- Education: B.A. (Harvard College) Phi Beta Kappa; M.A. (University of Oxford) Marshall Scholar; J.D. (Harvard Law School); M.B.A. (Harvard Business School) Baker Scholar
- Occupations: Investor and businessman
- Years active: 1984-present
- Employers: Goldman, Sachs & Co.; Drexel Burnham Lambert(1984-1990); Canyon Partners(1990-Present)
- Known for: Co-founder of Canyon Partners
- Title: Co-founder, Co-chairman and CEO of Canyon Partners

Joshua S. Friedman (born 1956) is an American businessman and co-founder of Los Angeles–based hedge fund Canyon Partners.

== Early life and education ==
Friedman grew up near Boston. His father was a mechanical engineer who served during World War II before he finished college. His mother was a public-school teacher.

He graduated summa cum laude from Harvard College in 1976, where he studied physics. In 1978 he went to the University of Oxford on a Marshall Scholarship where he received a master's degree in politics and economics, graduating with honors. He then returned to Harvard as a Baker Scholar, earning an M.B.A. from the Harvard Business School in 1980. He graduated magna cum laude from Harvard Law School, where he was the recipient of the 1982 Sears Prize.

== Early career ==
After completing his studies at Harvard, Friedman was employed at Goldman, Sachs & Co., where he worked in their M&A group. In 1983 Friedman joined Drexel Burnham Lambert and later became director of capital markets for high yield and private placements.

== Canyon Partners ==
In 1990, Friedman and Mitchell Julis co-founded Canyon Partners, an employee-owned alternative asset management company that is headquartered in Los Angeles, California.

== Awards and honors ==
Friedman is a recipient of Institutional Investor's "Lifetime Achievement" award in 2014, he's considered a pioneer in the hedge fund industry. In 2019, Friedman and his wife were recipients of the Ellis Island Medal of Honor.

== Philanthropy ==
Friedman is a member of the Board of Directors of Harvard Management Company, the Harvard Business School Board of Dean's Advisors and the Harvard University Task Force on Science and Engineering. Friedman serves as a Trustee for the Andrew W. Mellon Foundation, the California Institute of Technology (Caltech), the Los Angeles Philharmonic, and the Los Angeles County Museum of Art (LACMA). He is a member of the Investment Committees for the Broad Foundation, the J. Paul Getty Trust and chair of the LACMA Finance Committee. He also serves on the Boards of Advisors of the UCLA Hospital Department of Neurosurgery and the UCLA Anderson School of Management.
