= Atif Mian =

Pakistani-American economist (born 1975)

- Born: Atif Rehman Mian; June 28, 1975 (age 51); Lahore, Punjab, Pakistan
- Occupation: Economist

Academic background
- Education: Massachusetts Institute of Technology (BA, MA, PhD)
- Thesis: Three Essays in Governance and Banking (2001)
- Doctoral advisor: Abhijit Banerjee; Sendhil Mullainathan

Atif Rehman Mian (Urdu: عاطف رحمان میاں; born 28 June 1975) is a Pakistani-American economist who serves as the John H. Laporte Jr. Class of 1967 Professor of Economics, Public Policy, and Finance at Princeton University, and as the director of the Julis-Rabinowitz Center for Public Policy and Finance at the Princeton School of Public and International Affairs. He received a Guggenheim Fellowship in 2021, and was elected Fellow of the Econometric Society in 2021.

His work focuses on the connections between finance and the macro economy. He is the first person of Pakistani origin to rank among the top 25 young economists of the world. In 2014, the International Monetary Fund (IMF) identified Atif as one of twenty-five young economists who it expects will shape the world's thinking about the global economy in the future.

== Early life and education ==
Mian was born in Pakistan to Ahmadi parents who were government physicians. He grew up and received most of his early education in Pakistan. Later, he pursued engineering and received a scholarship to study at the Massachusetts Institute of Technology (MIT) at the age of 17. During his undergraduate studies, he shifted his focus to mathematics and computer science before studying economics. He completed his undergraduate degree in 1996 and later briefly attended Princeton University. He returned to Massachusetts Institute of Technology to earn his PhD in 2001, with a dissertation on banking and governance.

== Career ==
Mian was a professor at the University of Chicago from 2001 to 2009 before moving to the University of California, Berkeley, where he taught until 2012. In 2012, he joined the faculty at Princeton.

In September 2018, Pakistani Prime Minister Imran Khan appointed Mian, an Ahmadi Muslim, to serve on the Economic Advisory Council to provide assistance on issues of economics and finance. His appointment was criticized by groups opposed to government representation for religious minorities, and Mian was asked to resign a week after his appointment. As a result, Asim Ijaz Khwaja and Imran Rasul resigned from the council in protest. Mian's removal from the EAC received worldwide condemnation, including an open letter by leading economists including many Nobel laureates. International media outlets such as The Economist and Financial Times also criticised the move.

== Writing ==
Atif is the author of the critically acclaimed book House of Debt (with Amir Sufi, University of Chicago Press, 2014). The book argues that debt caused the Great Recession—rather than failing banks, as the Bush and Obama administrations had diagnosed. His book was shortlisted for the Financial Times Business Book of the Year, and it won the Gordon J. Laing Prize of the University of Chicago Press.

== Personal life ==
Around 1999, Atif Mian married his wife Ayesha, who he knew since childhood. They have three children, two daughters and a son.

== Recognition ==
In 2021 Mian was named a Fellow of the Econometric Society. He received a Guggenheim Fellowship in 2021. In 2014, the International Monetary Fund (IMF) identified Atif as one of twenty-five young economists who it expects will shape the world's thinking about the global economy in the future.
