= Jean-Pierre Landau =

French civil servant

- Born: 16 November 1946 (age 79); Paris, France
- Education: HEC Paris; Sciences Po; ENA
- Occupation: Civil servant

Jean-Pierre Landau (born 16 November 1946) is a high-ranking French civil servant.

== Career ==
Jean-Pierre Landau studied at HEC Paris, then at Sciences Po. He is a student of the École nationale d'administration (Simone Weil Promotion, 1974).

In 1974 Landau joined the General Inspection of Finances. From 1989 to 1993, he served as Executive Director for France at the International Monetary Fund and the World Bank in Washington D.C.

Back at the French General Inspection of Finances from 1996 to 1998, he then became Executive director for the French Banks Association.

From 2001 to 2006, Landau served as Executive Director for France at the European Bank for Reconstruction and Development, while doing financial consulting for the French Embassy in London.

From 2006 to 2011, Landau was Second Deputy Governor of the Banque de France, a member of the board of directors of the Bank for International Settlements (BIS) and a member of the Financial Stability Forum. He is also deputy at the G7 and G20 and member of the OECD workgroup devoted to economic and financial policy (WP3).

In January 2014, Landau wrote a Financial Times opinion piece that was critical of Bitcoin, a digital currency. He suggested that for a currency to be successful it needs a central bank to decide on changes to the money supply. If the supply of a currency is too small it will not be sufficient for the needs of an economy. He contends that because the number of Bitcoin will reach a predetermined limit the supply will be insufficient to satisfy the demand.

== Other activities ==
- Fondation Chirac, Member of the Jury for the Prize for Conflict Prevention (since 2012)
- Centre for Economic Policy Research (CEPR), Member of the Board of Trustees

== Publications ==
- Jean-Pierre Landau, Les nouvelles contributions financières internationales : Financement et développement et taxation internationale , Paris, 2004.
- Jean-Pierre Landau, François Benaroya, L'échange international, Paris, Presses universitaires de France, coll. « Que sais-je ? », 1999, numéro 1727.
- Jean-Pierre Landau, EMU and the Franco-German relationship in David P. Calleo, Eric R. Staal, Europe's Franco-German Engine, Washington Brookings Institution Press, 1999
- Jean-Pierre Landau, An International Financial Architecture for the 21st Century

== Also refer to ==
- Banque de France
- International Monetary Fund
- World Bank
- General Inspection of Finances (France)

== External links and references ==
- http://www.banque-france.fr/gb/instit/telechar/discours/2010/International-monetary-arrangements-Pekin.pdf
