= Beata Javorcik =

Polish economist

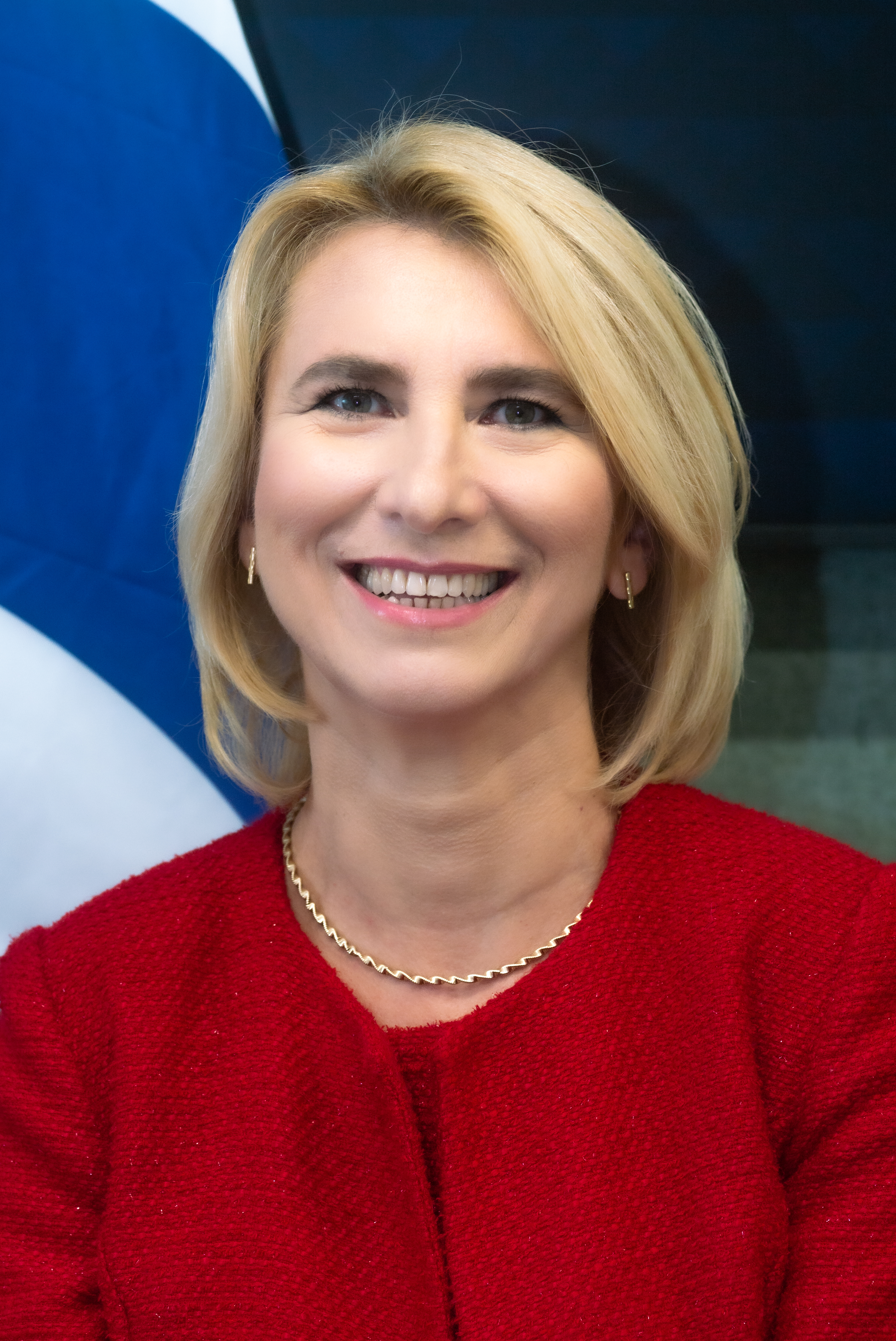
- Born: Beata Smarzynska Javorcik
- Education: University of Rochester; Yale University
- Occupation: Economist

Beata Smarzynska Javorcik is a Polish economist who is currently the Chief Economist at the European Bank for Reconstruction and Development (EBRD). She is the first woman to hold this position. She is also the first woman to hold a statutory professorship in economics at the University of Oxford. She is a former senior economist of the Development Economics Research Group at the World Bank, where she previously served as a Country Economist for Azerbaijan, Europe, and the Central Asia Region and was involved in research activities regarding lending operations and policy advice. She is also a program director of the International Trade and Regional Economics Programme at the Centre for Economic Policy Research in London. Her other affiliations include the Royal Economic Society in London, CESifo in Munich, International Growth Centre in London, and the Centre for Research on Globalization and Economic Policy at the University of Nottingham.

Javorcik holds an editorial position at the World Bank Economic Review, and formerly held editorial positions at Economic Policy, Journal of International Economics, Oxford Bulletin of Economics and Statistics, and Oxford Economic Papers. Her research interests are in the fields of international trade, foreign direct investment, investment promotion, and tax evasion. Her research also explores how developing countries and transition economies are able to harness globalization to stimulate their economic growth.

== Early life and education ==
In May 1994, Javorcik graduated from the University of Rochester with Bachelor of Arts in Economics. She earned a Ph.D. in Economics from Yale University, where she studied International Trade and Development Economics.

== Career ==
Prior to obtaining her Ph.D, Javorcik was hired as a research assistant at the Chief Economist Office of the European Bank (EBRD) in London.

After earning her PhD, in 1999 Javorcik started working at the World Bank in Washington D.C., where she was initially a young professional of the Development Economics Research Group, and after one year she served a position as a country economist for Azerbaijan, Europe, and Central Asia Region. In 2001, she was an economist at the Development of Economics Research Group of the World Bank and finally in 2004 she became a senior economist at the Development of Economics Research Group of the World Bank.

Once she left from her position at the World Bank in 2007, Javorcik became involved in teaching at the University of Oxford, where she started as a fellow and tutor in Economics at Christ Church, Oxford, and at the same time served as a reader in economics for three years (2007–2010) at the University of Oxford. In 2010, she was a professor of International Economics. In 2014, Javorcik was the first woman to hold position of a Statutory Professorship of Economics at the University of Oxford. In the same year, she started as a professorial fellow at All Souls College Oxford, in which position she is currently on leave.

In February 2019, the EBRD appointed Javorcik as its new chief economist; she is the first woman who has ever held this position.

In 2020, Javorcik was appointed by the World Health Organization’s Regional Office for Europe to serve as a member of the Pan-European Commission on Health and Sustainable Development, chaired by Mario Monti.

== Publications ==
Javorcik's works regarding determinants and consequences of inflow of Foreign Direct Investment have been reprinted and featured in several publications, such as Multinational Enterprise and Host Economies by K. Meyer (2008), Globalization and Productivity by D. Greenaway, H. Gorg and R. Kneller (2008), Financial Times "Investors See Corruption as Barriers" by Alan Beattie (2000).

== Affiliations and advisory roles ==
- Editorial Board Member, The World Bank Economic Review
- External Research Fellow, Centre for Research on Globalization and Economic Policy, University of Nottingham
- Executive Committee and Council Member, Royal Economic Society, London
- Member, International Trade program, International Growth Centre, London
- Program Director, International Trade and Regional Economics Programme, Centre for Economic Policy Research, London
- Research Network Fellow, CESifo, Munich

=== Previous positions ===
- 2003–2015: Research affiliate, Centre for Economic Policy Research, London
- 2007–2010: Editorial board member, Oxford Economics Papers
- 2007–2017: Co-editor, Oxford Bulletin of Economics and Statistics
- 2016–2019: associate editor, Journal of International Economics
- 2017–2019: managing editor, Economic Journal

=== Advisory roles ===
- 2009: Economics Advisory group for the Foresight Project, the Department of Business, Innovation, and Skills (BIS)
- 2015–2016: Besley Commission, European Bank for Reconstruction and Development (EBRD)
- 2018–2019: Evaluation Steering Group, CDC Group (DFID)
- 2016–present: Strategic advisory board, Kiel Centre for Globalization
- 2016–present: Strategic advisory board, School of Economics at the University of Nottingham

== Grants and honors ==
Year	Grants/Honors	Institution
2015–2017	British Academy Newton Fund Grant	The British Academy
2001–2007	Awarded 5 Research Support Grants	World Bank
1998	Yale Dissertation Fellowship	Yale University
1997–1998	Ryoichi Sasakawa Young Leaders Fellowship Fund	Sylff Association
1996	Ford Foundation Grant	Ford Foundation
1995	Isaac Sherman Post-Graduate Fellowship	
1994	William Morse Hastings Prize for Essay in Economics	University of Rochester
1993–1994	Phi Beta Kappa	Phi Beta Kappa
