= David Forbes Hendry =

British econometrician (born 1944)

- Born: 6 March 1944 (age 82); Nottingham, England
- Education: University of Aberdeen, London School of Economics
- Known for: Dynamic Econometrics, Forecasting, Model Selection, Monte Carlo Simulation, Mis-Specification Testing, Progressive Research Methodology, LSE approach to econometrics, Autometrics, PcGive, OxMetrics, Gets Modeling
- Awards: Guy Medal (Bronze, 1986)
- Scientific career
- Fields: Econometrics
- Workplaces: University of Oxford
- Doctoral advisor: John Denis Sargan
- Website: www.nuff.ox.ac.uk/users/hendry

Sir David Forbes Hendry, FBA CStat (born 6 March 1944) is a British econometrician, currently a professor of economics and from 2001 to 2007 was head of the economics department at the University of Oxford. He is also a professorial fellow at Nuffield College, Oxford.

He was born in Nottingham to Scottish parents, and obtained an M.A. in economics with first class honours from the University of Aberdeen in 1966. He then went to the London School of Economics and completed an MSc (with distinction) in Econometrics and Mathematical Economics in 1967. He received his PhD from the London School of Economics under the supervision of John Denis Sargan in 1970, and until joining the University of Oxford as professor of economics in 1982, was a lecturer, then reader and finally professor of economics at the LSE. Hendry also served as a research professor at Duke University from 1987 until 1991.

His work is predominantly on time series econometrics and the econometrics of the demand for money. In recent years he has worked on the theory of forecasting and also on automated model building. He also studies the econometrics of climate change as co-director of the Climate Econometrics research centre at Nuffield College, Oxford.

He was elected a fellow of the British Academy, a fellow of the Econometric Society, honorary member of the American Economic Association and foreign honorary member of the American Academy of Arts and Sciences.

In 2001 he received an honorary doctorate (dr. philos. h.c.) from The Norwegian University of Science and Technology (NTNU). He has received seven other honorary doctorates.

He was knighted in the 2009 Birthday Honours.

His most recent book is Hendry, D.F. and B. Nielsen (2007), Econometric Modeling: A Likelihood Approach (Princeton University Press).

"The Methodology and Practice of Econometrics: A Festschrift in Honour of David F. Hendry", edited by Jennifer L. Castle and Neil Shephard, was published by Oxford University Press in 2009.

== Selected publications ==
Books

- Hendry, D.F. (1995). Dynamic Econometrics. Oxford: Oxford University Press. (ISBN 0-19-828317-2)

Journal articles

- Hendry, D.F. and P.K. Trivedi (1972). "Maximum likelihood estimation of difference equations with moving-average errors: A simulation study". Review of Economic Studies, 32, 117–145.
- Hendry, D.F. and R.W. Harrison (1974). "Monte Carlo methodology and the small sample behaviour of ordinary and two-stage least squares." Journal of Econometrics, 2, 151–174.
- Hendry, D. F. (1974). "Stochastic Specification in an Aggregate Demand Model of the United Kingdom." Econometrica 42(3): 559–578.
- Hendry, D.F. (1976). "Discussion of 'estimation of linear functional relationships: Approximate distributions and connections with simultaneous equations in econometrics" by T.W. Anderson. Journal of the Royal Statistical Society B, 38, 24–25.
- Hendry, D.F. (1976)." The structure of simultaneous equations estimators". Journal of Econometrics, 4, 51–88.
- Hendry, D. F. and F. Srba (1977). "The Properties of Autoregressive Instrumental Variables Estimators in Dynamic Systems." Econometrica 45(5): 969–990.
- Davidson, J.E.H., D.F. Hendry, F. Srba, and J.S. Yeo (1978). "Econometric modelling of the aggregate time-series relationship between consumers' expenditure and income in the United Kingdom." Economic Journal, 88, 661–692.
- Hendry, D.F. and G.E. Mizon (1978). Serial correlation as a convenient simplification, not a nuisance: A comment on a study of the demand for money by the Bank of England. Economic Journal, 88, 549–563.
- Hendry, D.F. (1979). The behaviour of inconsistent instrumental variables estimators in dynamic systems with autocorrelated errors. Journal of Econometrics, 9, 295–314.
- Hendry, D.F. and F. Srba (1980). "AUTOREG: A computer program library for dynamic econometric models with autoregressive errors". Journal of Econometrics,"9 12, 85–102.
- Mizon, G.E. and D.F. Hendry (1980). "An empirical application and Monte Carlo analysis of tests of dynamic specification." Review of Economic Studies," 49, 21–45.
- Engle, R. F., D. F. Hendry and J.-F. Richard (1983). "Exogeneity." Econometrica 51(2): 277–304.
- Chong, Y. Y. and D. F. Hendry (1986). "Econometric Evaluation of Linear Macro-Economic Models." Review of Economic Studies 53(4): 671–690.
- Hendry, D.F., A.J. Neale, and F. Srba (1988). "Econometric analysis of small linear systems using PC-FIML." Journal of Econometrics, 38, 203–226.
- Campos, J., N.R. Ericsson, and D.F. Hendry (1990). An analogue model of phase-averaging procedures. Journal of Econometrics, 43, 275–292.
- Hendry, D. F. and N. R. Ericsson (1991). "An Econometric Analysis of UK Money Demand in Monetary Trends in the United States and the United Kingdom by Milton Friedman and Anna J. Schwartz." American Economic Review: 8–38.
- Baba, Y., D.F. Hendry, and R.M. Starr (1992). "The demand for M1 in the U.S.A., 1960–1988." Review of Economic Studies, 59, 25–61.
- Robert F. Engle and D.F. Hendry (1993). "Testing super exogeneity and invariance in regression models." Journal of Econometrics, 56, 119–139.
- Govaerts, B., D.F. Hendry, and J.-F. Richard (1994). "Encompassing in stationary linear dynamic models." Journal of Econometrics, 63, 245–270.
- Hendry, D.F. (1995). "Econometrics and business cycle empirics." Economic Journal, 105, 1622–1636.
- Campos, J., N.R. Ericsson, and D.F. Hendry (1996). "Cointegration tests in the presence of structural breaks." Journal of Econometrics, 70, 187–220.
- Clements, M.P. and D.F. Hendry (1996). "Intercept corrections and structural change." Journal of Applied Econometrics, 11, 475–494.
- Hendry, D.F. (1997). "The Econometrics of Macro-economic Forecasting." Economic Journal, 107, 1330–1357.
- Ericsson, N. R., D. F. Hendry and G. E. Mizon (1998). "Exogeneity, Cointegration, and Economic Policy Analysis." Journal of Business & Economic Statistics 16(4): 370–387.
- Hendry, D.F. and Krolzig, H-M. (1999). "Improving on 'Data Mining Reconsidered' by K.D. Hoover and S.J. Perez." Econometrics Journal, 2, 41–58.

== Other publications ==
- Campos, J., N. R. Ericsson and D. F. Hendry (2005). General-to-Specific Modeling: An Overview and Selected Bibliography. International Finance Discussion Papers, board of governors of the Federal Reserve System.
- Campos, J., D. F. Hendry and H.-M. Krolzig (2003). "Consistent Model Selection by an Automatic by Automatic Gets Approach." Oxford Bulletin of Economics and Statistics 65(Supplement): 803–819.
- Castle, J. L., J. A. Doornik and D. F. Hendry (2012). "Model Selection when there are Multiple Breaks." Journal of Econometrics 169(2): 239–246.
- Castle, J. L., J. A. Doornik and D. F. Hendry (2013). "Evaluating Automatic Model Selection." Journal of Time Series Econometrics 3(3): 1941–1928.
- Castle, J. L., J. A. Doornik and D. F. Hendry (2013). "Model Selection in Equations with Many 'Small' Effects*." Oxford Bulletin of Economics and Statistics 75(1): 6–22.
- Castle, J. L., J. A. Doornik, D. F. Hendry, et al. (2013). "Mis-Specification Testing: Non-Invariance of Expectations Models of Inflation." Econometric Reviews: 130809194007000.
- Castle, J. L. and D. F. Hendry (2013). "Model selection in under-specified equations facing breaks." Journal of Econometrics.
- Chong, Y. Y. and D. F. Hendry (1986). "Econometric Evaluation of Linear Macro-Economic Models." The Review of Economic Studies 53(4): 671–690.
- Clements, M. P. and D. F. Hendry (2005). "Evaluating a Model by Forecast Performance." Oxford Bulletin of Economics and Statistics 67: 931–956.
- Davidson, J. E. H., D. F. Hendry, F. Srba, et al. (1978). "Econometric Modelling of the Aggregate Time-Series Relationship Between Consumers' Expenditure and Income in the United Kingdom." The Economic Journal 88(352): 661–692.
- Doornik, J. A., D. F. Hendry and F. Pretis (2013). Step Indicator Saturation. Department of Economics Discussion Paper Series, University of Oxford.
- Robert F. Engle, D. F. Hendry and J.-F. Richard (1983). "Exogeneity". Econometrica 51(2): 277–304.
- Ericsson, N. R., D. F. Hendry and G. E. Mizon (1998). "Exogeneity, Cointegration, and Economic Policy Analysis." Journal of Business & Economic Statistics 16(4): 370–387.
- Ermini, L. and D. F. Hendry (2008). "Log Income vs. Linear Income: An Application of the Encompassing Principle*." Oxford Bulletin of Economics and Statistics 70: 807–827.
- Florens, J.-P., D. F. Hendry and J.-F. Richard (1996). "Encompassing and Specificity." Econometric Theory 12(4): 620–656.
- Granger, C. W. J. and D. F. Hendry (2005). "A Dialogue Concerning a New Instrument for Econometric Modeling." Econometric Theory 21: 278–297.
- Hendry, D. (1993). Econometrics: Alchemy of Science?, Oxford.
- Hendry, D. F. (1974). "Stochastic Specification in an Aggregate Demand Model of the United Kingdom." Econometrica 42(3): 559–578.
- Hendry, D. F. (1980). "Econometrics – Alchemy or Science?" Economica 47(188): 387–406.
- Hendry, D. F. (1991). "Using PC-NAIVE in Teaching Econometrics." Oxford Bulletin of Economics and Statistics 53(2): 199–223.
- Hendry, D. F. (2000). Econometrics: Alchemy or Science?, Oxford University Press.
- Hendry, D. F. (2001). "Achievements and Challenges in Econometric Methodology." Journal of Econometrics 100: 7–10.
- Hendry, D. F. (2003). "J. Denis Sargan and the Origins of LSE Econometric Methodology." Econometric Theory 19: 457–480.
- Hendry, D. F. (2011). "Empirical Economic Model Discovery and Theory Evaluation." Rationality, Markets and Morals 2: 115–145.
- Hendry, D. F. and M. P. Clements (2003). "Economic forecasting: some lessons from recent research." Economic Modelling 20(2): 301–329.
- Hendry, D. F. and N. R. Ericsson (1991). "An Econometric Analysis of UK Money Demand in Monetary Trends in the United States and the United Kingdom by Milton Friedman and Anna J. Schwartz". American Economic Review: 8–38.
- Hendry, D. F. and Søren Johansen (2011). The Properties of Model Selection when Retaining Theory Variables. CREATES Research Papers. Aarhus University.
- Hendry, D. F. and Søren Johansen (2013). Model Discovery and Trygve Haavelmo's Legacy. Working Paper. University of Oxford.
- Hendry, D. F., Søren Johansen and C. Santos (2008). "Automatic Selection of Indicators in a Fully Saturated Regression." Computational Statistics 33: 317–335.
- Hendry, D. F. and K. Juselius (2001). "Explaining Cointegration Part II." Energy Journal 22(1): 75–120.
- Hendry, D. F. and K. Juselius (2000). "Explaining Cointegration Part I." Energy Journal 21: 1–42.
- Hendry, D. F. and H.-M. Krolzig (2001). "Computer Automation of General-to-Specific Model Selection Procedures." Journal of Economic Dynamics and Control 25: 831–866.
- Hendry, D. F. and H.-M. Krolzig (2003). New Developments in Automatic General-to-specific Modelling. Econometrics and the Philosophy of Economics. B. P. Stigum, Princeton University Press.
- Hendry, D. F. and H.-M. Krolzig (2004). "Automatic Model Selection: A New Instrument for Social Science." Electoral Studies 23(3): 525–544.
- Hendry, D. F. and H.-M. Krolzig (2005). "The Properties of Automatic GETS Modelling*." The Economic Journal 115(502): C32-C61.
- Hendry, D. F. and M. Massmann (2007). "Co-Breaking : Recent Advances and a Synopsis of the Literature." Journal of Business & Economic Statistics 25(1): 33–51.
- Hendry, D. F. and G. E. Mizon (2013). Unpredictability in Economic Analysis, Econometric Modeling and Forecasting. Working Paper. Department of Economics Working Paper, Oxford University.
- Hendry, D. F. and J.-F. Richard (1983). "The Econometric Analysis of Economic Time Series." International Statistical Review 51(2): 111–148.
- Hendry, D. F. and F. Srba (1977). "The Properties of Autoregressive Instrumental Variables Estimators in Dynamic Systems." Econometrica 45(5): 969–990.
- Spanos, A., D. F. Hendry and J. James Reade (2008). "Linear vs. Log-linear Unit-Root Specification: An Application of Mis-specification Encompassing*." Oxford Bulletin of Economics and Statistics 70: 829–847.

Other authors

- Søren Johansen and B. Nielsen (2009). Saturation by Indicators in Regression Models. The Methodology and Practice of Econometrics: Festschrift in Honour of David F. Hendry. J. L. Castle and N. Shephard. Oxford, Oxford University Press.
- Clive Granger (2009). In Praise of Pragmatics in Econometrics. The Methodology and Practice of Econometrics: A Festschrift in Honour of David F. Hendry. J. L. Castle and N. Shephard. Oxford, Oxford University Press.
