= Denise R. Osborn =

Australian and British economist (born 1948)

- Born: 23 November 1948 (age 77)

Academic background
- Education: London School of Economics (Ph.D. 1976); University of Sydney (M.Ec. 1972); University of Sydney (B.Ec. 1970)

Academic work
- Discipline: Econometric; Applied Time Series; Seasonality; Inflation; International Business Cycles; Macroeconomic Model
- Institutions: Royal Economic Society; University of Manchester

Denise Rae Osborn (born 23 November 1948) is an Australian and British economist who currently works as the Secretary-General at the Royal Economic Society and as an Emeritus Professor of Econometrics at the University of Manchester. Her principal research interests have been in applied Time-Series modelling, particularly in seasonality in economic variables and dynamic modelling of macroeconomic relationships. Osborn has over 70 research publications in referred academic journals including Journal of Business and Economic Statistics, Journal of Econometrics, Journal of Applied Econometrics, Journal of the Royal Statistical Society, and Journal of the American Statistical Association.

== Education ==
Denise R. Osborn attended the University of Sydney in 1966, completing the Bachelor of Economics with First Class Honours in 1970, and the Master of Economics in 1972. After that, she left Australia and went to the United Kingdom. She attended the London School of Economics and obtained her PhD in econometrics under the supervision of Professor Kenneth Frank Wallis in 1976 with her thesis title: Time series analysis and dynamic specification in econometric models, with an application to the Australian wool market.

== Career ==
In 1972, Osborn started as a Teaching Fellow at the Department of Economic Statistics in the University of Sydney. While she was pursuing her PhD, she worked as a research Officer for the National Institute of Economic and Social Research in London from 1975 to 1977. After that, Osborn arrived at the University of Manchester and took up the role as a Lecturer in Econometrics from 1977 to 1989. She was then promoted and worked as a Senior Lecturer from 1989 to 1992. In 1992, Osborn became a Professor of Econometrics as she was awarded with a personal Chair, and four years later in 1996, she was promoted to the Robert Ottley Chair in Econometrics and became a Robert Ottley Professor of Econometrics. In 2013, Osborn switched up the role and became a part-time Professor of Econometrics until 2015. Since then, she has been an Emeritus Professor of Econometrics at the University of Manchester. At the University of Manchester, Osborn has also held various of positions, including the Interim Head of the School of Social Sciences from September to December 2003, the Director of Research for the School of Economic Studies from 1994 to 1997, the Head of the School of Economic Studies from 1997 to 2002, and the Head of Economics from 2009 to 2011.

While primarily working at the University of Manchester, Osborn has had other visiting positions. In May 2004, she arrived at the Department of Econometrics and Business Statistics in Monash University as an Academic Visitor. She was also the Adjunct Professor in the Department of Economics at Australian National University from July to September 2006. After, Osborn visited the School of Economics and Finance, University of Tasmania as a Visiting Fellow in 2012, and as a Visiting Professor from 2013 to 2016.

== External roles ==
=== Royal Economic Society (RES) ===
Osborn was the Conference Chair of RES in 1994, and from 1994 to 1999, she acted as a member of council and executive committee. Osborn was the Inaugural Chair of Women's Committee the Council from 1996 to 1998. In 1998, she became a member of the Conference of Heads of University Departments of Economics (CHUDE) steering Committee until 2003, and again in 2007. From 2004 to 2006, she participated as the Chairperson of CHUDE and she was also a member of Women's Committee from 2007 to 2011. In 2015, Osborn took over the role as the Secretary-General at the Royal Economic Society, and she is the first woman Secretary-General since 1890.

=== Research Assessment Exercises (RAE) ===
Osborn participated at the UK Research Assessment Exercises 2001 (REA2001) as the Vice Chair and member of the Economics and Econometrics Panel. In the UK RAE 2008, she was originally joined as member of both the Economics and Econometrics, and the Business and Management Studies Sub-Panel. But later, due to the stepped down of Professor David Greenaway, Osborn became the Chair of Economics and Econometrics Sub-Panel and the member of Main Panel I.

Osborn also participated at the Hong Kong Research Assessment Exercises in 2014, as a Deputy Panel Convenor of Business and Economics.

=== Other ===
- Research Associate, Centre for Applied Macroeconomics Analysis (CAMA) in Australian National University, since 2005.
- Distinguished Fellow, Granger Centre in University of Nottingham, since 2013.
- External Fellow, Centre for Macro and Financial Econometrics in University of Essex, since 2014.
- Member of the UK Government Statistical Service Methodology Advisory Committee, 2012–2020.
- Member of the Training Board of the UK Economic and Social Research Council, 1999–2003.

== Research publications ==
=== Book ===
- The Econometric Analysis of Seasonal Time Series (with Eric Ghysels). Cambridge UP, New York, 2001.

=== Selected refereed journals articles ===
- Trend-cycle-seasonal interactions: Identification and estimation (with Irma Hindrayanto, Jan P. A. M. Jacobs and Jing Tian), Macroeconomic Dynamics, 2019, vol 23(8), 3163–3188.
- China's increasing global influence: Change in international growth linkages (with Erdenebat Bataa and Marianne Sensier), Economic Modelling, 2018, vol. 74, 194–206.
- The asymptotic behaviour of the residual sum of squares in models with multiple break points (with Alastair R. Hall and Nikolaos Sakkas), Econometric Reviews, 2017, vol.36(6-9), 667-698.
- What is the globalisation of inflation? (with Gantungalag Altansukh, Ralf Becker, and George Bratsiotis). Journal of Economic Dynamics and Control, 2017, vol. 74(1), pp. 1–27.
- Changes in the global oil market (with Erdenebat Bataa and Marwan Izzeldin), Energy Economics, 2016, 56, pp. 161–176.
- Structural break inference using information criteria in models estimated by two stage least squares (with Alastair R Hall and Nikolaos Sakkas), Journal of Time Series Analysis, 2015, vol. 36(5), pp. 741–762.
- Growth in China and the US: Effects on a Small Commodity Exporter (with Tugrul Vehbi), Economic Modelling, 2015, vol. 45, pp. 268–277.
- The performance of lag selection and detraining methods for HEGY seasonal unit root tests (with Tomas del Barrio Castro and A.M. Robert Taylor), Econometric Reviews, 2014, vol. 35(1), pp. 122–168.
- International transmissions to Australia: The roles of the US and Euro area (with Mardi Dungey and Mala Raghavan), Economic Record, 2014, vol. 90 (issue 291), pp. 421–446.
- Modelling large open economies with international linkages: The US and Euro Area (with Mardi Dungey), Journal of Applied Econometrics, 2014, vol. 29(3), pp. 377–393.
- Identifying changes in mean, seasonality, persistence and volatility for G7 and Euro area inflation (with Erdenebat Bataa, Marianne Sensier and Dick van Dijk), Oxford Bulletin of Economics and Statistics, 2014, vol. 76(3 ), pp. 360–388.
- Inference on structural breaks using information criteria (with Alastair R Hall and Nikolaos Sakkas), Manchester School, 2013, vol. 81(S3), pp. 54–81.
- Structural breaks in the international dynamics of inflation (with Erdenebat Bataa, Marianne Sensier and Dick van Dijk), Review of Economics and Statistics, 2013, vol. 95(2), pp. 646–659.
- Ratio-based estimators for a change point in persistence (with Andreea G. Halunga), Journal of Econometrics, 2012, vol. 171, pp. 24–31.
- A threshold cointegration analysis of interest rate pass-through to UK mortgage rates (with Ralf Becker and Dilem Yildirim), Economic Modelling, 2012, vol. 29, pp. 2504–2513.

=== Selected book chapters ===
- Forecasting seasonal time series (with Eric Ghysels and Paulo Rodrigues), Chapter 13 (pp. 659–711) in Handbook of Economic Forecasting, Volume 1 (eds. Graham Elliott, C.W.W. Granger and Alan Timmermann), Elsevier, Amsterdam, 2006.
- Nonlinearity and structural change in interest rate reaction functions for the US, UK and Germany (with Mehtap Kesriyeli and Marianne Sensier), Chapter 11 (pp. 283–310) in Nonlinear Time Series Analysis of Business Cycles (ed. Costas Milas, Philip Rothman and Dick van Dijk), Contributions to Economic Analysis 276, Elsevier, Amsterdam, 2006.
- Unit root versus deterministic representations of seasonality for forecasting. Chapter 18 (pp. 409–431) in Michael P. Clements and David F. Hendry (eds.), A Companion to Forecasting, Blackwell Publishers. Ltd, Malden, Massachusetts, US, 2002.
- Seasonal nonstationarity and near-nonstationarity (with Eric Ghysels and Paulo Rodrigues). Chapter 31 (pp. 655–677) in Badi H. Baltagi (ed.), A Companion to Theoretical Econometrics, Blackwell Publishers Ltd., Malden Massachusetts, US, 2001.
- Forecasting and the UK business cycle (with Marianne Sensier and Paul Simpson). Chapter 7 (pp. 104–123) in D.F. Handry and N.R. Ericsson (eds.), Understanding Economic Forecasts, Cambridge, Massachusetts: MIT Press, 2001.
- An investigation into quarterly crime and its relationship to the economy. Chapter 5 (pp. 75–101) in Ziggy MacDonald and David Pyle (eds.), Illicit Activity: The Economics of Crime, Drugs and Tax Fraud, Aldershot: Ashgate Publishers, 2000.
