= Katarina Juselius =

Finnish economist

Academic background
- Education: Hanken School of Economics
- Doctoral advisor: Johan Fellman
- Influences: David F. Hendry, Clive Granger, Søren Johansen

Academic work
- Discipline: Statistics; Econometrics
- Notable ideas: Cointegration, VAR modelling

Katarina Juselius (born 25 September 1943) is professor Emeritus of econometrics and empirical economics at the University of Copenhagen. Her work has been on empirical macro models and associated issues.

She obtained her Lic.Econ.Sc. and PhD from the Swedish School of Economics and Business Administration in Helsinki.

== Research ==
She is the 271st most quoted economist in the world according to IDEAS and her research has been quoted 27000 times. She is also on the editorial board of Journal of Economic Methodology. Her most quoted paper, "Maximum likelihood estimation and inference on cointegration—with applications to the demand for money" has been quoted over 16000 times.

== Personal life ==
She is married to Søren Johansen who is also a professor of econometrics at the same university.

== Selected publications ==
- Juselius, K. (2006). The Cointegrated VAR Model: Methodology and Applications. Oxford University Press. ISBN 0-19-928566-7.
- Johansen, S.; Juselius, K. (1990). "Maximum Likelihood Estimation and Inference on Cointegration—with Applications to the Demand for Money". Oxford Bulletin of Economics and Statistics. 52 (2): 169–210. doi:10.1111/j.1468-0084.1990.mp52002003.x.
- Johansen, S.; Juselius, K. (1992). "Testing Structural Hypotheses in a Multivariate Cointegration Analysis of the PPP and the UIP for UK". Journal of Econometrics. 53 (1): 211–244. doi:10.1016/0304-4076(92)90086-7.
