= Dennis Novy =

British economist

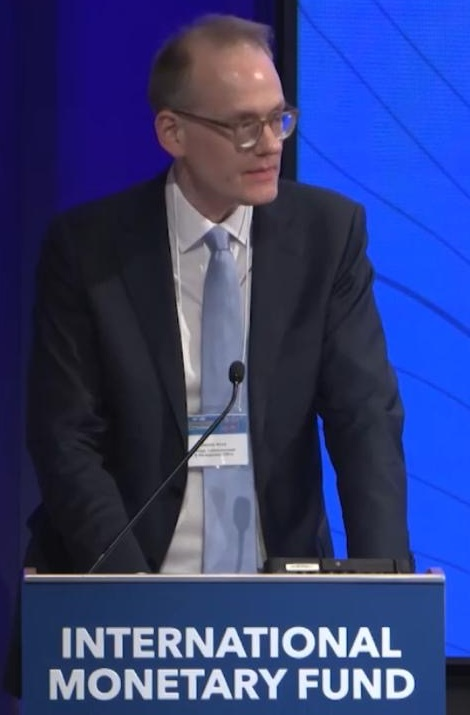
- Novy speaking at the International Monetary Fund in November 2025
- Born: Dennis Novy
- Occupation: Economist

Academic work
- Discipline: International Trade; International Finance; Macroeconomics; Economic History
- Institutions: University of Warwick; University of Cambridge; Humboldt University of Berlin

Dennis Novy is a British economist and academic. He is a professor of economics at the University of Warwick and a Research Fellow at the Centre for Economic Policy Research.

In spring 2025 Novy was appointed as Chief Economist and Director of Analysis at the UK Foreign, Commonwealth and Development Office with effect from October 2025.

== Early life and career ==
Novy was born in Germany. He received a PhD in economics from the University of Cambridge in 2007. He has been a member of the economics department at the University of Warwick since 2006. He is an Associate at the Centre for Economic Performance at the London School of Economics, and he is also affiliated with CESifo in Munich and Rockwool Foundation Berlin.

Novy served as Specialist Adviser to the House of Lords on the Transatlantic Trade and Investment Partnership in 2013 to 2014. He was appointed to the UK Council of Economic Advisers at HM Treasury by the Chancellor of the Exchequer in 2018 to 2019. He was a member of the Economic Advisory Council of the British Chambers of Commerce from 2023 to 2025. He was the Impact Director of the CAGE research centre at the University of Warwick from 2022 to 2025.

== Research ==
Novy's research focuses on international trade, international finance, macroeconomics and economic history. He currently serves as an Associate Editor of the European Economic Review.

== Works ==
- Breinlich, Holger; Leromain, Elsa; Novy, Dennis; Sampson, Thomas (2026). "Import Liberalization as Export Destruction? Evidence from the United States". American Economic Journal: Macroeconomics. 18 (3): 77–111. doi:10.1257/mac.20230213.
- Breinlich, Holger; Novy, Dennis; Santos Silva, J.M.C. (2024). "Trade, Gravity, and Aggregation". Review of Economics and Statistics. 106 (5): 1418–1426. doi:10.1162/rest_a_01234.
- Chen, Natalie; Novy, Dennis (2022). "Gravity and Heterogeneous Trade Cost Elasticities". Economic Journal. 132 (644): 1349–1377. doi:10.1093/ej/ueab067. hdl:10.1093/ej/ueab067.
- Breinlich, Holger; Leromain, Elsa; Novy, Dennis; Sampson, Thomas (2022). "The Brexit Vote, Inflation and UK Living Standards". International Economic Review. 63 (1): 63–93. doi:10.1111/iere.12541. hdl:2078.1/256964.
- Chen, Natalie; Novy, Dennis; Chung, Wanyu (2022). "Vehicle Currency Pricing and Exchange Rate Pass-Through". Journal of the European Economic Association. 20 (1): 312–351. doi:10.1093/jeea/jvab025.
- Coughlin, Cletus; Novy, Dennis (2021). "Estimating Border Effects: The Impact of Spatial Aggregation". International Economic Review. 62 (4): 1453–1487. doi:10.1111/iere.12520.
- Novy, Dennis; Taylor, Alan M. (2020). "Trade and Uncertainty". Review of Economics and Statistics. 102 (4): 749–765. doi:10.1162/rest_a_00885. hdl:10419/100381.
- Becker, Sascha O.; Fetzer, Thiemo; Novy, Dennis (2017). "Who Voted for Brexit? A Comprehensive District-Level Analysis". Economic Policy. 32 (92): 601–650. doi:10.1093/epolic/eix012.
- Novy, Dennis (2013). "International Trade without CES: Estimating Translog Gravity". Journal of International Economics. 89 (2): 271–282. doi:10.1016/j.jinteco.2012.08.010.
- Jacks, David; Meissner, Christopher; Novy, Dennis (2008). "Trade Costs, 1870-2000". American Economic Review. 98 (2): 529–534. doi:10.1257/aer.98.2.529.
