= Greece–Luxembourg relations =

Bilateral relations between Greece and Luxembourg

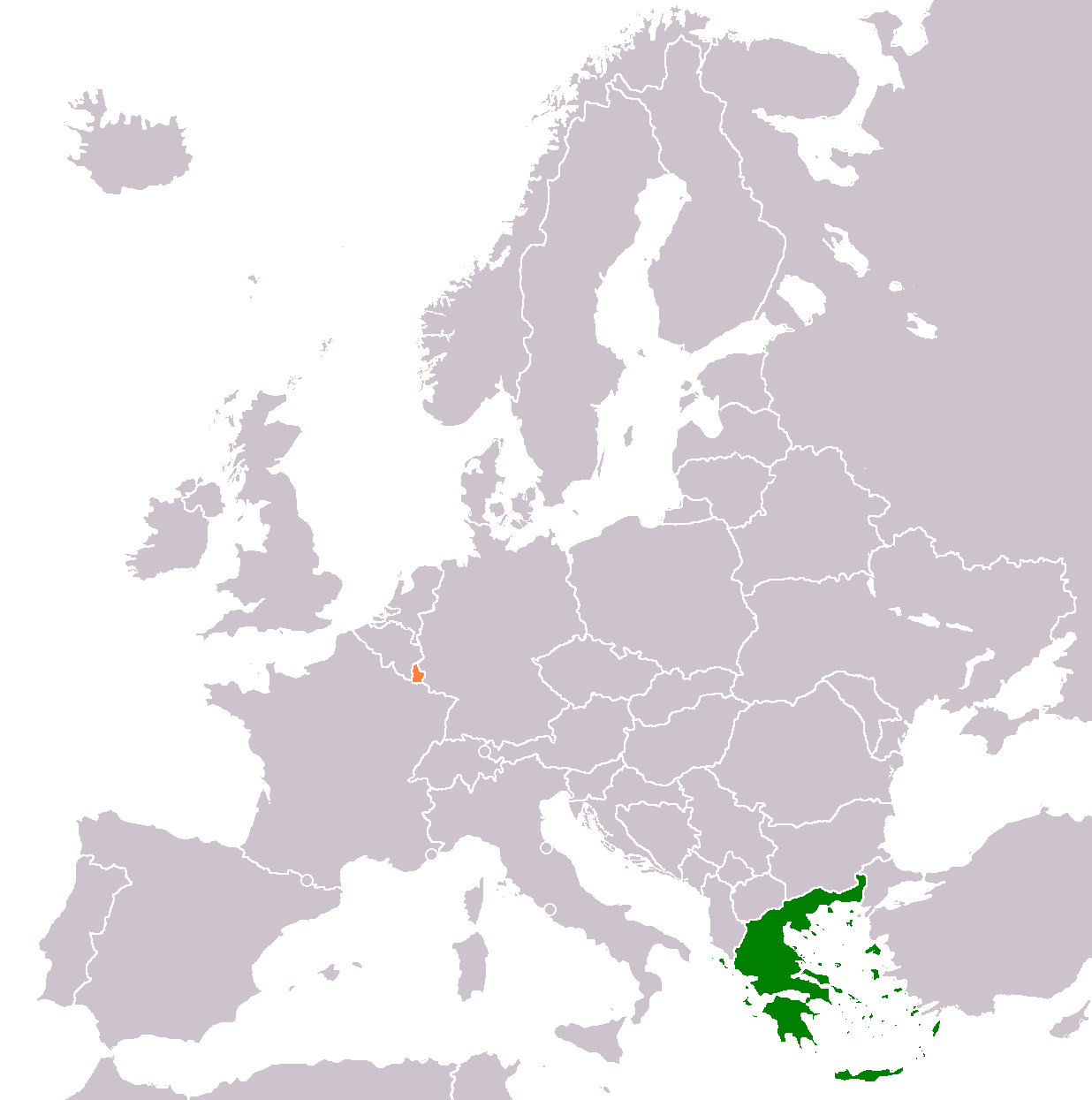

- Greece: Luxembourg

Diplomatic mission
- Embassy of Greece, Luxembourg City: Embassy of Luxembourg, Athens

Greece–Luxembourg relations or Greco–Luxembourg relations are the bilateral relations between The Hellenic Republic (Greece) and The Grand Duchy of Luxembourg (Luxembourg). Greece and Luxembourg have maintained friendly relations. They are both full members of the European Union and NATO, which heavily determines their relations. They have cooperated on multiple occasions, most notably passing a law preventing double taxation and a law sharing classified information.

Greece has an embassy in Luxembourg City on 27 rue Marie-Adelaide headed by Minister Angelos Ypsilantis with Christina Alexopoulou as an ambassador, a consular office in Luxembourg city headed by Attaché Ioannis Georgopoulos, and a public diplomacy office in Luxembourg City headed by Pavlos Pantsios.

Luxembourg has an embassy in Athens on Vasilissis Sofia Avenue opened in 1993 headed by Jean-Marc Reding with Elisabeth Cardoso as an ambassador and honorary consulates in Athens, Thessaloniki, and Heraklion. The embassy also represents Luxembourg in Romania and Cyprus as a non-resident embassy.

== History ==
=== Early modern period (1500s–1700s) ===
The history of Greece and Luxembourg were similar in many ways during the Early Modern Period as both countries were under the occupation of a foreign power for the entirety of this time period. Greece fell under the control of the Ottoman Empire completely at approximately 1500, but many parts of Greece were annexed by the Ottoman Empire in the 14th and 15th century. Constantinople (now Istanbul), the capital and largest city of the Byzantine Empire, was conquered by the Ottomans in 1453. Greece remained part of the Ottoman Empire until the Greek War of Independence (1821-1828).

The Ottoman Empire (1683)

At 1519, the House of Habsburg gained control of the Duchy of Luxembourg. When the House of Habsburg was divided between the Spanish Habsburgs and Austrian Habsburgs, The Duchy of Luxembourg, along with the Netherlands and Belgium, were given to the Spanish Habsburgs in 1555 and were collectively known as the Spanish Netherlands. In the peace agreements of the 30 Years' War (1648) the Duchy of Luxembourg lost lands to the Kingdom of France during the reign of the French King Louis XIV. The same year, the Treaty of Münster was signed, giving the Netherlands independence and by extension shrinking the size of the Spanish Netherlands to just Belgium and the Duchy of Luxembourg. After the War of Spanish Succession in 1714, Belgium and the Duchy of Luxembourg changed possession to the Austrian Habsburgs and were from then on collectively known as the Austrian Netherlands. During the Napoleonic era, the Duchy of Luxembourg was under the control of Napoleon Bonaparte who, in 1804, introduced the Napoleonic code to the Duchy of Luxembourg. After Napoleon was defeated in 1814 and 1815, the Congress of Vienna mandated that Luxembourg would become an independent state and elevated to the status of a Grand Duchy; however, the King of the Netherlands also became the Grand Duke of Luxembourg, meaning that in practice Luxembourg was a possession of the Netherlands. Prussia was also given large portions of northeast Luxembourg and the cities of Bitburg, Gerolstein and Daun and built a fortress in Luxembourg City.

=== The 19th century ===
During much of the 19th century Greece and the Grand Duchy of Luxembourg were trying to gain their independence from the foreign powers which had controlled them in the previous 300 years. The Greek War of Independence (1821-1828) against Ottoman rule was started by General Alexandros Ypsilantis's unsuccessful revolt in Moldavia (modern-day Romania) during the spring of 1821. Despite the revolt failing to achieve Moldavian autonomous rule, it led to widespread unrest in Greece, especially Morea (the Peloponnese).

In 1824, the Netherlands, and by extension Luxembourg, would establish contact with Greece. The relations were generally positive due to the Dutch Philhellenes within the Netherlands. Luxembourg joined Belgium in the Belgian Revolution of 1830 against the Netherlands. Belgium gained independence from the Netherlands in Treaty of London of 1839, which dictated that large portions of western Luxembourg being annexed into the new Belgian state, Luxembourg would remain under the control of the Netherlands with the King of the Netherlands being the Grand Duke of Luxembourg, and that Luxembourg would remain a part of the German Confederation. Under the rule of King William II of the Netherlands reforms were gradually enacted as he was in favor of Luxembourg's independence. He ratified Luxembourg's entry into the Zollverein which significantly helped Luxembourg's economy, created the administrative structures to help Luxembourg start to act as an independent state, helped Luxembourg create a national identity by teaching Luxembourgish in schools, and created a liberal constitution in 1848 which limited royal power. The Luxembourg Crisis, where Napoleon III of France tried to purchase Luxembourg in 1867, led to the withdrawing of Prussian forces from the grand Duchy of Luxembourg and the deconstruction of the Prussian fortress. After the death of King William III in 1890, the personal union between the Netherlands and Luxembourg was broken and by extension Luxembourg had completed its process of gaining independence; Luxembourg had finally gained complete autonomy.

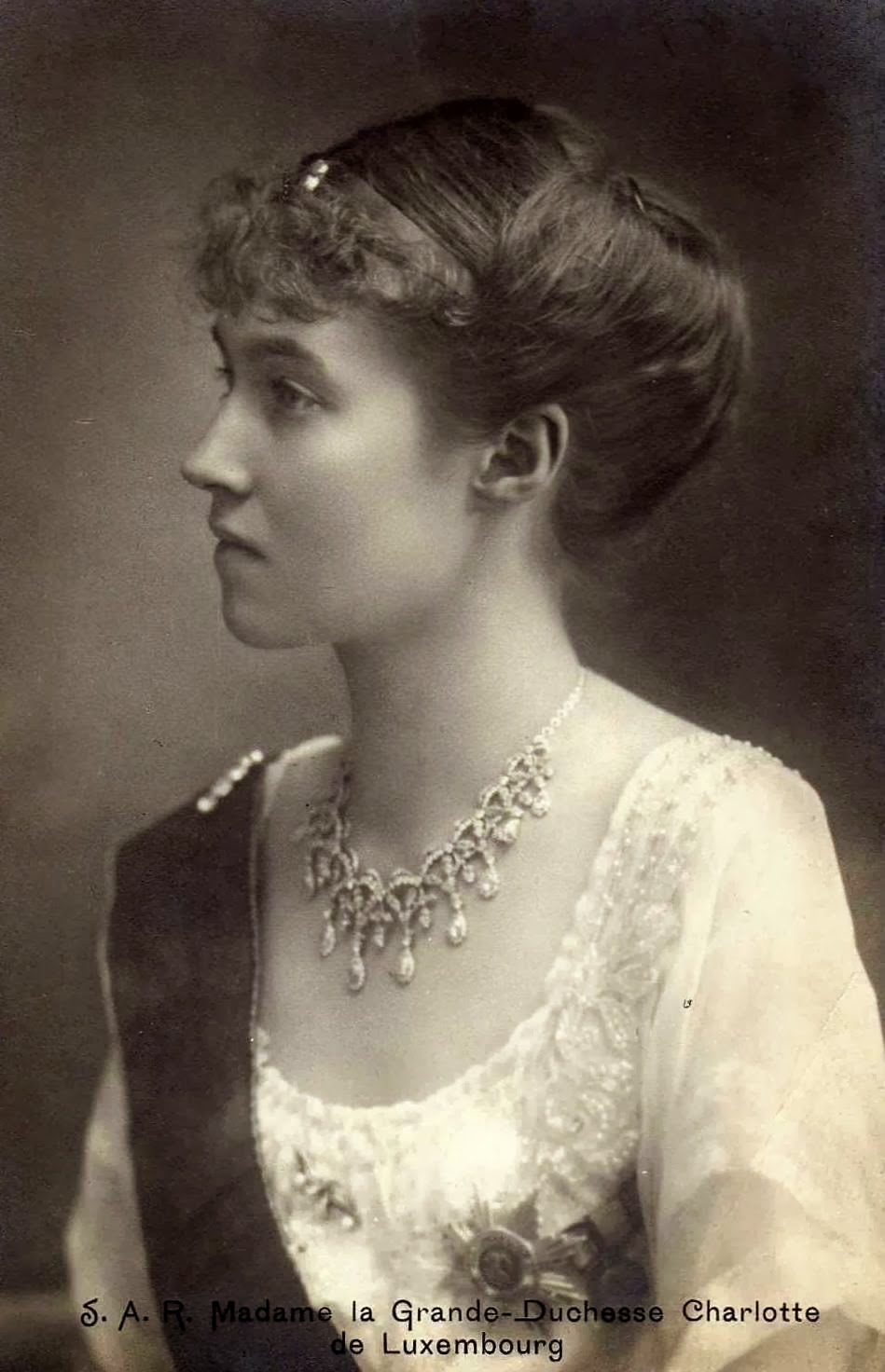
Grand Duchess Charlotte of Luxembourg (1919)

=== Modern era (1900s–now) ===
Luxembourg and Greece established relations on 13 December 1933 after Alexandros Zaimis wrote to Grand Duchess Charlotte of Luxembourg requesting Nikolaos Politis become the first ambassador of Greece to Luxembourg. Grand Duchess Charlotte accepted this request. 60 years later, on 16 June 1993, Luxembourg opened their resident embassy to Greece in Athens, with their first ambassador to Greece being Jean Dondelinger after an agreement was made between Grand Duke Jean and Konstantinos Karamanlis. Luxembourg’s embassy in Greece was originally located on Skoufa Street before being moved to Vasilissis Sofia Avenue in 2003.

== Commerce ==
In 2022, there was a total value of $306 million USD of trade between the two nations. Greece exported approximately $186 million USD (roughly €179.5 million Euros) of goods to Luxembourg, while Luxembourg exported approximately $120 million USD (roughly €115.8 million Euros) of goods to Greece, creating a trade deficit of $66 million USD (€63.7 million Euros) for Luxembourg. Greece’s largest exports to Luxembourg are petroleum gas (81.8%), electricity (6.64%), rolled tobacco (2.06%), and insulated wire (1.42%). Luxembourg’s largest exports to Greece are petroleum gas (33.2%), electricity (11.3%), plastic products (5.72%), and raw aluminum (5.36%).

In 2022, Greece exported $57.568 billion USD (€55.5 billion Euros) in total with $186 million (€179.5 million Euros) USD of goods going to Luxembourg, meaning that Greece's exports to Luxembourg accounted for 0.32% of Greece's total exports. In the same year, Greece imported $97.97 billion USD (€94.5 billion Euros) in total with $120 million USD (€115.8 million Euros) of goods coming from Luxembourg, meaning that Greece's imports from Luxembourg accounted for 0.12% of Greece's total imports.

In 2022, Luxembourg exported $16.77 billion USD (€16.2 billion Euros) with $120 million USD (€115.8 million Euros) of goods going to Greece, meaning that Luxembourg's exports to Greece accounted for 0.71% of Luxembourg's total exports. In the same year, Luxembourg imported $26.64 billion USD (€25.7 billion Euros) in total with $186 million USD (€179.5 million Euros) of goods coming from Greece, meaning that Luxembourg's imports from Greece accounted for 0.7% of Luxembourg's total imports.

== Resident diplomatic missions ==
- Greece has an embassy in Luxembourg City
- Luxembourg has an embassy in Athens and honorary consulates in Athens, Thessaloniki, and Heraklion

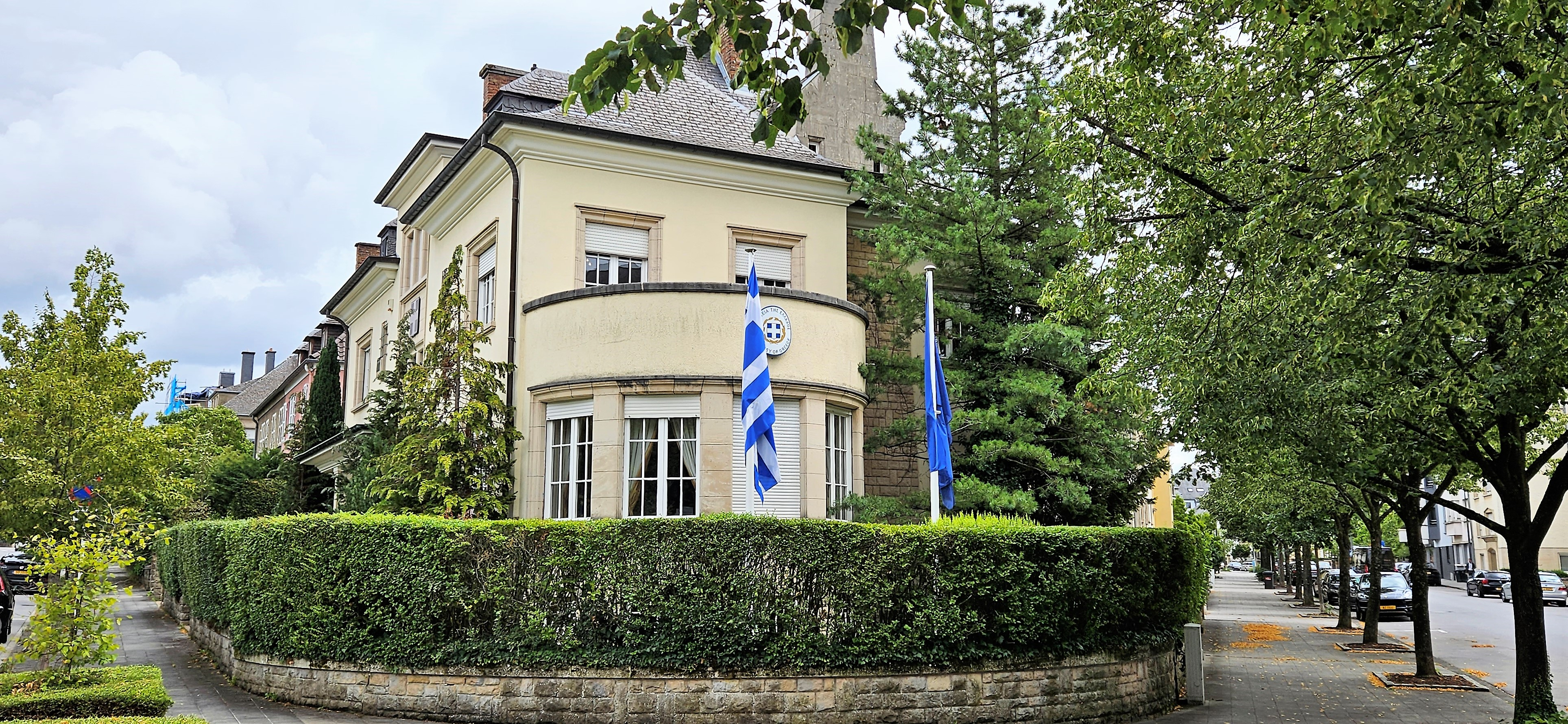
Embassy of Greece in Luxembourg City

== Bilateral agreements ==
- Agreement on Air Transport (signed in Luxembourg City, 22 October 1951)
- Agreement on Road Transport of passengers and goods (signed in Luxembourg City, 18 October 1984)
- Education agreement between Greece and Luxembourg (signed in Athens, 1990)
- Cultural agreement between Greece and Luxembourg (signed in Athens, 4 September 1990)
- Convention for the prevention of income and wealth Double Taxation and Evasion (signed in Athens, 22 November 1991)
- Agreement for the exchange and reciprocal protection of Classified Information (signed in Athens, 31 May 2006)

== State visits ==
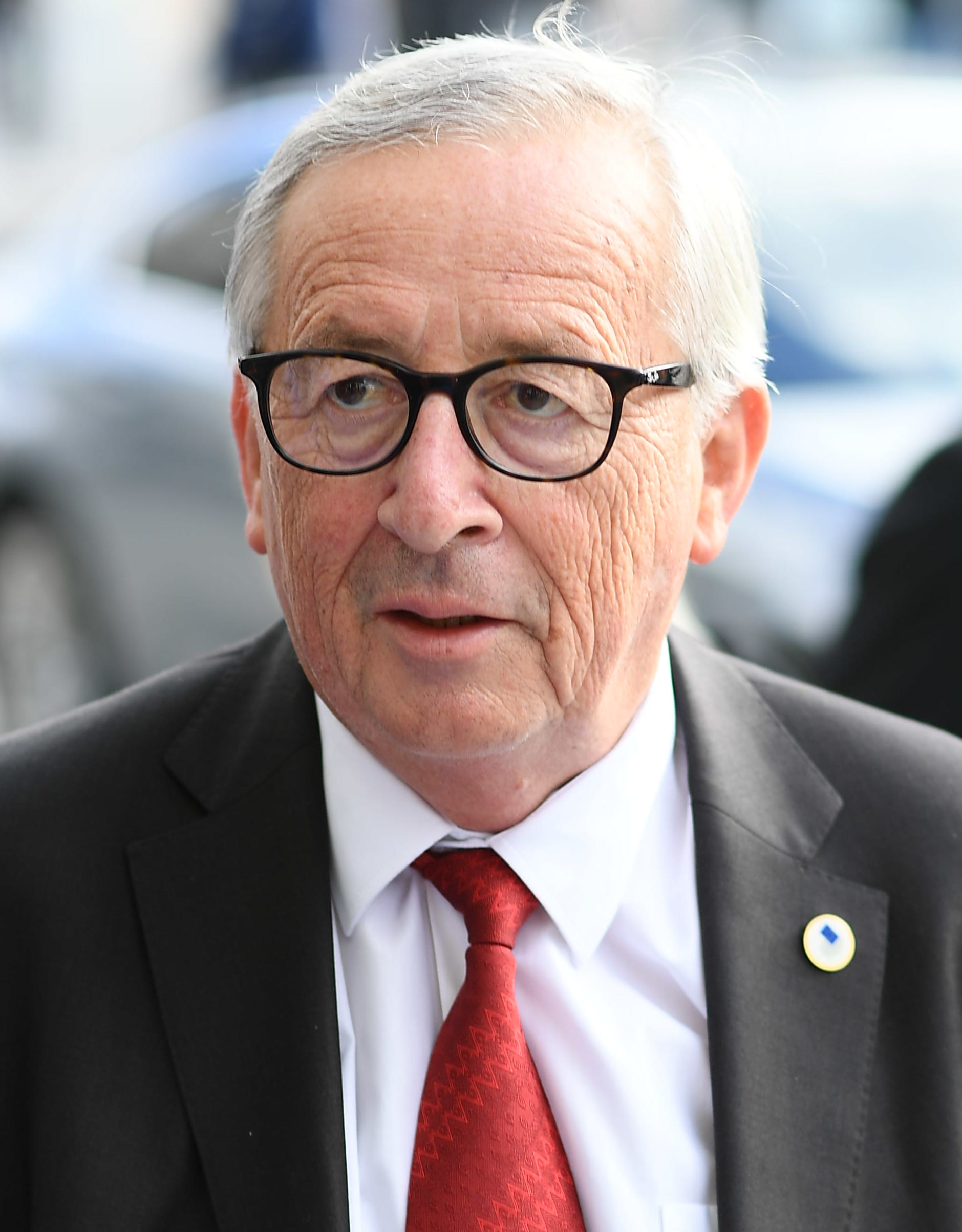
Jean-Claude Juncker (2019)

- The Greek President, Konstantinos Stephanopoulos, visited Luxembourg in 2001
- The Prime Minister of Luxembourg, Jean-Claude Juncker, visited Athens in 2002
- The Prime Minister of Luxembourg, Jean-Claude Juncker, visited Orestiada and Komotini in 2003
- The Grand Duke and Duchess of Luxembourg visited the Olympic and Paralympic Games in Athens in 2004
- The Prime Minister of Greece, Kostas Karamanlis, visited Luxembourg twice in the first half of 2005
- The Prime Minister of Luxembourg, Jean-Claude Juncker, and the Prime Minister of Greece, Kostas Karamanlis, held a meeting in Athens on 5 October 2005
- The Greek Minister of Finance, Georgios Alogoskoufis, and the Prime Minister of Luxembourg, Jean-Claude Juncker, held a meeting in Luxembourg City on 11 January 2006

== See also ==
- Foreign relations of Greece
- Foreign relations of Luxembourg
