= Graziella Bertocchi =

Italian economist

- Education: University of Pennsylvania
- Scientific career
- Thesis: Essays on the financial structure of a dynamic economy (1988)

Graziella Bertocchi is an Italian economist and Professor of Economics at the University of Modena and Reggio Emilia in Modena, Italy. She is known for her work on economic growth viewed from a historical perspective.

== Education and career ==
Bertocchi's undergraduate degree is from the University of Modena (1980). She earned an M.A. from the University of Pennsylvania in 1983, and went on to receive a Ph.D. from the University of Pennsylvania in 1988. She held an assistant professor position at Brown University, and then returned to the University of Modena and Reggio Emilia in 1993. She has been a full professor since 2000. She is the president of the Einaudi Institute for Economics and Finance in Rome, Italy.

== Academic work ==
Bertocchi has written on race, women in the economy and politics, as well as labor issues and the logic of enfranchisement. Her primary fields of study are macroeconomics, political economy, and family economic. Bertocchi's work on race has examined the link between slavery in the 1860s and present-day economic inequalities; this was covered by Pacific Standard. Bertocchi has also spoken on women and mathematics and the perceptions of mathematical ability in women. Her work on the impact of the COVID-19 pandemic on black women has been discussed in the media. She has also addressed the economic impact of the pandemic on Europe.

Bertocchi ranks highly in citations according to Research Papers in Economics; as of 2021, she is ranked in the top 5% of economics overall and has an h-index at Google Scholar of 24.

== Selected publications ==
- Bertocchi, Graziella; Canova, Fabio (2002-12-01). "Did colonization matter for growth?: An empirical exploration into the historical causes of Africa's underdevelopment". European Economic Review. 46 (10): 1851–1871. doi:10.1016/S0014-2921(01)00195-7. hdl:11380/305419. ISSN 0014-2921.
- Bertocchi, Graziella; Strozzi, Chiara (2008). "International migration and the role of institutions". Public Choice. 137 (1–2): 81–102. doi:10.1007/s11127-008-9314-x. hdl:11380/1292166. ISSN 0048-5829. S2CID 18574219.
- Bertocchi, Graziella; Spagat, Michael (2004-04-01). "The evolution of modern educational systems: Technical vs. general education, distributional conflict, and growth". Journal of Development Economics. 73 (2): 559–582. doi:10.1016/j.jdeveco.2003.05.003. hdl:11380/303824. ISSN 0304-3878.
- Bertocchi, Graziella; Brunetti, Marianna; Torricelli, Costanza (2011-11-01). "Marriage and other risky assets: A portfolio approach". Journal of Banking & Finance. 35 (11): 2902–2915. doi:10.1016/j.jbankfin.2011.03.019. hdl:11380/1292183. ISSN 0378-4266. S2CID 42888042.

== Honors and awards ==
Bertocchi was named a fellow of the Global Labor Organization in 2017. She is also a senior fellow of the Rimini Centre for Economic Analysis.
