= Francesco Lippi (economist) =

- Education: Bocconi University (Laurea); Tinbergen Institute / Erasmus University Rotterdam (PhD)
- Known for: Research on monetary shocks, sticky prices, and the demand for liquid assets
- Scientific career
- Fields: Macroeconomics; Monetary economics
- Institutions: Luiss University

Francesco Lippi is an Italian macroeconomist currently serving as a professor of economics at Luiss University in Rome. He is a Senior Fellow of the Einaudi Institute for Economics and Finance (EIEF) and since 2021 has served as the Editor-in-Chief of The Economic Journal. In 2024, Lippi was elected a Fellow of the Econometric Society.

== Early life and education ==
Lippi studied economics at Bocconi University in Milan, where he received a Laurea degree with highest honors. He later completed a PhD in economics at the Tinbergen Institute of Erasmus University Rotterdam in 1997.

== Career ==
Lippi began his professional career at the Bank of Italy, joining its research department in 1996. He later served as head of the Monetary Analysis Unit from 2003 to 2006.

In 2006 he joined the University of Sassari as professor of economics, where he remained until 2018. He subsequently joined Luiss University as professor of economics.

Lippi has also held visiting and research positions at several institutions, including the Hoover Institution at Stanford University. He is a research fellow of the Centre for Economic Policy Research (CEPR) and a senior fellow of the Einaudi Institute for Economics and Finance (EIEF).

In 2019 he became joint managing editor of The Economic Journal, and in August 2021 he was appointed editor-in-chief of the journal.

== Honors and awards ==
Lippi was awarded European Research Council (ERC) Advanced Grants in 2013 and 2021. He received the Luiss Teaching Excellence Award for the 2019–2020 academic year. In 2024, he was elected a Fellow of the Econometric Society. He was awarded the Premio De Sanctis for Economic Science in 2025.

== Selected publications ==
- Lippi, Francesco (2003). "Strategic Monetary Policy with Non-Atomistic Wage Setters". Review of Economic Studies. 70 (4): 909–919.
- Fuchs, William; Lippi, Francesco (2006). "Monetary Union with Voluntary Participation". Review of Economic Studies. 73: 437–457.
- Alvarez, Fernando; Lippi, Francesco (2009). "Financial innovation and the transactions demand for cash". Econometrica. 77 (2): 363–402.
- Alvarez, Fernando; Le Bihan, Hervé; Lippi, Francesco (2016). "The real effects of monetary shocks in sticky price models: a sufficient statistic approach". American Economic Review. 106 (10): 2817–2851.
- Alvarez, Fernando; Lippi, Francesco (2022). "The analytic theory of monetary shocks". Econometrica. 90 (4): 1655–1680.
- Alvarez, Fernando; Lippi, Francesco; Oskolkov, Aleksei (2022). "The Macroeconomics of Sticky Prices with Generalized Hazard Functions". The Quarterly Journal of Economics. 137 (2): 989–1038.
- Alvarez, Fernando; Lippi, Francesco; Souganidis, Panagiotis (2023). "Price Setting with Strategic Complementarities as a Mean Field Game". Econometrica. 91 (6): 2005–2039.
- Cavallo, Alberto; Lippi, Francesco; Miyahara, Ken (2024). "Large shocks travel fast". American Economic Review: Insights. 6 (4): 558–574.
