= Nikos Christodoulakis =

Greek politician, professor and electronics engineer

Nikos Christodoulakis Νίκος Χριστοδουλάκης
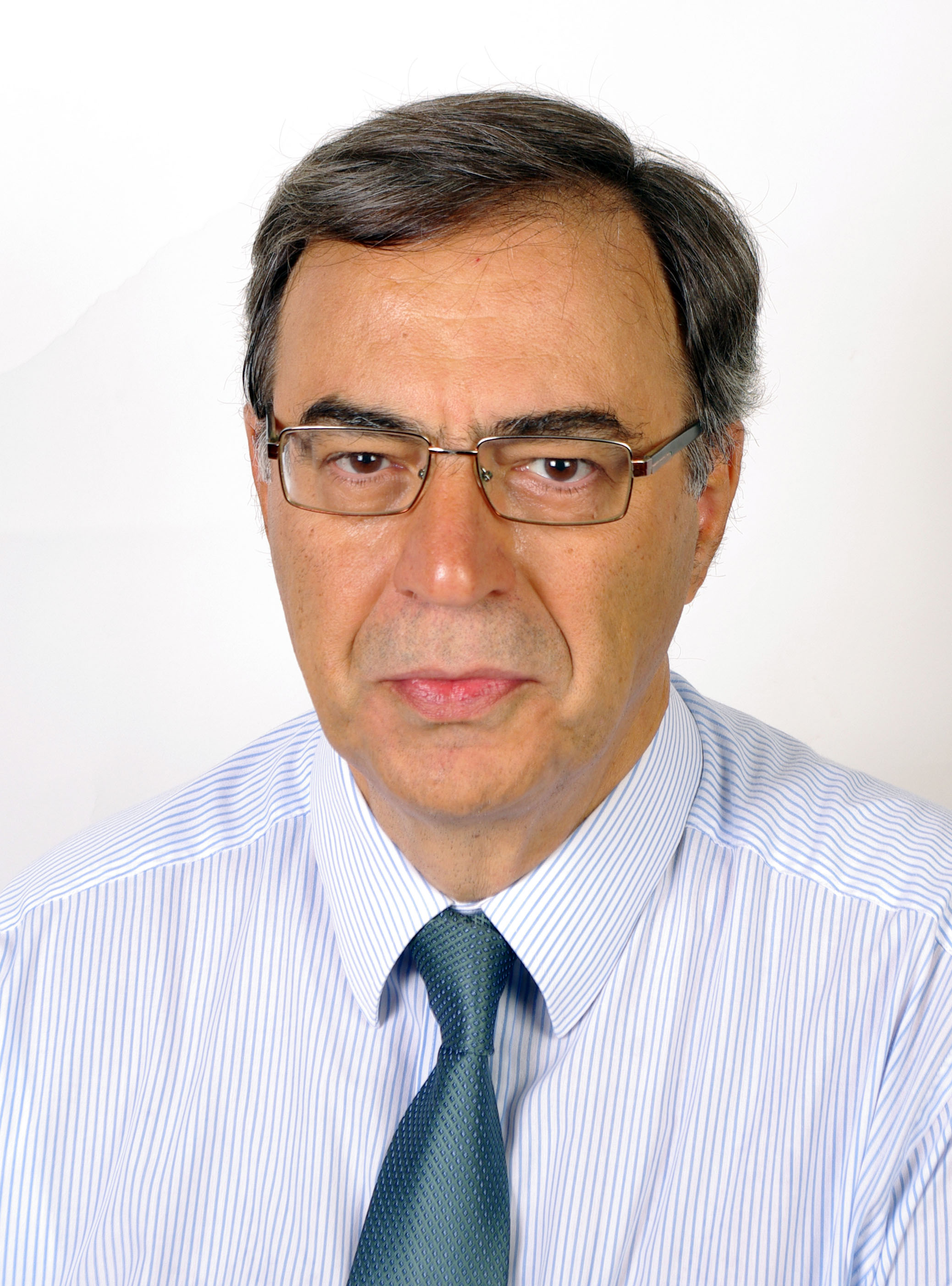

Minister of the Economy, Infrastructure, Shipping and Tourism
- In office 28 August 2015 – 21 September 2015
- Prime Minister: Vassiliki Thanou
- Preceded by: Giorgos Stathakis
- Succeeded by: Giorgos Stathakis (Economy, Development and Tourism)

Minister of the Economy and Finance
- In office 24 October 2001 – 10 March 2004
- Prime Minister: Costas Simitis
- Preceded by: Yiannos Papantoniou
- Succeeded by: Georgios Alogoskoufis

Minister of Development
- In office 13 April 2000 – 24 October 2001
- Prime Minister: Costas Simitis
- Preceded by: Evangelos Venizelos
- Succeeded by: Akis Tsochatzopoulos

Personal details
- Born: 1952 (age 73–74) Armenoi, Greece
- Party: Panhellenic Socialist Movement
- Education: National Technical University of Athens; Darwin College, Cambridge

Nikos Christodoulakis (Greek: Νίκος Χριστοδουλάκης) (born 1952) is a Greek politician, economics professor and electronics engineer. He was the Minister for Economy and Finance of Greece from 2001 to 2004.

== Early life and education ==
Born in Chania, Crete, Nicos Christodoulakis attended high school in Zografou, Athens. In 1970, he received the First Award in the competition by the Hellenic Mathematical Society. He studied in the Faculty of Electrical Engineering at the National Technical University of Athens, and graduated in 1975. During his studies, he actively participated in the resistance movement against the military dictatorship that culminated in the Athens Polytechnic uprising in November 1973. After the fall of the dictatorship, he was elected chairman of the Students’ Association of the Faculty (1974-1975). In 1976, he testified at the Athens Martial Court against the junta leaders charged with the violent suppression of the Polytechnic occupation in 1973. In 1977-1979, he completed his military service in the Engineers Corps. During 1974-1980, he worked as a consultant engineer in construction and manufacturing companies, and as adjunct professor in the Technological Institutions (TEI) in Kozani and Athens. Receiving a scholarship from the State Scholarship Foundation (IKY) and the British Council, he attended postgraduate studies at the University of Cambridge (1980-1984), obtaining an MPhil in Control Systems Theory and a PhD on policy design under uncertainty. Member of the Darwin College, Cambridge.

== Academic career ==
Over the following years he worked as a consultant engineer in some companies (1974–1980) he became a teaching professor at the Technological Educational Institutes (TEI) in Greece (1977–1980), a Senior Research Officer at the University of Cambridge (1984–1986), an assistant professor at the Athens University of Economics (1986–1989), a Fellow at the European University Institute in Florence (1989–1990), a visiting professor at the University of Cyprus (1996), a visiting professor at the Charles University in Prague (1992–1993) and the Vice-Rector of the Athens University of Economics and Business (1992–1994), where he's also a teacher since 1990 up to present, currently teaching at the Department of International & European Economic Studies of the university. He was also a researcher in the Tinbergen Institute, the London School of Economics and the Centre for Economic Policy Research, and has also published many economy-related academic books and articles over the last three decades.

== Political career ==
His political career began in 1993, when he became a Secretary General for Research and Technology for three years until 1996, when he was appointed an Economic advisor to the Prime Minister. From 1999 to 2007 he was elected as a member of the Greek Parliament with the Socialist Party of Greece (PASOK). He was the Deputy Minister of Finance for four years (1996–2000), the Minister for Development for one year (2000–2001) and, in 2001, he became the Minister for Economy and Finance of Greece for three years, up to 2004. Furthermore, he was the Chairman of the Eurogroup from June 2002 to July 2003, participating in international meetings with G7, the World Bank and International Monetary Fund, and the Chairman of the Economic and Financial Affairs Council (ECOFIN) in the European Union, during the Greek presidency (January–June 2003).

Political offices
| Preceded by Evangelos Venizelos | Minister of Development; 2004–2009 | Succeeded by Akis Tsochatzopoulos |
| Preceded by Yiannos Papantoniou | Minister of the Economy and Finance; 2001–2004 | Succeeded by Georgios Alogoskoufis |
| Preceded by Giorgos Stathakis | Minister of the Economy, Infrastructure, Shipping and Tourism; 2015 | Succeeded by Giorgos Stathakis as Minister of the Economy, Development and Tourism |
