= Georgios Alogoskoufis =

Greek academic and politician

Georgios Alogoskoufis Γιώργος Αλογοσκούφης
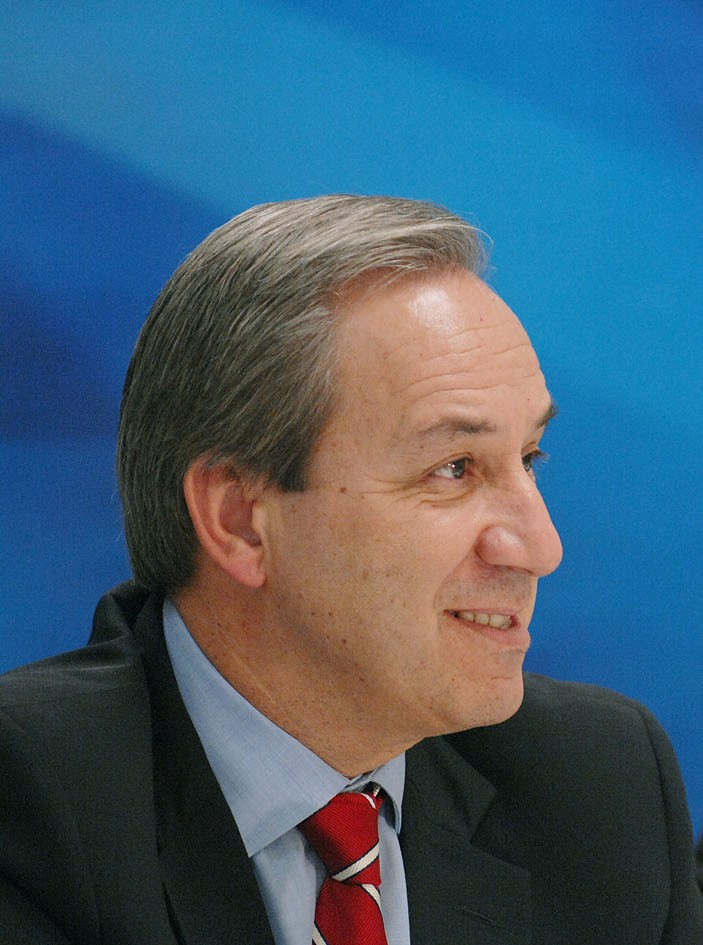

Minister of the Economy and Finance
- In office 10 March 2004 – 8 January 2009
- Prime Minister: Kostas Karamanlis
- Preceded by: Nikos Christodoulakis
- Succeeded by: Yannis Papathanasiou

Personal details
- Born: 17 October 1955 (age 70) Athens, Greece
- Party: New Democracy
- Spouse: Dika Agapitidou
- Education: University of Athens; London School of Economics
- Website: alogoskoufisg.org

Georgios Alogoskoufis (Greek: Γιώργος Αλογοσκούφης) (born 17 October 1955) is a professor of economics at the Athens University of Economics and Business since 1990. He was a member of the Hellenic Parliament from September 1996 till October 2009 and served as Greece's Minister of Economy and Finance from March 2004 till January 2009.

== Background, academic and political career ==
George Alogoskoufis was born in Athens on 17 October 1955.

== The economic policy mix applied under the leadership of Alogoskoufis ==
In the period in which Alogoskoufis served as the minister for Economy and Finance, he actuated a series of economic structural reforms and fiscal adjustment to contain budget deficits, which, although unpopular, have failed to slash Greece's high 2004 budget deficit (from 5.7% in 2003 to 9.8% in 2008). In the same period of time, Greece's gross domestic product has grown by one of the highest growth rates in the Eurozone. Unemployment also fell significantly.

During 2004–2007, marginal corporate and personal income taxes were reduced. He worked extensively with the private sector and sold over euro 6 billion of government holdings. However, these reforms did not prove sufficient to avert Greece external debt crisis in 2010.

== Criticism ==
George Alogoskoufis has been accused of falsifying Greece's economical data during his tenure, an exercise referred to as "Greek Statistics", which led to the county's bankruptcy in 2010.

George Alogoskoufis was pelted with eggs by Greek left wing activists at a meeting held at the London School of Economics on 14 November 2008. The activists threw the eggs as a protest against the Greek government.

== Publications ==
Alogoskoufis is the author of seven books and has published widely in macroeconomics, international monetary economics and public economics.

Over 40 papers have been published in some of the most prestigious international academic journals including the American Economic Review, the Journal of Political Economy, the Journal of Monetary Economics, the European Economic Review, Economica, the Journal of the Japanese and International Economies, Economic Journal and the Economic Policy. His research focuses on unemployment, inflation, exchange rates, economic growth and monetary and fiscal policy.

He has given invited lectures in some of the most prestigious universities in Europe, the US and Japan and has presented papers in a number of academic conferences worldwide.

== Books ==
- "External Constraints on Macroeconomic Policy: The European Experience" (with Lucas Papademos and Richard Portes), Centre for Economic Policy Research, 1991.
- "The crisis of economic policy", Kritiki, Athens, 1994 (in Greek).
- "Unemployment: Choices for Europe, Monitoring European Integration 5" (with Charles Bean, Giuseppe Bertola, Daniel Cohen, Juan Dolado, Gilles Saint-Paul), Centre for Economic Policy Research, 1995.
- "The Drachma: From the Phoenix to the Euro" (with Sophia Lazaretou), Livanis, Athens, 2002 (in Greek).
- "Greece after the crisis", Kastaniotis, Athens, 2009 (in Greek).
- "International Economics and the World Economy", Gutenberg, Athens 2013 (in Greek)
- "Dynamic Macroeconomics", MIT Press, Cambridge Mass. 2019

== Publications in academic journals ==
The following is a selected list of journal articles by Alogoskoufis.

- Alogoskoufis, George S. (1982). "Unanticipated money, output and prices in Greece". European Economic Review. 19 (2): 289–303. doi:10.1016/S0014-2921(82)80056-1. Pdf.
- Alogoskoufis, George S. (1983). "The labour market in an equilibrium business cycle model". Journal of Monetary Economics. 11 (1): 117–128. doi:10.1016/0304-3932(83)90017-X. Pdf.
- Alogoskoufis, George S.; Pissarides, Christopher A. (September 1983). "A test of price sluggishness in the simple rational expectations model: U.K. 1950-1980". The Economic Journal. 93 (371): 616–628. doi:10.2307/2232398. JSTOR 2232398. Pdf.
- Alogoskoufis, George S. (1985). "Macroeconomic policy and aggregate fluctuations in a semi-industrialized open economy: Greece 1951–1980". European Economic Review. 29 (1): 35–61. doi:10.1016/0014-2921(85)90037-6. Pdf.
- Alogoskoufis, George S. (June 1987). "Aggregate employment and intertemporal substitution in the UK". The Economic Journal. 97 (386): 403–415. doi:10.2307/2232886. JSTOR 2232886. Pdf.
- Alogoskoufis, George S. (October 1987). "On intertemporal substitution and aggregate labor supply". Journal of Political Economy. 95 (5): 938–960. doi:10.1086/261497. JSTOR 1833124. S2CID 153748991. Pdf.
- Alogoskoufis, George S.; Manning, Alan (March 1988). "Wage setting and unemployment persistence in Europe, Japan and the USA". European Economic Review. 32 (2–3): 698–706. doi:10.1016/0014-2921(88)90218-8. Pdf.
- Alogoskoufis, George S.; Manning, Alan; Calmfors, Lars; Danthine, Jean-Pierre (October 1988). "On the persistence of unemployment". Economic Policy. 3 (7): 427–469. doi:10.2307/1344492. JSTOR 1344492. Pdf.
- Alogoskoufis, George S. (April 1989). "Monetary, nominal income and exchange rate targets in a small open economy". European Economic Review. 33 (4): 687–705. doi:10.1016/0014-2921(89)90020-2. Pdf.
- Alogoskoufis, George S. (February 1990). "Monetary policy and the informational implications of the Phillips Curve". Economica. 57 (225): 107–117. doi:10.2307/2554084. JSTOR 2554084. Pdf.
- Alogoskoufis, George S. (March 1990). "Traded goods, competitiveness and aggregate fluctuations in the United Kingdom". The Economic Journal. 100 (399): 141–163. doi:10.2307/2233599. JSTOR 2233599. Pdf.
- Alogoskoufis, George S.; Manning, Alan (January 1991). "Tests of alternative wage employment bargaining models with an application to the UK aggregate labour market". European Economic Review. 35 (1): 23–37. doi:10.1016/0014-2921(91)90101-N. Pdf.
- Alogoskoufis, George S. (May 1991). "Reviewed Works: Keynes' Economics: Methodological Issues by Tony Lawson, Hashem Pesaran; Kaldor's Political Economy by Tony Lawson, J. Gabriel Palma, John Sender". Economica. 58 (230): 264–266. doi:10.2307/2554658. JSTOR 2554658. Pdf.
- Alogoskoufis, George S. (May 1991). "Reviewed Work: Limiting Exchange Rate Flexibility: The European Monetary System by F. Giavazzi, A. Giovannini". Economica. 58 (230): 261–263. doi:10.2307/2554656. JSTOR 2554656. Pdf.
- Alogoskoufis, George S.; Smith, Ron (December 1991). "The Phillips Curve, the persistence of inflation, and the Lucas Critique: evidence from exchange-rate regimes". The American Economic Review. 81 (5). American Economic Association: 1254–1275. JSTOR 2006916. Pdf.
- Alogoskoufis, George S.; van der Ploeg, Frederick (December 1991). "On budgetary policies, growth, and external deficits in an interdependent world". Journal of the Japanese and International Economies. 5 (4): 305–324. doi:10.1016/0889-1583(91)90002-8. S2CID 154317537.
- Alogoskoufis, George S. (May 1992). "Monetary accommodation, exchange rate regimes and inflation persistence". The Economic Journal. 102 (412): 461–480. doi:10.2307/2234285. JSTOR 2234285. Pdf.
- Alogoskoufis, George S.; Philippopoulos, Apostolis (October 1992). "Inflationary expectations, political parties and the exchange rate regime: Greece 1958–1989". European Journal of Political Economy. 8 (3): 375–399. doi:10.1016/0176-2680(92)90002-X. Pdf.
- Alogoskoufis, George S.; Lockwood, Ben; Philippopoulos, Apostolis (November 1992). "Wage inflation, electoral uncertainty and the exchange rate regime: theory and UK evidence". The Economic Journal. 102 (415): 1370–1394. doi:10.2307/2234795. JSTOR 2234795. Pdf.
- Alogoskoufis, George S. (1994), "On inflation, unemployment and the optimal exchange rate regime", in van der Ploeg, Frederick (ed.), The handbook of international macroeconomics, Oxford, UK Cambridge, Massachusetts, USA: Blackwell, ISBN 978-0-631-19062-2.
- Alogoskoufis, George S.; Helpman, Elhanan; Leiderman, Leonardo; Bufman, Gil; Grilli, Vittorio (October 1994). "A new breed of exchange rate bands: Chile, Israel and Mexico". Economic Policy. 9 (19): 259–306. doi:10.2307/1344497. JSTOR 1344497. Pdf.
- Alogoskoufis, George S.; van der Ploeg, Frederick (November 1994). "Money and endogenous growth". Journal of Money, Credit and Banking. 26 (4): 771–791. doi:10.2307/2077946. JSTOR 2077946. Pdf.
- Alogoskoufis, George S.; Giavazzi, Francesco; Laroque, Guy (April 1995). "The two faces of Janus: institutions, policy regimes and macroeconomic performance in Greece". Economic Policy. 10 (20): 147–192. doi:10.2307/1344540. JSTOR 1344540. Pdf.

== Awards and honorary distinctions ==
His PhD thesis was awarded the R. S. Sayers Prize of the London University for 1981. His book, "The Drachma: From the Phoenix to the Euro", was awarded the prize of the Academy of Athens in 2002.

Political offices
Preceded by Nikos Christodoulakis	Minister of the Economy and Finance; 2004–2009	Succeeded by Yannis Papathanasiou
