= Michael Jansson =

Danish economist

- Born: November 5, 1971 (age 54)
- Occupations: Economist, professor

Academic background
- Education: B.A. (1996), M.A. (1998), Ph.D. (2000), Aarhus University

Academic work
- Discipline: Econometrics
- Institutions: University of California, Berkeley

Michael Jansson is an economist and the Edward G. and Nancy S. Jordan Family professor at the University of California, Berkeley.

== Early life ==
Jansson was born in Viborg, Denmark in 1971. He attended high school at the Viborg Katedralskole.

Jansson attended Aarhus University as an economics major starting from 1992. He received his B.A. in Economics in 1996. He completed his M.A. in 1998, but continued to stay at Aarhus University for his Ph.D. He finished his Ph.D. in 2000.

== Career ==
Jansson chose to accept a job offer from the University of California, Berkeley in 2000 where he became a research economist. In 2001, he became an assistant professor. He became an associate professor in 2007 and a professor in 2013.

Jansson is an associate editor with Econometrica and a co-editor of Econometric Theory and The Econometrics Journal. Jansson became the co-editor of the Journal of Econometrics in 2023.

== Awards ==
Jansson won a Sloan Research Fellowship in 2007. Jansson was a Fulbright Scholar from 1996 to 1997. He received an Econometric Theory Multa Scripsit Award in 2005. In 2023, he became a Fellow of the Econometric Society.

== Personal life ==
Jansson has a wife and two children.
