= Ox (programming language) =

Object-oriented programming language

- Developer(s): OxMetrics Technologies
- Stable release: 9.30 / August 2024
- Operating system: Windows, Mac OS X, Linux
- Type: programming language, econometric software
- License: proprietary (console version free for academic use)
- Website: www.doornik.com

Ox is an object-oriented matrix programming language with a mathematical and statistical function library, developed by Jurgen Doornik. It has been designed for econometric programming. It is available for Windows, Mac OS X and Linux platforms.

The downloadable console version of Ox is free for academic use. A commercial version is available for non-academic use. According to its documentation, it should be cited whenever results are published.

The programming environment for econometric modelling OxMetrics is based on Ox. The environment also includes packages such as: PcGive, Autometrics, G@rch, Mulcom, and Ssfpack.

== See also ==
- R (programming language)
