= Economic statistics =

Topic in applied statistics

Economic statistics is a topic in applied statistics and applied economics that concerns the collection, processing, compilation, dissemination, and analysis of economic data. It is closely related to business statistics and econometrics. It is also common to call the data themselves "economic statistics", but for this usage, "economic data" is the more common term.

== Overview ==
The data of concern to economic statistics may include those of an economy within a region, country, or group of countries. Economic statistics may also refer to a subtopic of official statistics for data produced by official organizations (e.g. national statistical services, intergovernmental organizations such as United Nations, European Union or OECD, central banks, and ministries).

Analyses within economic statistics both make use of and provide the empirical data needed in economic research, whether descriptive or econometric. They are a key input for decision making as to economic policy. The subject includes statistical analysis of topics and problems in microeconomics, macroeconomics, business, finance, forecasting, data quality, and policy evaluation. It also includes such considerations as what data to collect in order to quantify some particular aspect of an economy and of how best to collect in any given instance.

== See also ==
- Business statistics
- Econometrics
- Survey of production

== Journals ==
- Journal of Business and Economic Statistics
- Review of Economics and Statistics (from Review of Economic Statistics, 1919–47)
