= Jennifer L. Castle =

British economist

- Born: 11 September 1979 (age 47)
- Citizenship: United Kingdom

Academic background
- Education: Durham University (BA); Nuffield College, Oxford (MPhil, DPhil)
- Website: users.ox.ac.uk/~nuff0231/

Jennifer Louise Castle (born 11 September 1979) is a British economist. She is a Tutorial Fellow in Economics at Magdalen College, Oxford, and serves as the Director of Climate Econometrics at Nuffield College, Oxford.

Castle graduated with a first-class degree in Economics from Durham University in 2001. She completed an MPhil (2003) and DPhil (2006) at the University of Oxford. Her research interests lie in climate econometrics, model selection and forecasting.

In 2019, she published Forecasting: An Essential Introduction with co-authors David F. Hendry and Michael P. Clements.

She later collaborated with Hendry on a 2024 paper in Renewable Energy that proposed five 'sensitive information points' to deliver Net Zero by 2050, including the establishment of more vertical and underground farms in inner cities.

== Selected publications ==
=== Books ===
- Castle, Jennifer L. (2008). Econometric Model Selection: Nonlinear Techniques and Forecasting. VDM Verlag. ISBN 978-3-639-00458-8.
- Castle, Jennifer L.; Hendry, David F. (2019). Modelling Our Changing World. Palgrave Macmillan. ISBN 978-3-030-21431-9.
- Hendry, David F.; Castle, Jennifer L.; Clements, Michael P. (2019). Forecasting: An Essential Introduction. Yale University Press. ISBN 9780300244663.

=== Journal articles ===
- Castle, Jennifer L.; Doornik, Jurgen A.; Hendry, David F. (2011). "Evaluating Automatic Model Selection". Journal of Time Series Econometrics. 3 (1). doi:10.2202/1941-1928.1097.
- Castle, Jennifer L.; Doornik, Jurgen A.; Hendry, David F. (2012). "Model selection when there are multiple breaks". Journal of Econometrics. 169 (2): 239–246. doi:10.1016/j.jeconom.2012.01.026.
- Castle, Jennifer L.; Hendry, David F. (2023). "Can the UK Achieve Net Zero Greenhouse Gas Emissions by 2050?". National Institute Economic Review. 266: 11–21. doi:10.1017/nie.2024.6.
- Castle, Jennifer L.; Hendry, David F. (2024). "Five sensitive intervention points to achieve climate neutrality by 2050, illustrated by the UK". Renewable Energy. 226. doi:10.1016/j.renene.2024.120445.
