= Yiannos Papantoniou =

Greek politician

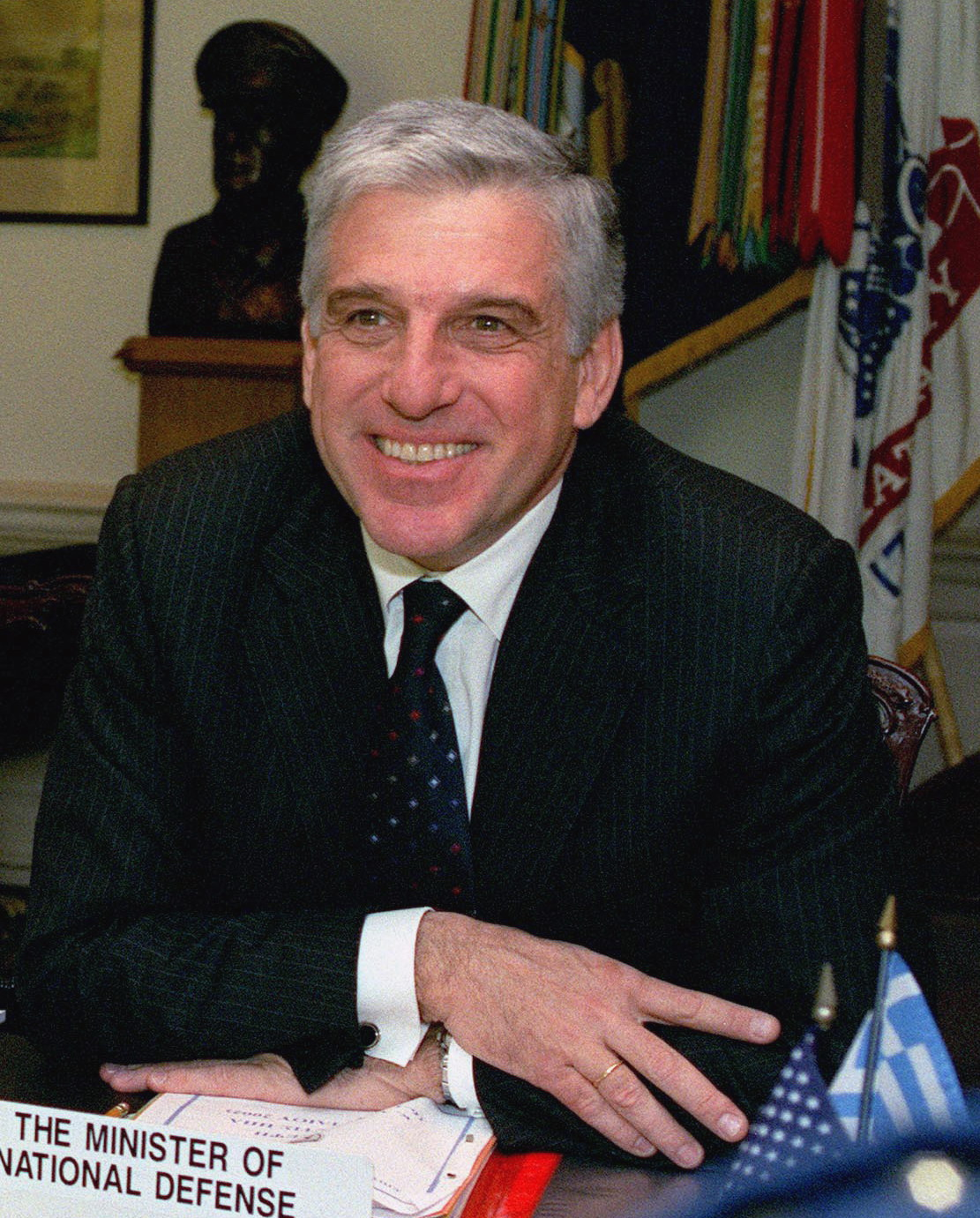
- Yiannos Papantoniou in 2002.

Member of the Hellenic Parliament
- In office 1989–2007

Member of the European Parliament
- In office 1981–1984

Personal details
- Born: 27 July 1949 (age 77) Paris, France
- Party: PASOK
- Education: Queens' College, Cambridge; University of Athens
- Occupation: Economist

Yiannos Papantoniou (Greek: Γιάννος Παπαντωνίου; born 27 July 1949) is a former member of the National Parliament in Greece (MP) from 1988 to 2007, Minister of National Defense (2001−03), Minister of Economy and Finance (1994−2001). During his time as Economy and Finance Minister, he worked closely with his Economic and Financial Affairs Council partners to prepare for the launch of the Euro in Greece. For his achievements he was 'highly commended' by Euromoney magazine in September 1998 as Finance Minister of the Year. Prior to this, Papantoniou worked at the OECD (1978–81), served as a Member of the European Parliament (MEP) from 1981 to 1984, and as advisor to the Greek prime minister on EEC Affairs and Integration. He was elected as chairman of the board of governors of the European Bank for Reconstruction and Development (EBRD) in 1999. From 2009 to 2010, he was visiting senior fellow in the Hellenic Observatory within the European Institute at the London School of Economics and Political Science. Papantoniou has published numerous articles and books on topics related to economic and political developments in Greece, Europe and the wider world scene. In November 2014, Papantoniou was convicted by an Athens court of failing to declare 1.2 million euros in a Swiss bank account held under his wife's name. In July 2017, he filed an appeal to the European court of human rights against this decision.

He is currently the president of the Centre for Progressive Policy Research (KEPP), an independent think-tank.

On 24 October 2018, upon decision of the prosecuting authorities, Papantoniou and his wife were detained and sent to Korydallos prison, pending their trial for grave corruption and money-laundering charges, the losses for the Greek State being estimated at 400 million Euro.

On 7 April 2020 Yannos Papantoniou was released from temporary detention upon decision of a Judicial Council that stated that insufficient evidence was provided for sending the case to trial and ordered the investigating authorities to search for supplementary evidence through seeking further depositions. A trial was held by the Athens Appeals Court on 15 January 2025 in order to consider the charges. On 20 September 2025 the three-member Appeals Court unanimously acquitted Yannos Papantoniouand his wife Stavroula Kourakou, as well as another co-defendant (Andreas Bardis), of all charges.

== See also ==
- List of national economy ministers
- List of ministers of finance
- List of economy and finance ministers

== Notes and references ==
Government offices
Preceded by	Minister for Finance; 1994–2001	Succeeded by Nikos Christodoulakis
Preceded by	Minister for National Economy; 1994–2001	Succeeded by Nikos Christodoulakis
Preceded by Akis Tsochatzopoulos	Minister for National Defence; 2001–2004	Succeeded by Spilios Spiliotopoulos
