= Søren Johansen =

Danish Statistician and Econometrician (born 1939)

- Born: 6 November 1939 (age 86); Denmark

Academic background
- Education: University of Copenhagen
- Influences: David F. Hendry, Clive Granger

Academic work
- Discipline: Statistics; Econometrics
- Institutions: University of Copenhagen; European University Institute
- Doctoral students: Søren Asmussen; Pieter Omtzigt
- Notable ideas: Cointegration; Embedding problem Fractional cointegration Indicator Saturation
- Website: Information at IDEAS / RePEc

Søren Johansen (born 6 November 1939) is a Danish statistician and econometrician who is known for his contributions to the theory of cointegration. He is currently a professor at the Department of Economics, University of Copenhagen and in the Center for Research in Econometric Analysis of Time Series (CREATES) of the Aarhus University. He has previously held positions at the Department of Statistics, University of Copenhagen, and the European University Institute in Florence.

== Biography ==
=== Early life ===
Johansen was born on 6 November 1939 in Denmark.

=== Academic life ===
Johansen graduated from the University of Copenhagen in mathematical statistics. He began his academic career at the University of Copenhagen, Institute of Mathematical Statistics in 1964 and was promoted to full professor in 1989. In 1967, he obtained the Gold medal from University of Copenhagen for the thesis "An application of extreme points methods in probability" and in 1974, he became dr. phil. with the thesis "The embedding problem for Markov chains".

Johansen visited UCSD where he interacted with Robert Engle and Clive Granger during the years that the theory on cointegration was taking shape. In the period 1996-2001 he held a chair in Econometrics at the European University Institute.

According to some rankings, he was the most cited researcher in the world in economic journals.

Johansen is married to Katarina Juselius, who is also a professor at the University of Copenhagen and was ranked as the eighth most cited economist in the world from 1990 to 2000 (Johansen was first among this list). Juselius is the author of "The Cointegrated VAR Model: Methodology and Application" (2006) from Oxford University Press.

== Honours and awards ==
- 1967 Gold medal from University of Copenhagen for the thesis "An application of extreme points methods in probability"
- 1997 Dir. Ib Henriksens Fund Award, for outstanding research.

== Publications ==
- Johansen, S. (1988). "Statistical Analysis of Cointegration Vectors". Journal of Economic Dynamics and Control. 12 (2–3): 231–254. doi:10.1016/0165-1889(88)90041-3.
- Johansen, S. (1996). Likelihood Based Inference on Cointegration in the Vector Autoregressive Model (2nd ed.). Oxford University Press, Oxford.
- Hansen, P. R. & Johansen, S. (1998). Workbook on Cointegration. Oxford University Press, Oxford.
- Hoover, K.D, Johansen, S., & Juselius, K. (2008). "Allowing the Data to Speak Freely: The Macroeconometrics of the Cointegrated Vector Autoregression." American Economic Review 98 (2): 251–55 DOI: 10.1257/aer.98.2.251
- Johansen, S. & Swensen A.R. "Adjustment coefficients and exact rational expectations in cointegrated vector autoregressive models". (2024) Journal of Time Series Analysis 45(2): 248-268 DOI: 10.1111/jtsa.12705
- Johansen, S. & Gatarek L.T. "Optimal Portfolio Hedging With Cointegration". Oxford Bulletin of Economics and Statistics DOI: 10.1111/obes.70101
