= Yannis Papathanasiou =

Greek politician

Yannis Papathanasiou Γιάννης Παπαθανασίου
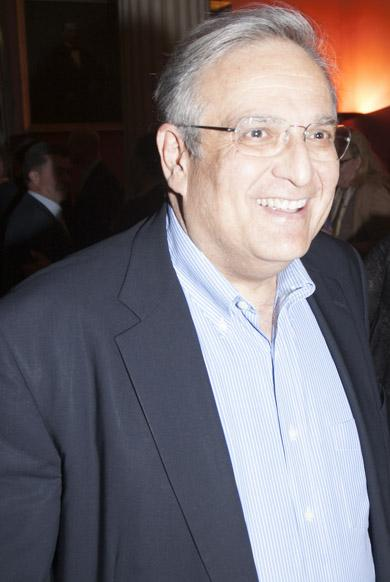

Minister of the Economy and Finance
- In office 8 January 2009 – 7 October 2009
- Prime Minister: Kostas Karamanlis
- Preceded by: Georgios Alogoskoufis
- Succeeded by: Louka Katseli (Economy, Competitiveness and Shipping); Giorgos Papakonstantinou (Finance)

Personal details
- Born: 1 January 1954 (age 72) Athens, Greece
- Party: New Democracy
- Spouse: Ileana Iliopoulou
- Education: National Technical University of Athens
- Website: Official website

Yannis Papathanasiou (Greek: Γιάννης Παπαθανασίου) (born 1 January 1954, in Athens) is a Greek politician, former Minister for Economy and Finance of Greece. He is a member of the Hellenic Parliament with the conservative New Democracy party since 2002.

== Background, business and political career ==
Papathanasiou was born in Athens in 1954. He studied Electrical Engineering at the National Technical University of Athens.

He has been chairman and managing director of the company ‘I. D. Papathanassiou SA - Trading of technological equipment for buildings since December 31, 2002.

He has been Member of the Board of Directors (1982–1988), Secretary General (1988–1993) and President (1994–2000) of the Athens Chamber of Commerce and Industry (ACCI).

In the period 1991-1992, he was advisor on energy issues, at the Minister of Commerce Industry and Energy and between 1992–1993, he has been vice-chairman of the Board of Directors of Public Gas Corporation (DEPA).

He was first elected member of the Hellenic Parliament in 2002, from the state deputies' list, with New Democracy party and then was elected member of the parliament in Athens B constituency, in the elections of 2004, 2007 and 2009.

Political offices
Preceded by Georgios Alogoskoufis	Minister of the Economy and Finance; 2009	Succeeded by Louka Katseli as Minister of the Economy, Competitiveness and Shipping
Preceded by Georgios Alogoskoufis	Minister of the Economy and Finance; 2009	Succeeded by Giorgos Papakonstantinou as Minister of Finance
