= Akis Tsochatzopoulos =

Greek politician, engineer, and economist (1939–2021)

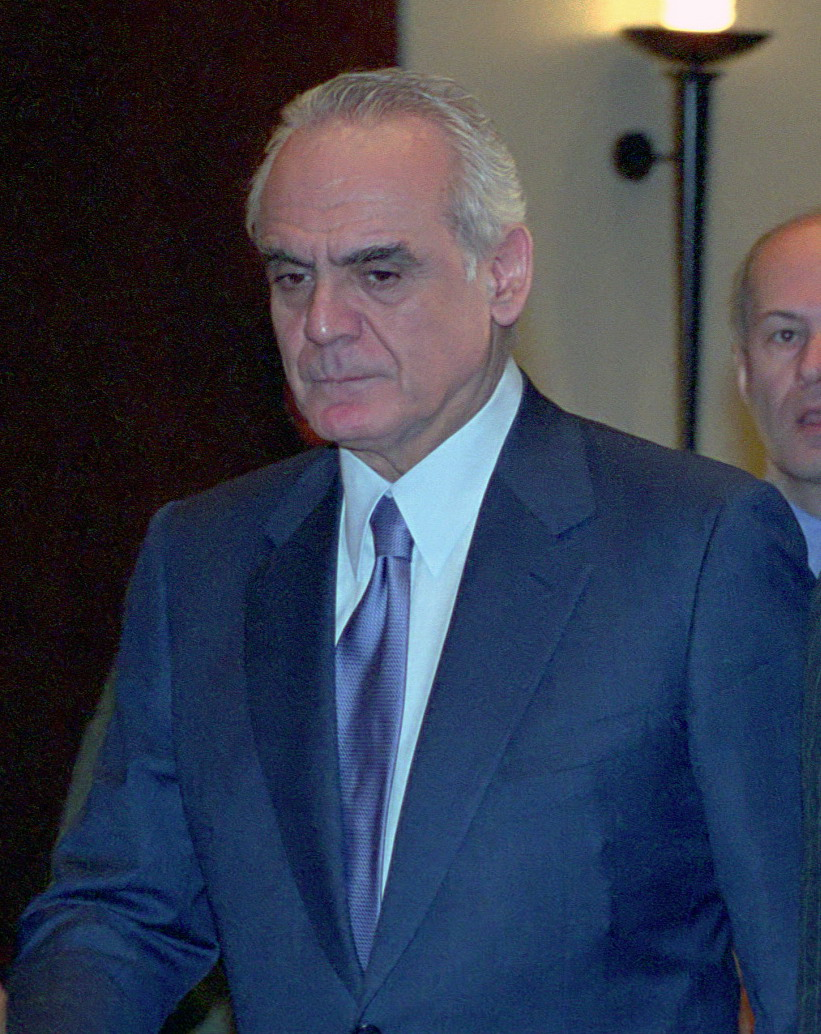

Member of the Hellenic Parliament
- In office 1981–2007

Minister of National Defence
- In office 24 September 1996 – 23 October 2001
- Prime Minister: Konstantinos Simitis
- Preceded by: Gerasimos Arsenis
- Succeeded by: Yiannos Papantoniou

Minister of the Interior
- In office 15 September 1995 – 30 August 1996
- Prime Minister: Andreas Papandreou; Konstantinos Simitis
- Preceded by: Kostas Skandalidis
- Succeeded by: Vassilios Skouris
- In office 13 October 1993 – 8 July 1994
- Prime Minister: Andreas Papandreou
- Preceded by: Ioannis Georgakis
- Succeeded by: Kostas Skandalidis
- In office 23 September 1987 – 2 June 1989
- Prime Minister: Andreas Papandreou
- Preceded by: Emmanouil Papastefanakis
- Succeeded by: Panagiotis Markopoulos

Μinister of Labour
- In office 5 June 1985 – 26 July 1985
- Prime Minister: Andreas Papandreou
- Preceded by: Evangelos Yannopoulos
- Succeeded by: Evangelos Yannopoulos

Μinister of Public Works
- In office 21 October 1981 – 5 October 1984
- Prime Minister: Andreas Papandreou
- Preceded by: Tzannis Tzannetakis
- Succeeded by: Giorgos Perrakis

Personal details
- Born: Apostolos-Athanasios Tsochatzopoulos; 31 July 1939 Athens, Greece
- Died: 27 August 2021 (aged 82) Athens, Greece
- Resting place: First Cemetery of Athens
- Party: PASOK
- Spouse: Gudrun Modenhauer (m. 1964; div. 2004) Vicky Stamatis (m. 2004)
- Children: 3
- Education: Technical University of Munich
- Occupation: Economist, engineer, politician

Apostolos-Athanasios "Akis" Tsochatzopoulos (Greek: Απόστολος-Αθανάσιος (Άκης) Τσοχατζόπουλος; 31 July 1939 – 27 August 2021) was a Greek politician, engineer, and economist. He served as a minister in several Panhellenic Socialist Movement (PASOK) cabinets between 1981 and 2004 most notably Minister of the Interior three times and the Minister of National Defence during the Andreas Papandreou and Konstantinos Simitis governments respectively.

Tsochatzopoulos was a founding member of PASOK. He was elected to the Hellenic Parliament for the first time in 1981 and remained in seat until 2007. On 1 July 2011, amid accusations of corruption scandals, the Hellenic Parliament voted in favor of pressing charges against him. He was subsequently convicted and received a 20-year prison sentence on 7 October 2013. In April 2018 he was granted early release from prison due to deteriorating health.

== Political career ==
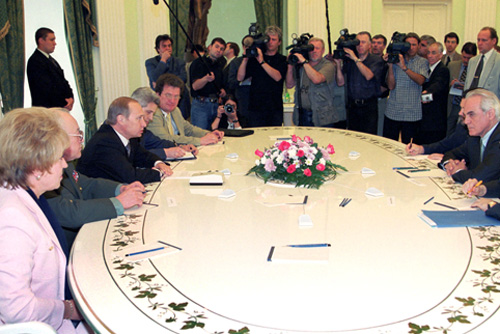
Vladimir Putin meeting with Minister for National Defence Akis Tsohatzopoulos on 7 July 2000

Tsochatzopoulos was a founding member of the PASOK party. In 1981, he was elected to the Hellenic Parliament and was a supporter of the Andreas Papandreou government. Under his government, he served as the Minister of Public Works between 1981 and 1985. He was later promoted to Minister for the Presidency of the Government from 1985 until 1987. He was also the Minister of the Interior three times under his government.

During the coalition government following the June and November 1989 elections, he served as the Minister of Transportation and Communication. Tsochatzopoulos ran for the PASOK leadership when Prime Minister Papandreou was in failing health in 1996. He narrowly lost the leadership election to Costas Simitis who subsequently became prime minister.

During the Simitis government, he served as the Minister of National Defence between 1996 and 2001. From 2001 to 2004, he served as the Minister of Development.

In Malta in 2002, Tsochatzopoulos was made an honorary member of the Xirka Ġieħ ir-Repubblika.

In 2004, he came under strong criticism by members of the press and Greece's political scene in regard to his wedding in Paris and the reception that followed at the Four Seasons Hotel in order to have a view of the Eiffel Tower.

Tsochatzopoulos was unable to win his re-election to the Hellenic parliament in the 2007 election and subsequently retired from politics in 2009.

== Corruption accusations ==
On 30 May 2010, the Greek newspapers I Kathimerini and Proto Thema publicized their discovery that Tsochatzopoulos and his wife Vicky Stamati, had purchased a house for one million euros from an offshore company on Dionysiou Areopagitou Street, in one of Athens' most prestigious neighborhoods, only a few days before parliament passed a series of austerity measures aimed at increasing taxes and combating tax evasion. Tsochatzopoulos threatened to go to the courts, but nevertheless on 7 June the committee in charge of the case asked for the removal of Tsochatzopoulos' party privileges because of evidence found against him.

In early 2011, following an investigation by a specialized committee of the Hellenic Parliament, evidence emerged that Tsochatzopoulos was also involved in the Siemens scandal. Among others, the committee statement included: "Mr. Tsochatzopoulos is being checked in regard to his activities in the capacity of Minister for National Defence between 1996 and 2001. The Committee combines the orders for defence systems that occurred under his leadership with the confessions of the people managing the 'black' money given by Siemens as bribe for the MIM-104 Patriot systems."

On 31 March 2011, a parliamentary committee decided to inspect Tsochatzopoulos' assets, as well as those of New Democracy politician George Alogoskoufis and another former minister of the same party, on whose account deposits of up to €178 million were found. The aim of the investigation into Tsochatzopoulos' assets was to determine whether his tax forms were truthful or if any other irregularities had occurred.

In April 2011 new evidence emerged that tied Tsochatzopoulos to yet another scandal. According to the newspaper Real News, representatives of the German company Ferrostaal thanked Tsochatzopoulos for its being chosen to supply submarines for the Greek Navy before a deal had been signed. Tsochatzopoulos threatened to go to court over the newspaper's front page, which he considered to be "insulting" and defamatory. In mid-April, the parliamentary group of PASOK decided to create a committee to investigate the submarine scandal. Tsochatzopoulos accused the parliamentary group of acting in line with the opposition and of making wrong moves against him. A few days later he asked the Areios Pagos (Greece's supreme court) to move faster with the investigation of his assets. On 11 April 2011, the George Papandreou government decided to expel him from the party.

== Conviction ==
A vote in parliament on 28 April on the creation of a committee to determine whether or not Tsochatzopoulos should be held accountable for criminal actions in the purchase of the German type 214 submarines was voted overwhelmingly in favor, with 226 of 300 votes in the house. Almost a month later, on 26 May, the findings on the committee for the investigation of Tsochatzopoulos' assets were published; they found that Tsochatzopoulos had lied about the value of his home, which was greater than his tax documents stated.

On 6 June 2011, the committee decision in relation to the purchase of the German submarines was handed over to the president of the Hellenic Parliament. The committee suggested that Tsochatzopoulos be criminally charged for attempting to pass off money obtained through illegal means as legitimate. The same day he gave an interview to the Greek TV channel Skai where he denied all charges and said that the accusations were a plot against him.

On 1 July 2011, the committee's suggestion that charges be brought against Tsochatzopoulos was passed in parliament with a majority of 216 of 300 seats. On 11 April 2012, he was arrested on charges of money laundering.

On 7 October 2013, he was found "guilty on all charges". The following day he was sentenced to the maximum penalty of 20 years' incarceration. Tsochatzopoulos was transferred to Korydallos Prisons in October 2013. In May 2017, a court upheld his conviction, cutting his sentence to 19 years.

== Personal life ==
Tsochatzopoulos was born in Athens, however was raised in Thessaloniki. He was educated at the Technical University of Munich. In 2004, he married Vicky Stamatis. He was both an economist and engineer by profession.

Tsochatzopoulos suffered from multiple health problems and underwent heart surgery. After five years in prison, he was released early in July 2018 because of his serious health problems. He died on 27 August 2021 at a hospital in Athens from a heart attack, aged 82.
