= Michael P. Clements =

British economist

Michael P. Clements is a British economist. He is Professor of Econometrics at the ICMA Centre, Henley Business School, University of Reading.

Clements earned a DPhil in Econometrics at Nuffield College, Oxford in 1993. His research focuses on time-series econometrics, economic forecasting, and model uncertainty.

He has co-authored multiple books, including Forecasting: An Essential Introduction with co-authors David F. Hendry and Jennifer L. Castle.
