= Journal of Econometrics =

- Discipline: Econometrics
- Language: English
- Edited by: Michael Jansson, Aureo de Paula

Publication details
- History: 1973–present
- Publisher: Elsevier
- Frequency: Monthly
- Impact factor: 9.9 (2023)

Standard abbreviations
- ISO 4: J. Econom.
- MathSciNet: J. Econometrics

Indexing
- CODEN: JECMB6
- ISSN: 0304-4076 (print); 1872-6895 (web)
- LCCN: 73646127
- OCLC no.: 1788577

Links
- Journal homepage; Online archive

The Journal of Econometrics is a monthly peer-reviewed academic journal covering econometrics. It was established in 1973. The editors-in-chief are Michael Jansson (University of California Berkeley) and Aureo de Paula (University College London). According to the Journal Citation Reports, the journal has a 2023 impact factor of 9.9.

The journal covers work dealing with estimation and other methodological aspects of the application of statistical inference to economic data, as well as papers dealing with the application of econometric techniques to economics.

Unusually among journals the title of Fellow of Journal of Econometrics is offered to anyone publishing four or more articles in the Journal.

== See also ==
- Econometrics Journal
