= Royal Economic Society =

- Formation: 1890; 136 years ago (as the British Economic Association); 1902; 124 years ago (became Royal Economic Society on receiving a Royal Charter)
- Legal status: Registered charity
- Purpose: Promoting the study of economic science
- Headquarters: London, UK
- Members: 3,850 individual members plus approx 4,600 individuals employed by 10 group members and 6 institutional members.
- Patron: Charles III
- Chair of the Trustee Board: Sir Anton Muscatelli
- President: Anthony Venables
- Chief Executive: Leighton Chipperfield
- Website: res.org.uk

The Royal Economic Society (RES) is a professional association and learned society that promotes the study of economics. Originally established in 1890 as the British Economic Association, it was incorporated by royal charter on 2 December 1902. The Society is a charity registered with the U.K. Charity Commission under charity number 231508. Its patron is Charles III.

== Governance and management ==
The Society is led by a Trustee Board that is responsible for developing and executing the Society's policies and activities, with day-to-day responsibility for the running of the Society delegated to the Chief Executive, Leighton Chipperfield. The Society's current president is Anthony Venables.

== Logo ==
The logo of the Royal Economic Society is a bee because it is inspired by Bernard Mandeville's work The Fable of the Bees (1705), which uses the beehive as a metaphor for economics and fundamental principles such as the division of labor and the invisible hand.

== Strategy ==
Following a member consultation, in late 2023 the RES launched its 2024-2028 strategy with a focus on four strategic priorities:

- Bring communities of economists together
- Advocate for economics
- Improve diversity, inclusion and integrity in the profession
- Develop the next generation of economists

The Society's previous strategy was published in 2019. Amongst other things this gave a greater focus to promoting the discipline and improving diversity. In the same year the RES announced the launch of Discover Economics, a campaign to introduce the subject to students.

== Membership ==
In 2023, the RES announced it was launching an Institutional Membership programme. The Bank of England, the Government Economic Service and Frontier Economics were announced as the Society's first institutional members.

In 2025 the Society launched a Fellows category, recognising those who have made a substantial contribution to the discipline irrespective of the sector in which they are employed. RES Fellows are entitled to use the post-nominal letters FREcon. The founding Fellows were announced on 1 May 2025.

== Publications ==
The Society publishes The Economic Journal, first published in 1891, and The Econometrics Journal, first published in 1998. Both journals are available online through the RES website. In 2024 it announced the launched of The Economic Journal Special Issues. Prof Alberto Bisin was appointed as the inaugural Special Issues Editor effective from September 2024.

== Policy and campaigns ==
The Society advocates for improved diversity and inclusion in economics and runs various activities to both measure and bring about this change. The Society also advocates for the importance of funding economic research and education, including via CHUDE (Conference of Heads of University Departments of Economics), which comprises Heads of Economics at universities in the UK.

== History ==
British Economic Association was founded in response to changing attitudes towards economics in the 1880s. Up until that point, the study of economics was typically taught as part of a broad curriculum, alongside subjects such as history and philosophy, and those engaging in the study of economics came from a number of professions and academic disciplines. Towards the end of the nineteenth century, there were academic movements to clearly demarcate and to define disciplines as scholarly subjects in their own right. For example, those in the fields of history and philosophy inaugurated such journals as The English Historical Review (1886) and Mind (1887), publications aimed mainly at their respective areas of study. Economic thinkers followed this example.

The same period also saw the revival of fundamentalist, socialist critique of economics. In order to protect the discipline from damaging criticism while still encouraging intellectual discussion, many economic thinkers strove to draw economics more decidedly within the realm of scholarly debate.

The establishment of an economic society in this era of change indicated a desire to strengthen economics as a well-respected academic discipline, and to encourage debate and research between specialist scholars. In an announcement to the American Economic Association dated 1887 which proposed the formation of an Economic Society in Britain, scholars acknowledged common criticisms of economics and the contemporary disunity in the discipline. They called for a society which would aim to advance theory, consolidate economic opinion, encourage historical research, and critique industrial and financial policy.

=== Initial proposals for a society ===
Initial proposals for a British Society of Economics were drafted as early as 1883. Discussion began between Herbert Somerton Foxwell and Sir Robert Harry Inglis Palgrave. Palgrave had suggested creating a society specializing in the publication of translations and reprints of significant economic works. However, Foxwell had a more ambitious scheme in mind - a society that published a quarterly journal along the lines of the Quarterly Journal of Economics or the Journal des Économistes.

There is no doubt that Foxwell's plans were influenced by foreign models, such as the German body Verein für Socialpolitik, founded in 1887, the French journals, the Journal des Économistes and the Revue d'Economie Politique established in 1841 and 1887, and the American Economic Association inaugurated in 1885. Indeed, in 1887, Foxwell published an announcement in the Association’s publication saying "it is scarcely doubtful that we shall shortly follow the lead so ably set us on your side of the Atlantic." As the discipline of economics was promoted and strengthened in America and Europe, scholars in the U.K. recognized an increasing urgency to ensure that British economic thought was represented. Certainly, Foxwell was not the only economist to propose the establishment of a scholarly journal in Britain. The Economic Review was established by scholars in Oxford in 1889, the year before the British Economic Association was inaugurated in London, and its publication, The Economic Journal, was set up.

While there was a recognized need for a society of economists in the 1880s, it took a considerable time for Foxwell’s plans to come to fruition. One of the reasons for the delay was Alfred Marshall (1842-1924), Professor at Cambridge. Foxwell and Palgrave were keen to involve Marshall in the development of the association and its publication. Marshall was fully supportive of their plans, but as preparations progressed, he became preoccupied in completing his Principles of Economics. His former pupil, Edward Gonner, tried to encourage Marshall to participate in discussions to finalise the society but was unable to drive Marshall to action. He remarked to Foxwell that:

... for the next two years or so the matter must rest in abeyance unless active measures be taken. Of course, I know he will be glad if such be done and I am sure he will render assistance but he will not take the initiative.

Gonner and Foxwell had to move on with the foundation of the society without Marshall. Marshall was only drawn back into the discussion when proposals for the nature of the society did not meet his approval.

=== Nature of the society ===
There had been much debate about what kind of society should be formed. Palgrave, Foxwell, and Marshall had discussed the idea that an economic journal should be attached to the Royal Statistical Society. But after some negative discussions with the society, the idea was dropped. Marshall had hoped the group would come together naturally, centred around scholars at Cambridge. Gonner, however, wanted the society to be an honoured institution of scholars. He argued that members should be selected "not for an interest in economics but for work." "Some scientific qualification" should also be essential for membership. Foxwell seems to have agreed with this approach. However, Marshall opposed the idea. He explained to Foxwell: "I don’t want to include 'mere' businessmen. But I don’t want to exclude Bank Directors and others of the class who are for me, at least, the most interesting members of the Political Economy Club...It is men of affairs from whom I learn". Marshall succeeded in persuading his friends. At its inauguration the society was made available to all those with an interest in economics, regardless of their scholarly qualifications.

=== Finding an editor ===
The inclusive attitude of society membership was also extended to the aims of its proposed journal. It was agreed that the publication should provide a forum for all views and opinions. The criteria for selection in the journal would be scholarly excellence, not political or scholarly persuasion. However, there was much difficulty in finding a suitable editor to manage such a journal. Foxwell had favoured the appointment of John Neville Keynes as editor, but he was not available. Foxwell admitted that without Keynes, the appointment was a difficult one:

...any number of men with strong views will volunteer, but these are just the persons we don’t want. We want cool heads, keen brains and impartial judgement. With these are required scholarship, information and, if possible, a knowledge of German. It seems to me a most difficult and delicate post.

The search for an editor caused serious delays. It was not until 1890, the year of the society’s inauguration, that Francis Ysidro Edgeworth was appointed editor. Edgeworth held a chair in Economics at King's College London and was appointed Drummond Professor of Political Economy at Oxford University in 1891. Though his academic standing made him an excellent candidate for the role, Edgeworth admitted the difficulties of establishing a new journal:

I wrote to Marshall asking advice on every small difficulty which arose, until he protested that, if the correspondence was to go on at that rate, he would have to use envelopes with my address printed on them.

Despite initial difficulties, Edgeworth’s editorship was highly successful and he remained editor for the next 34 years.

=== Inauguration of the society ===
After years of discussion and delay, the British Economic Association (BEA) was inaugurated at University College London on 20 November 1890. Alfred Marshall wrote a letter of invitation to scholars and businessmen interested in economics, drawing around 200 people to the meeting. In the letter, Marshall set out the central aims of the society, to encourage debate and enable the dissemination of economic research through the medium of a British academic journal.

Attendees unanimously showed their support for the plans. Edgeworth was formally appointed as editor of The Economic Journal. George Goschen, Second Viscount Goschen, the statesman and businessman, was selected as president of the society.

George Bernard Shaw politely questioned the suitability of "a gentleman who was identified with any political party in the state" as head of the society, but Marshall responded:

I am one of those who am not in political support of Mr. Goschen. I believe all agree with me that since we cannot have an economist who has no political opinions at all; we could not have a better President than Mr. Goschen.

=== Early years ===
After the elections, the BEA wasted no time in carrying out its aims to publish a journal. The first issue of The Economic Journal was printed in March 1891, with the editor’s promise that:

The most opposite doctrines may meet here as on a fair field...Opposing theories of currency will be represented with equal impartiality. Nor will it be attempted to prescribe the method, any more than the result, of scientific investigation.

While The Economic Journal provided an outlet for the scholarly assessment of economic theory and policy, and helped to establish economics as a distinct and significant area of research, the BEA was slow to make an impact on the development of economics in other areas. As president, Goschen demonstrated a vehement desire to improve the status of economics in public opinion. At the inaugural council meeting, he warned of a "general idea that economists had finished their proper work in the education of the nation." At the BEA annual dinner in 1895, he argued that economics "was not treated with the respect accorded to other sciences."

But despite Goschen’s vocal concern, the BEA could not make an immediate impact. The council made a bid to the Council of Legal Education to add economics to its subject of instruction, but failed to succeed in this endeavour.

The slow progress of the BEA in its early years may be explained by the difficulties in establishing a financially viable association and journal. Membership fluctuated considerably in the first ten years, rising to a high of 750 members in 1893-4 before falling by around 40 per cent between 1892 and 1900. During this period, it was necessary to reconsider the printing arrangements of the Journal to ensure the financial stability of the association. In time, the association established itself as a stable and successful economic institution. By the beginning of World War II, membership had risen to over 4,500 under the management of John Maynard Keynes. Aside from the impact of successive presidents and editors, it is possible that the application for royal charter in 1900 had some effect on this gradual improvement, establishing the BEA as a well-respected and significant economic institution.

=== Royal Charter ===
The secretary of the BEA, Henry Higgs, proposed that the council apply for royal charter ten years after its inauguration. Ten volumes of the Economic Journal were presented to King Edward VII, with the request that he become Patron of the Society. Royal charter was duly granted on 2 December 1902. The charter indicated the society’s work to further economic science, its collection of a specialist library and its publication of a journal, saying:

And whereas in order to secure the property of the said society, to extend its operations, and to give it its due position among the Scientific Institutions of Our Kingdom, we have been besought to grant George Joachim Viscount Goschen, and to those who now are members of the said society, or who shall from time to time be elected Fellows of the Royal Economic Society hereby incorporated, Our Royal Charter of Incorporation for the purposes aforesaid.

The British Economic Association, on accepting the royal charter, became the Royal Economic Society.

== Society activity ==
Palgrave had been keen to establish the publication of economic works from the society's very inception. The RES has supported a number of such publications; for example, the works and correspondence of David Ricardo, Alfred Marshall's Principles of Economics, Centenary Essays and Correspondence, the Essay on the Principle of Population, Principles of Political Economy, and Travel Diaries of T. R. Malthus, Francis Ysidro Edgeworth's Mathematical Psychics and Papers on Political Economy and Hiroshi Mizuta’s work on Adam Smith’s library. The society also published The Economic Advisory Council: A Study of Economic Advice During Depression and Recovery by Susan Howson and Donald Winch.

The preservation of the history of economics was also at the forefront of the Royal Economic Society’s activities from its early years. The council funded the repair of Adam Smith’s grave in 1942 and organized the cleaning of Malthus’ memorial in the 1960s. In 1972, it supported the organization of a bicentennial Exhibition on Ricardo at the Drapers Company. The society also took a great interest in recording its own history. In the 1960s, the society liaised with A.W. Coats, providing him with archival access to help with the writing of his paper, "Origins and Early Development of the Royal Economic Society", which was published in The Economic Journal. In 1990, John Hey and Donald Winch co-edited A Century of Economics: 100 Years of the Royal Economic Society and the Economic Journal to celebrate the centenary of the society and the journal. The RES also gave support and sponsorship to the publication of the Guide to Archive Sources in the 1970s, a volume which became the basis for a website on economists' papers from the years 1750-2000.

The society supported contemporary economic research by hosting specialist conferences on varied topics including Decision Analysis (1973), Wages and Unemployment (1981), and Exchange Rate Systems (1986). Today, the RES conference is an annual event, attracting over 400 presenters speaking on varied topics over several days.

The RES established activities to support economists at every stage in their career. The RES Annual Policy Lecture, established in 2001, aimed to expose sixth form students and members of the general public to the research of top economists. The Young Economist of the Year essay competition initiated in 2007, its purpose being to encourage young students to think critically about key economic issues. The Austin Robinson Prize (2007), given to the best paper published in The Economic Journal by an author within five years of completing their Ph.D., was instituted to support the development of early-career scholars. The RES Prize (1990), given annually to the best paper published in The Economic Journal, was set up to celebrate the work of established economists. In 1987, the Conference Heads of University Departments of Economics was established to bring together heads of Economic departments with the aim of promoting the teaching and studying of Economics in the UK. In addition to these initiatives, the RES founded the Women’s Committee in 1996, developed to promote the role of women in the UK economics profession, with a particular concern for career entrants.

One of the most significant of the Royal Economic Society’s recent activities was the inauguration of The Econometrics Journal (EctJ) in 1998. Recognizing the need for a journal dedicated to econometric research, the RES established the EctJ, with the aim of creating a top international field journal for the publication of macro- micro, and financial econometrics. In 2011 the editors of The Econometrics Journal initiated the annual Denis Sargan Econometrics Prize, awarded annually to the best article published in journal.

In 2022, the RES launched the Medal for Services to the Economics Profession to recognise an individual who has made an outstanding and lasting contribution to the profession. Medal winners to date have been Professor Dame Wendy Carlin (2023), Professor Denise Osborn(2024), Professor Sarah Smith (2025) and Professor Sir Richard Blundell (2026).
