= OxMetrics =

Econometric software package

- Developer(s): OxMetrics Technologies
- Stable release: 7.0 / July 2013
- Operating system: Windows Mac OS X Linux
- Type: programming language econometric software
- License: proprietary
- Website: www.timberlake.co.uk/software/oxmetrics.html

OxMetrics is an econometric software including the Ox programming language for econometrics and statistics, developed by Jurgen Doornik and David Hendry. OxMetrics originates from PcGive, one of the first econometric software for personal computers, initiated by David Hendry in the 1980s at the London School of Economics.

OxMetrics builds on the Ox programming language of Jurgen Doornik developed at University of Oxford. Renfro (2004) describes the history of econometric software packages.

OxMetrics is a family of software packages for the econometric and financial analysis of time series, forecasting, econometric model selection and for the statistical analysis of cross-sectional data and panel data.

The main modules apart from PcGive for dynamic econometric models (ARDL, VAR, GARCH, Switching, Autometrics), panel data models (DPD), limited dependent models, are STAMP for structural time series modelling, "SsfPack" for State space methods and "G@RCH" for financial volatility modelling. Hendry & Nielsen (2007) present many empirical examples in PcGive for OxMetrics in their econometrics textbook. Durbin & Koopman (2012) give modern examples in their time series analysis textbook.

== See also ==
- Econometric software
- Comparison of statistical packages
