= Oxford Economic Papers =

- Discipline: Economics
- Language: English
- Edited by: James Forder, Francis J. Teal

Publication details
- History: Since 1938
- Publisher: Oxford University Press
- Frequency: Quarterly

Standard abbreviations
- ISO 4: Oxf. Econ. Pap.

Indexing
- ISSN: 0030-7653 (print); 1464-3812 (web)
- JSTOR: oxfoeconpape

Links
- Journal homepage

Oxford Economic Papers is a peer reviewed academic journal of general economics published by Oxford University Press since 1938.
