= European Economic Review =

- Language: English
- Edited by: Evi Pappa; David K. Levine; Robert Sauer; Peter Rupert; Stefania Garetto

Publication details
- History: 1969–present
- Publisher: Elsevier
- Frequency: 10/year
- Impact factor: 2.8 (2022)

Standard abbreviations
- ISO 4: Eur. Econ. Rev.

Indexing
- ISSN: 0014-2921
- OCLC no.: 1568446

Links
- Journal homepage; Online archive

The European Economic Review is a peer-reviewed academic journal that covers research in economics. The journal was established in 1969 and the editors-in-chief are Evi Pappa (Universidad Carlos III de Madrid), David K. Levine (Royal Holloway University of London), Stefania Garetto (Boston University), Peter Rupert (University of California at Santa Barbara), and Robert Sauer (Royal Holloway University of London).

According to the Journal Citation Reports, the journal has a 2022 impact factor of 2.8.
