= Journal of Economic Dynamics and Control =

- insert a caption here
- Discipline: Economics
- Language: English
- Edited by: James Bullard, Herbert Dawid, Xuezhong (Tony) He, Thomas Lubik, B. Ravikumar, Juan Rubio-Ramirez

Publication details
- History: 1979–present
- Publisher: Elsevier (Netherlands)
- Frequency: Monthly
- Impact factor: 1.588 (2020)

Standard abbreviations
- ISO 4: J. Econ. Dyn. Control
- MathSciNet: J. Econom. Dynam. Control

Indexing
- CODEN: JEDCDH
- ISSN: 0165-1889
- LCCN: 97660634
- OCLC no.: 5380104

Links
- Journal homepage; Online access

The Journal of Economic Dynamics and Control (JEDC) is a peer-reviewed scholarly journal devoted to computational economics, dynamic economic models, and macroeconomics. It is edited at the University of Amsterdam and published by Elsevier. It has been published since 1979.

The journal sometimes devotes special issues to particular topics, like 'Complexity in Economics and Finance' (May 2009), 'Dynamic Stochastic General Equilibrium Modelling' (August 2008), and 'Applications of Statistical Physics in Economics and Finance' (January 2008). In some years it has also published selected articles from the annual meeting of the Society for Computational Economics.

In their ranking of academic impact of economics journals, Kalaitzidakis et al. (2003) rank JEDC twenty-third out of 159 journals. while Kodrzycki and Yu (2006) rank it 27th out of 181 journals for its impact on economics.

== See also ==
- List of scholarly journals in economics
