= Journal of Business & Economic Statistics =

Academic journal on business and economics

- Discipline: Econometrics
- Language: English
- Edited by: Jamie Hutchens

Publication details
- History: 1983–present
- Publisher: Taylor & Francis Group
- Open access: Yes
- Impact factor: 3.0 (2022)

Standard abbreviations
- ISO 4: J. Bus. Econ. Stat.
- MathSciNet: J. Bus. Econom. Statist.

Indexing
- ISSN: 0735-0015 (print); 1537-2707 (web)

Links
- Online access; Online archive

The Journal of Business & Economic Statistics is a quarterly peer-reviewed academic journal published by the American Statistical Association. The journal covers a broad range of applied problems in business and economic statistics, including forecasting, seasonal adjustment, applied demand and cost analysis, applied econometric modeling, empirical finance, analysis of survey and longitudinal data related to business and economic problems, the impact of discrimination on wages and productivity, the returns to education and training, the effects of unionization, and applications of stochastic control theory to business and economic problems.

== See also ==
- List of scholarly journals in economics
