= The Econometrics Journal =

- Discipline: Econometrics
- Language: English
- Edited by: Jaap H. Abbring

Publication details
- History: 1998–present
- Publisher: Oxford University Press on behalf of the Royal Economic Society (United Kingdom)
- Frequency: Triannual
- Impact factor: 4.571 (2020)

Standard abbreviations
- ISO 4: Econom. J.

Indexing
- ISSN: 1368-4221 (print); 1368-423X (web)
- LCCN: sn99038106
- JSTOR: econometricsj
- OCLC no.: 858834121

Links
- Journal homepage; Current and past issues; Advance articles

The Econometrics Journal was established in 1998 by the Royal Economic Society to promote the general advancement and application of econometric methods and techniques to problems of relevance to modern economics. It aims to publish high quality research papers relevant to contemporary econometrics in which primary emphasis is placed on important and original contributions of substantive direct or potential value in applications. It is particularly interested in path-breaking articles in econometrics and empirical economics that address leading cases rather than provide an exhaustive treatment.

The journal is published by Oxford University Press on behalf of the Royal Economic Society. According to the Journal Citation Reports, the journal has a 2020 impact factor of 4.571.
