= Economic Policy (journal) =

- Discipline: Economics
- Language: English

Publication details
- History: 1985–present
- Publisher: Oxford Academic With Centre for Economic Policy Research, Center for Economic Studies of LMU Munich, and the Paris School of Economics
- Frequency: Quarterly
- Impact factor: 3.424 (2018)

Standard abbreviations
- ISO 4: Econ. Policy

Indexing
- ISSN: 0266-4658 (print); 1468-0327 (web)
- LCCN: 86649416
- JSTOR: 02664658
- OCLC no.: 463705996

Links
- Journal homepage

Economic Policy is a quarterly peer-reviewed academic journal published by Oxford Academic on behalf of the Centre for Economic Policy Research, the Center for Economic Studies (LMU Munich), and the Paris School of Economics. The journal was established in 1985 and covers international economic policy topics such as macroeconomics, microeconomics, the labour market, trade, exchange rate, taxation, economic growth, government spending, and migration.

The journal had an impact factor of 2.844 in 2016, ranking it 33/347 in the category "Economics".
