= Oxford Bulletin of Economics and Statistics =

- Discipline: Social Sciences, Mathematical Methods, Statistics and Probability and Economics
- Language: English

Publication details
- Former names: Bulletin of the Oxford University Institute of Economics & Statistics
- History: 1973-Present; 1939-1972 as Bulletin of the Oxford University Institute of Economics & Statistics
- Publisher: John Wiley & Sons on behalf of Department of Economics, University of Oxford
- Frequency: Bimonthly
- Impact factor: 1.791 (2020)

Standard abbreviations
- ISO 4: Oxf. Bull. Econ. Stat.

Indexing
- ISSN: 0305-9049 (print); 1468-0084 (web)

Links
- Journal homepage; Online archive

Oxford Bulletin of Economics and Statistics is a bimonthly peer-reviewed academic journal published by John Wiley & Sons on behalf of the Department of Economics, University of Oxford. The journal was established in 1939 as the Bulletin of the Oxford University Institute of Economics and Statistics and became the Oxford Bulletin of Economics and Statistics in 1973. The journal publishes articles on applied economics with emphasis placed on the practical importance, theoretical interest and policy-relevance of their results. General topics include macroeconomics, microeconomics, derivatives, investment and interest rates.

According to the Journal Citation Reports, the journal has a 2020 impact factor of 1.791, ranking it 33rd out of 52 journals in the category "Social Sciences, Mathematical Methods", 53rd out of 125 journals in the category "Statistics & Probability" and 204th out of 378 journals in the category "Economics".
