= The Economic Journal =

Academic journal on Economics, published by RES and Oxford University

- Discipline: Economics
- Language: English
- Edited by: Francesco Lippi

Publication details
- History: 1891–present
- Publisher: Oxford University Press for the Royal Economic Society (United Kingdom)
- Frequency: 8/year
- Impact factor: 3.178 (2020)

Standard abbreviations
- ISO 4: Econ. J.

Indexing
- CODEN: ECJOAB
- ISSN: 0013-0133 (print); 1468-0297 (web)
- LCCN: 07041368
- JSTOR: 00130133
- OCLC no.: 299660344

Links
- Journal homepage; Online archive; Journal page at society website

The Economic Journal is a peer-reviewed academic journal of economics published on behalf of the Royal Economic Society by Oxford University Press. The journal was established in 1891 and publishes papers from all areas of economics. The editor-in-chief is Francesco Lippi (Libera Università Internazionale degli Studi Sociali Guido Carli & Einaudi Institute for Economics and Finance).

According to the Journal Citation Reports, the journal has a 2020 impact factor of 3.178.

== History ==
=== Introduction ===
The journal was conceived in November 1890, at the inauguration of the British Economic Association (which became the Royal Economic Society in 1902). One of the central aims of the new society was to create a forum through which British economic research could be published. In a circular sent out before the inaugural meeting, Alfred Marshall, one of the founding members of the society, indicated the significant impact a new journal would have on British economic science:

...the need of an economic journal has long been felt in England. Every other country in which economic studies are pursued with great activity offers facilities for the publication of thorough scientific work... Englishmen (however)...are sometimes compelled to give their views to the world in the columns of a foreign periodical, or as a publication of the American Economic Association; but more frequently they put it aside till an opportunity should offer for working it out more fully and publishing it as a book; and that opportunity too often does not come.

His words attracted around 200 people to the opening meeting of the Association, a demonstration of both the growing interest in economic science in England and the consensus that there was a need for a publication to represent this field in Britain. In response to this overwhelming support, the Economic Journal was published soon after the foundation of the Association, in March 1891.

=== Genesis of the journal ===
Between the years of 1886 and 1890 there had been much dialogue amongst respected British economists about the formation of a journal of economics. Sir Robert Harry Inglis Palgrave (1827–1919), Editor of the Economist, initially proposed setting up a society that specialised in publishing translations and reprints of scarce economic works. Herbert Somerton Foxwell (1849–1936), chair of Economics at University College London however, had a more ambitious venture in mind; a quarterly journal of current scholarship equivalent to such publications as the Quarterly Journal of Economics and the Journal des Economistes. This type of publication, he argued, would enable British economists to ‘fraternise’ with the likes of the American Economic Association.

Palgrave, Foxwell and Marshall first explored the possibility of establishing such a publication as part of the Royal Statistical Society. After discussions with the society, however, it was concluded that a new organisation should be inaugurated to pursue these aims. This decision was supported by the economist and philosopher John Neville Keynes (1852–1949).

The founding members decided that an economic society should be created that was open to all those with an interest in economics, be they politicians, policy makers, scholars or laymen. The journal would follow a similar attitude of tolerance, publishing work from all areas of economic science with impartiality. The introduction to the first edition of the Economic Journal reiterated these intentions:

The most opposite doctrines may meet here as on a fair field...Opposing theories of currency will be represented with equal impartiality. Nor will it be attempted to prescribe the method, any more than the result, of scientific investigation.

Early issues of the journal indicate the meticulous efforts of the editors to adhere to this promise. Amongst the articles published in the early issues of the Journal were papers expressing socialist, individualist and Ruskinian views. The early insistence on publishing high quality works with impartiality and inclusivity has shaped the Economic Journal throughout its history.

== Past editors ==
The Economic Journal has been edited by some influential British economists. The first Editor of the Economic Journal in 1891 was Francis Ysidro Edgeworth (1845–1926). Edgeworth held a chair in economics at King's College London in 1888, and was appointed Drummond Professor of Political Economy at Oxford University in 1891. Despite his academic credentials, Edgeworth admitted the difficulty of establishing the new journal. He noted that after his appointment as editor:

I wrote to Marshall asking advice on every small difficulty which arose, until he protested that, if the correspondence was to go on at that rate, he would have to use envelopes with my address printed on them.

Edgeworth continued his work as editor until 1911, assisted between 1896 and 1905 by Henry Higgs (1864–1940), one of the founding members of the British Economic Association, and a key player in the Society's application for Royal Charter in 1902. Edgeworth reprised his editorial role between 1918 and 1925 alongside John Maynard Keynes.

John Maynard Keynes (1883–1946), the leading economic theorist, civil service policy maker and the son of John Neville Keynes, took up the editorial position between 1912 and 1944, ensuring the continued publication of the Journal through both the First World War and the Second World War. During his lengthy term he edited alongside the former student of Marshall and Professor of Political Economics at Leeds University D. H. MacGregor (Joint Editor between 1925 and 1933) and one of his own former students Austin Robinson (Assistant Editor 1934–1940).

The editorship of Sir Austin Robinson (1897–1993) began in 1934 as an Assistant Editor and ended in 1970 as Editor. Robinson was a Government Adviser to the War Cabinet and the Board of Trade before returning to Cambridge as a lecturer. During his 36-year service for the Economic Journal, Robinson also served as secretary for the Royal Economic Society. As commemoration for his dedicated service to the Economic Journal, a prize is now offered in his honour.

Edgeworth and Keynes were the only editors to take sole responsibility for the Economic Journal. As the journal grew in size and significance, so too did the editorial board. By the 1980s the EJ was publishing 5 issues a year, supervised by at least six editors. In 1991 this was increased to 6 issues a year and in 1999 the current format of 8 issues per year was established. Today, the Economic Journal is overseen by seven joint managing editors.
