= Einaudi Institute for Economics and Finance =

Italian-based economics research institute

The Einaudi Institute for Economics and Finance (EIEF) (Italian: Istituto Einaudi per l'Economia e la Finanza), is an Italian based institution devoted to teaching and research in Economics, funded by the Bank of Italy based in Rome.

The Institute builds on the tradition of its predecessor, the Ente Luigi Einaudi, that has fostered economic research in Italy for the past fifty years.

The Einaudi Institute for Economics and Finance, named after Italian politician and economist Luigi Einaudi, produces research, with an emphasis on policy relevant topics. It also seeks to influence public thinking and to train the next generation of scholars by running seminar series, graduate level courses and conferences.

It runs two graduate programs, an MSc in Economics (Rome Masters in Economics/RoME) and a PhD in Economics (Rome Economics Doctorate/RED). Both are taught in English. The official degree for RoME is granted by LUISS, while the official degree for RED is granted by LUISS and University of Rome Tor Vergata jointly.
