= Noci (surname) =

Noci is an Italian surname. Notable people with this surname include:

- Arturo Noci (1874–1953), Italian Divisionist painter
- Javier Díaz Noci (born 1964), a Spanish professor and researcher of journalism
- Maurizio Noci (1937–2019), Italian politician

== See also ==
- Noce
- Noci
