= Galter =

Galter is a surname. Notable people with the surname include:

- Irène Galter (1931–2018), Italian actress
- Lluís Galter (born 1983), Spanish film director and screenwriter
- Luís Carlos Galter (1947–2025), Brazilian football player
- Pietro Galter (1840–1901), Italian painter

== See also ==
- Galter Pavilion, a skyscraper in Chicago, Illinois, United States
