= Freesound =

Collaborative database of audio snippets, samples, recordings, bleeps

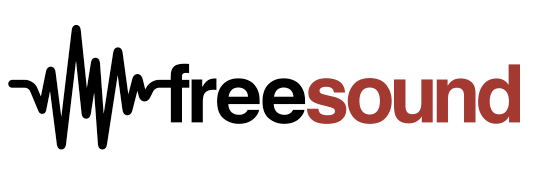
- Freesound's logo, stylised as 'freesound'.

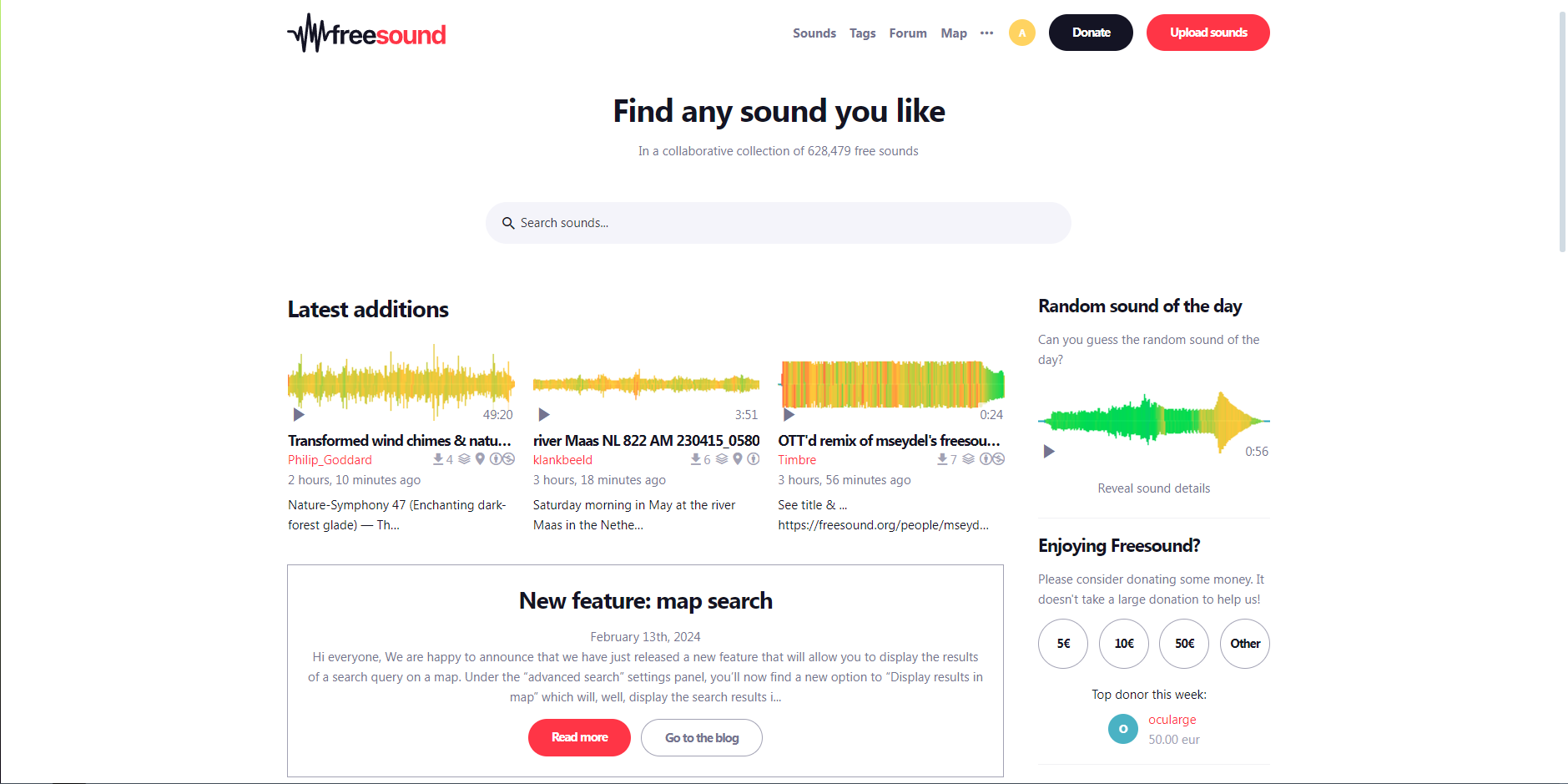
- Screenshot
- Website type: Audio clip sharing
- Owners: Music Technology Group, Universitat Pompeu Fabra
- Creators: Bram de Jong, Freesound Team
- Website: freesound.org
- Commercial: No
- Registration: Yes and required
- Launched: April 5, 2005; 21 years ago
- Current status: Active
- Content license: Creative Commons

Freesound is a collaborative repository of Creative Commons licensed audio samples, and non-profit organisation, with more than 700,000 sounds and effects (as of August 2026), and 8 million registered users (as of March 2019). Sounds are uploaded to the website by its users, and cover a wide range of subjects, from field recordings to synthesised sounds. Audio content in the repository can be tagged and browsed by folksonomic means as well as standard text-based search. Audio content in the repository is also analysed using the open-source audio analysis tool Essentia, which powers the similarity search functionality of the site. Freesound has a RESTful API through which third-party applications can access and retrieve audio content and its metadata.

== Licensing ==
Freesound originally used the CC Sampling Plus license for all samples, but has since switched to using CC0, CC BY, and CC BY-NC. Older samples remain under Sampling Plus unless their uploaders have relicensed them.

All of these licenses allow use and distribution of the samples (modified or unmodified) for non-commercial purposes, and in the case of CC0 and CC BY also for commercial purposes. The Sampling Plus license did not allow unmodified samples to be distributed commercially, and therefore, like CC BY-NC, fails the Definition of Free Cultural Works and the Debian Free Software Guidelines, and is not free enough to be used on Wikipedia, free software programs, and other projects requiring free content.

== Release ==
The Freesound Project was officially launched on April 5, 2005 in the context of the 2005 International Computer Music Conference. It is a project of the Music Technology Group of Universitat Pompeu Fabra, Barcelona. Frederic Font is heading the team responsible for developing and administrating the Freesound website.

Children of Men is the first major motion picture known to legally use a sample from Freesound in its production. The sound used is "male_Thijs_loud_scream.aiff" posted by the user thanvannispen, and the film properly attributes the sample in the credits.

== Features ==
- Metadata tags
- GeoTagging
- Sample packs
- Remix tree
- Similarity search
- Sound Bookmarks
- Forum
- Follow users and tags
- Waveform display
- HTML5/Flash preview
- RESTful API
- CC licensing

The features of Freesound are designed to make the sound files on the website easy to index, search, and browse. Since the licenses used (except CC0) stipulate that the authors of the original work must be credited in the derivative work, the site is capable of automatically generating an attribution list to make this easier.

== Software architecture ==
The Freesound platform is based on technology developed by the Music Technology Group of the Pompeu Fabra University, Barcelona.

- Similarity searches based on automatically extracted audio features using Essentia audio analysis tool.
- Spectral centroid waveform display

The following web technologies are also used:

- Python scripting
- PostgreSQL database
- Apache Solr text search
