= Xavier Serra =

American music computing researcher

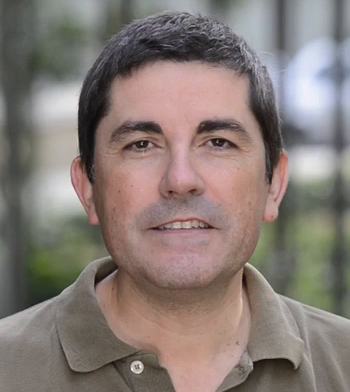
Xavier Serra in 2014

Xavier Serra (born September 10, 1959) is a researcher in the field of Sound and Music Computing and professor at the Pompeu Fabra University (UPF) in Barcelona. He is the founder and director of the Music Technology Group at the UPF.

== Life and education ==
Xavier Serra was born in Barcelona (Catalonia, Spain) and from a very young age he maintained a dual interest in music and science. He started musical studies when he was 11 years old, studying classical guitar and cello at the Conservatory of Barcelona (graduated in guitar in 1981) and then he combined those studies with the studies of Biology at the University of Barcelona (BSc in Biology in 1981).

After completing his undergraduate education and with a scholarship from a Catalan bank, he continued his studies in the USA. He did a Master in Music at Florida State University (graduated with honours in 1983), where he was able to combine music performance with a formal education in computer music in one of the few centres that at that time offered this possibility. In 1983 he obtained a Fulbright scholarship to do a PhD and was accepted at Stanford University to work at the Center for Computer Research in Music and Acoustics (CCRMA), specializing in audio signal processing for music applications. At CCRMA, he studied with pioneers in the field like John Chowning, Max Mathews and Julius Smith. Xavier Serra obtained his PhD in 1989 with a thesis entitled: A System for Sound Analysis/Transformation/Synthesis based on a Deterministic plus Stochastic Decomposition. Out of the thesis, Stanford University obtained a patent and a number of relevant academic articles were published. Serra's thesis was recognized as an important contribution to the field of Sound and Music Computing, being cited by several hundred academic publications in the next few years and obtaining wide recognition from the research community.

== Career ==
After obtaining the PhD, Xavier Serra was hired by the Japanese company Yamaha at a research centre that the company established in California, Yamaha Music Technologies. There he continued for two years his research on audio processing applied to sound synthesis, working especially with the singing voice.

In 1991 Xavier Serra obtained a grant from the Spanish Government to return to Barcelona with the goal to promote there the field of Sound and Music Computing. He became the executive director of Phonos Foundation and from that position, he promoted new education and research initiatives. He joined the Universitat Pompeu Fabra in 1994 and established the Music Technology Group. He also helped in creating the Escola Superior de Music de Catalunya, where he established the Department of Sonology.

As head of the Music Technology Group of the UPF, Xavier Serra has been behind most of the accomplishments of the group, such as Vocaloid, Freesound.org, BMAT, and Reactable. He has also been very active in promoting initiatives in the field of Sound and Music Computing at the international level, being editor and reviewer of a number of journals, conferences and research programs of the European Commission, and giving lectures on current and future challenges of the field.

=== CompMusic: A multicultural approach to Music Computing ===
In 2010 Xavier Serra was awarded an Advanced Grant from the European Research Council to carry out the project CompMusic (Computational models for the discovery of the world's music). The main goal of CompMusic is to advance in the field of Music Computing by approaching a number of the current research challenges from a multicultural perspective. It aims to advance in the description and formalization of music, making it more accessible to computational approaches and reducing the gap between audio signal descriptions and semantically meaningful music concepts. It intends to develop information modelling techniques applicable to non-western music repertories and formulate computational models to represent culture-specific music contexts. CompMusic approaches these research challenges by (1) combining methodologies from disciplines such as Information Processing, Computational Musicology, Music Cognition and Human-Computer Interaction, and (2) analyzing a variety of music information sources such as audio features, symbolic scores, text commentaries, user evaluations, etc. from some of the major non-western art-music traditions in North-India (Hindustani) South-India (Carnatic), Turkey (Ottoman), Maghreb (Andalusian) and China (Beijing Opera). CompMusic wants to challenge the current western centred information paradigms, advance our Information Technologies research, and contribute to our rich multicultural society.
