= Mayte Gómez =

Mayte Gómez may refer to:

- Mayte Gómez Macanás (born 1984), Spanish singer
- Mayte Gómez Molina (born 1993), Spanish artist and writer
