= Zalaquett =

Zalaquett is a surname of lebanese origin, from the city of Zahle. Other variations are "Zalakett", "Zalaket", "Zalaquet" and "Eslait". Notable people with the surname include:

- José Zalaquett (born 1970), Chilean lawyer
- Pablo Zalaquett (born 1963), Chilean lawyer
- Valeria Zalaquett (born 1971), Chilean photographer
