= Sagnier =

Sagnier is a surname. Notable people with the surname include:

- Enric Sagnier (1858–1931), Spanish architect
- Eugenio Trías Sagnier (1942–2013), Spanish philosopher
- Ludivine Sagnier (born 1979), French actress and model
