= Berta García Faet =

Spanish writer (born 1988)

Berta García Faet (born 1988, Valencia) is a Spanish poet, translator, and scholar of Hispanic Literature.

== Life and work ==
Berta García Faet has published nine books of poetry in Spanish, most recently Corazonada in 2023, Una pequeña personalidad linda in 2021, and in 2018, Corazón tradicionalista. Poesía 2008-2011, all with La Bella Varsovia, edited by Elena Medel. García Faet is also the author of the books Los salmos fosforitos (Fluorescent Psalms, La Bella Varsovia, 2017), La edad de merecer (The Eligible Age, La Bella Varsovia, 2015), Fresa y herida (Strawberry and Wound, Diputación de León, 2011), Introducción a todo (Introduction to Everything, La Bella Varsovia, 2011), Night club para alumnas aplicadas (Nightclub for Studious Schoolgirls, Vitruvio, 2009), and Manojo de abominaciones (A Bunch of Abominations, Ayuntamiento de Avilés, 2008).

García Faet is also the author of the essay El arte de encender las palabras (The Art of Igniting Words, Barlin, 2023). The book is a meditation on the art of poetry.

She has won the following prizes: Premio TodosTusLibros 2023; Miguel Hernández National Youth Poetry Award, 2018; Premio Nacional de Poesía "Antonio González de Lama," 2010; IV Premio de Poesía Joven "Pablo García Baena," 2011; VII Premio Nacional de Poesía "Ciega de Manzanares," 2009; XVI Premio de Poesía "Ana de Valle," 2008.

García Faet has studied at the University of Valencia, Pompeu Fabra University, and the City College of New York; she holds a PhD in Hispanic Studies from Brown University.

== Translation into other languages ==
The Eligible Age is an English translation of García Faet's La edad de merecer by U.S. American translator Kelsi Vanada. Unai Velasco calls it "one of the most significant books of the last few years...Berta García Faet has become the most representative voice of her generation." The first of García Faet's books to be translated into English, The Eligible Age was published by independent press Song Bridge Press in 2018.

In a review of the translation, reviewer Laura Wetherington writes, "The Eligible Age does not disappoint, which is to say it's equally complex, surprising, and funny."

Various poems from Una pequeña personalidad linda have been published in Vanada's English translation in literary journals, including Chicago Review, American Chordata, and the Action Books blog.

== Bibliography ==
- Manojo de abominaciones, 2008
- Night club para alumnas aplicadas, 2009
- Introducción a todo, 2011
- Fresa y herida, 2011
- La edad de merecer, 2015
- Los salmos fosforitos, 2017
- Corazón tradicionalista. Poesía 2008-2011, 2018
- The Eligible Age, 2018 (in English)
- Una pequeña personalidad linda, 2021
- Corazonada, 2023
- El arte de encender las palabras, 2023 (nonfiction)
