= Antonio Briceño =

Venezuelan photographer

Antonio Briceño (born 5 December 1966) is a Venezuelan photographer and activist for environmental issues, ethnic minorities, and human rights. He has a graduate degree in biology from the Central University of Venezuela and a master's degree in Digital Arts from the Pompeu Fabra University. He is the co-founder of the conservationist nongovernmental organization PROVITA.

== Biography ==
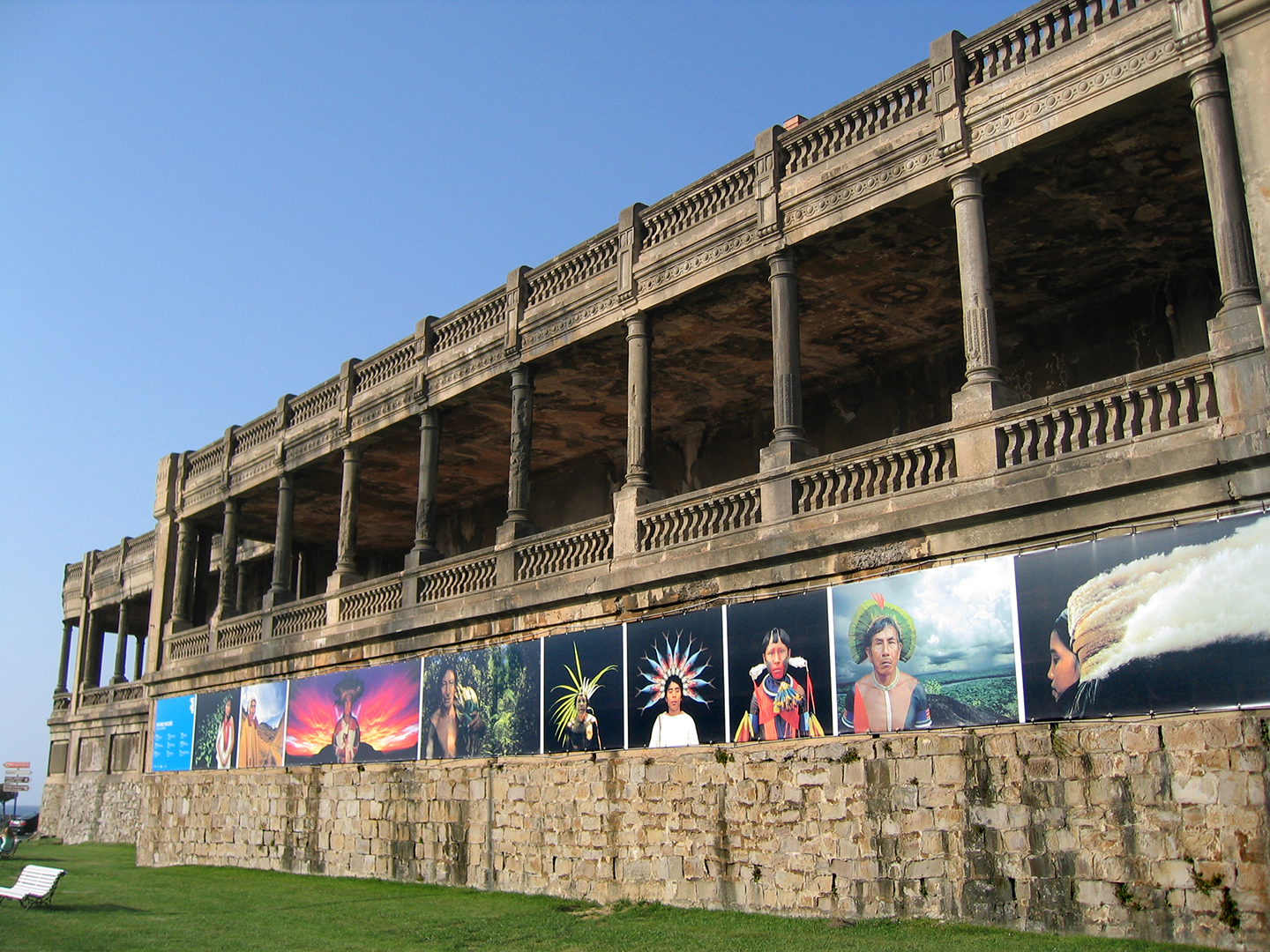
Gods of America, Getxophoto, Getxo, Spain.

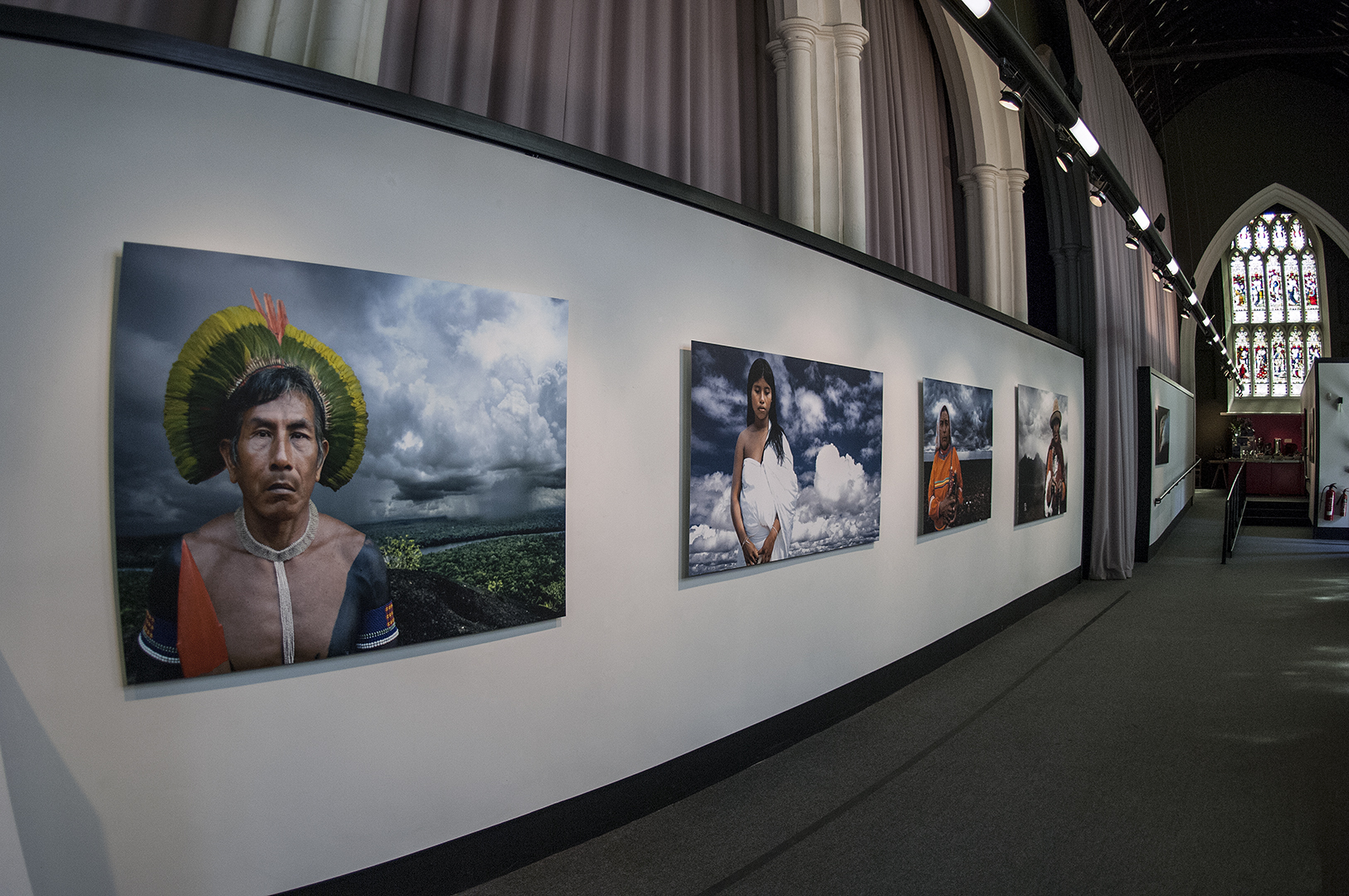
Gods of America, Salisbury, UK.

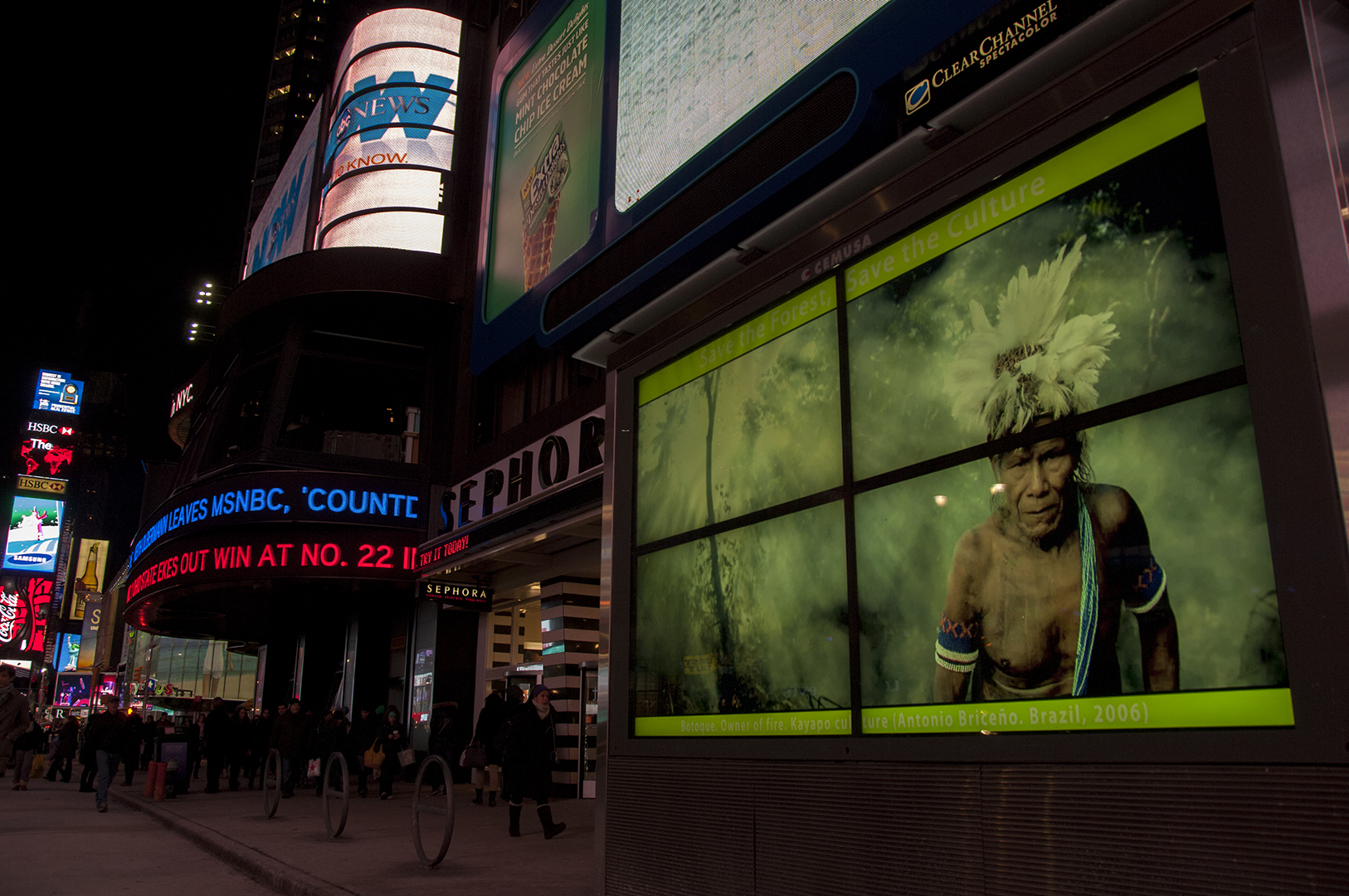
Gods of America. Save the forest. Save the culture, Times Square, New York, USA.

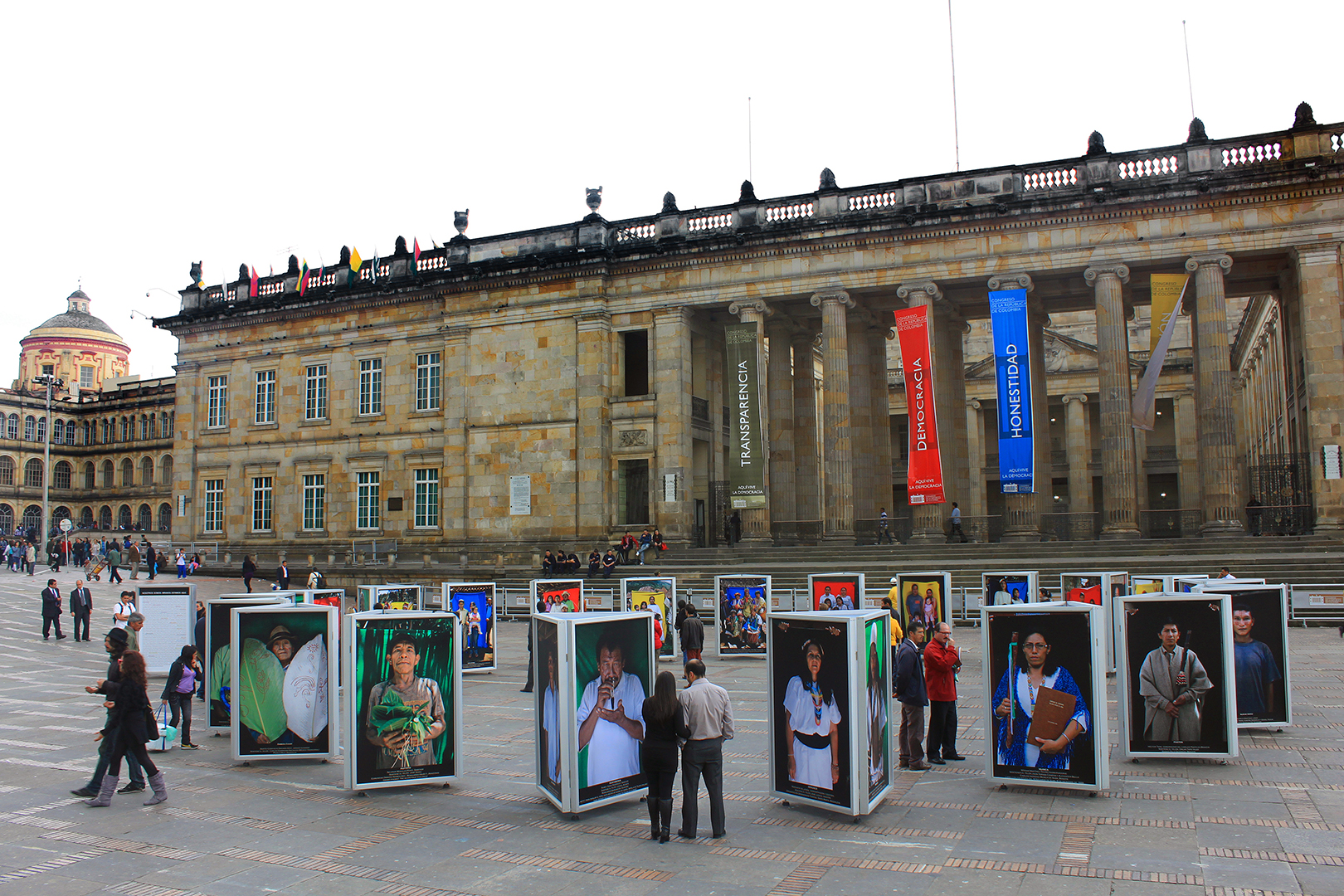
Look at us. Here we are, Bolívar Square, Bogota, Colombia.

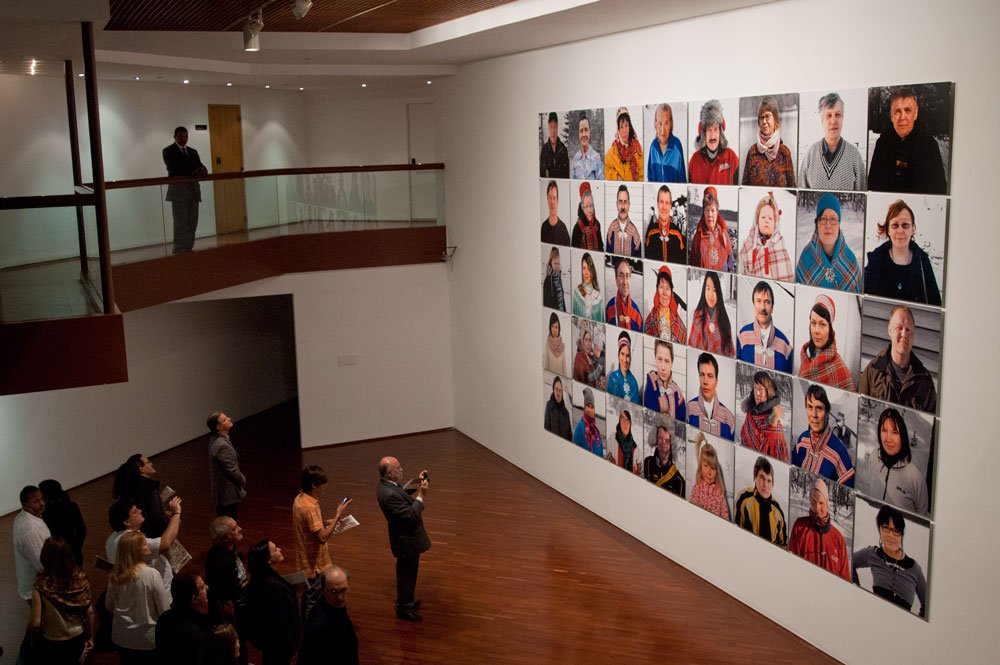
520 Reindeer, BOD Corpbanca, Caracas, Venezuela.

Briceño was born in Caracas, Venezuela. His passion for photography began when he was a teenager. He first exhibited his work in 1987. Between 1996 and 2002, he carried out several solo exhibitions, relating to the following topics: Veils and Turbans (1996, Lalit Kala Akademi, New Delhi); Passengers (a series that won him First Prize in the Luis Felipe Toro Prize and which was exhibited in Caracas' Museum of Fine Arts in 1997); Devotion (a series that depicts different forms of popular religious beliefs in Venezuela, which was shown at Galería Los Talleres, Mexico in 1998; in Casa de las Américas, Havana, 1999; and at Maison Internationale, Brussels in 2000); Guadalupanos (Ateneo de Caracas, 1999); and The Shamans (Galerie Adriana Schmidt, Stuttgart, 2002).

Between 2001 and 2007, he worked on the project entitled Gods of America: Natural Pantheon, in which he used digital photomontage (carried out during long-term periods of field research), creating a pantheon of deities and mythological beings from indigenous cultures across the American continent. This project covered ten cultures from six countries: Huichol (Mexico 2001), Piaroa (Venezuela 2002), Kogui and Wiwa (Colombia 2003), Wayuu (Venezuela 2005), Kuna (Panama 2005), Quero (Peru 2005), Kayapó (Brazil 2006), and Ye'kuana and Pemón (Venezuela 2007). He received several grants to fund the project, including grants from the Programa de Intercambio de Residencias Artísticas (Grupo de los Tres G3), the Estancia para Creación Artística Grant (Government of Mexico) and the Apoyo a Artistas Grant, (Centro Nacional de las Artes, Mexico).

Gods of America represented Venezuela at the 52nd Venice Biennale (2007) and have been exhibited, in either solo or group shows, in Finland, France, Hungary, Sweden, Germany, the United Kingdom, Spain, the United States, Mexico, Colombia, New Zealand and Venezuela. The artist received the Green Leaf Award for Artistic Excellence 2008, awarded by the Natural World Museum and the United Nations Environment Program, in addition to various other prizes.

In 2008, Briceño carried out a project entitled The Tree, in which he photographed the New Zealand Maori's worship of forefathers. Afterwards, in 2009, the Colombian Ministry of Culture invited him to create a series about indigenous groups in Colombia, which resulted in the exhibit Look at us. Here we are in Bogotá and other cities around Colombia.

The same year he was invited by the Government of Finland and the Sámi Parliament of Finland to carry out the project 520 Reindeer. A homage to Sàmi language, which depicts the richness and importance of the languages of the Sámi, the last surviving indigenous people in Western Europe. This series has been exhibited in Venezuela and in Finland, and one of its main pieces was presented at the headquarters of the United Nations in New York during the Indigenous Peoples and Food Sovereignty exhibition. The complete series belongs to the Siida museum in Inari, Finland.

In 2010, the institution Art Works for Change and the United Nations Environment Program invited him to carry out an artistic project on biodiversity in Rwanda, entitled Millions of pieces. One Puzzle. This series was presented on the occasion of the World Environment Day celebrations of 2010, and it was exhibited at the Field Museum in Chicago. Two years later, the artist presented The weepers. Our last tears (hired female mourners), a series consecrated to the repression of emotions, so characteristic of our contemporary culture, produced entirely in northern Peru. That same year, he received the 2011 International Association of Art Critics Award for his outstanding career and commitment to the expression of a poetics of respect for the planet, its inhabitants and its cultures.

In 2014, Briceño presented the series Omertà on oil. The era of silence, a video installation consisting on several video-portraits of victims of torture and other forms of disproportionate use of force by the military and paramilitary groups controlled by the government of Nicolas Maduro, during the civil protest and demonstrations that took place on February and March of that same year. Furthermore, his last series to this day, The skin of Mars, reflects on the violence of war through the overlapping of images of planet Mars taken by NASA and pictures of as many sculptures of the homonymous god that rest in the collections of art museums around the world.
