= Alba Cid =

Spanish poet and researcher (born 1989)

- Born: Alba Cid Fernández; March 10, 1989 (age 37); Ourense, Galicia, Spain
- Education: University of Santiago de Compostela
- Occupations: Poet; researcher
- Notable work: Atlas (2019)

Alba Cid Fernández (born 10 March 1989) is a Spanish poet and researcher who writes in Galician. She previously taught Galician at the University of Oxford; her first solo collection, Atlas (2019), won the 2020 Miguel Hernández National Youth Poetry Award.

== Early life and education ==
Cid was born in Ourense on 10 March 1989. She graduated in Galician philology from the University of Santiago de Compostela in 2012, also taking second-cycle studies in Portuguese philology and Romance philology; she then pursued a master's degree in theoretical and comparative studies of literature and culture and held collaboration scholarships in a university department and its Linguistic Normalisation Service. Her early literary prizes included the Rosalía de Castro de Cornellà in 2006 and 2008 and the Minerva in 2007.

== Career ==
Cid contributed to Poética da casa (2006) and the anthology No seu despregar (2016), published creative writing and reviews in Grial, Luzes, Tempos Novos and Dorna, and worked as a contributor to Radio Galega. She also sat on the editorial board of Dorna and, in January 2020, managed the John Rutherford Centre for Galician Studies at the University of Oxford.

=== Atlas ===
Published by Galaxia in 2019, Atlas was Cid's first solo poetry collection; writing in elDiario.es, Daniel Salgado described its long, sometimes narrative verse and its range of references, from Wallace Stevens and John Ashbery to Inuit bone maps and the Asmat of Western Papua. Cid said she assembled the collection from poems and a closing essay written over about five years; its sections cover five continents and a polar region, while engravings, postcards and Polynesian navigation charts form part of its visual material. On 20 October 2020, Atlas won the National Young Poetry Prize Miguel Hernández, which carried a €20,000 award; the jury described the book as a reflection on how literature maps reality and on the moral value of literature as a way of questioning the world.

Cid's Spanish translation of Atlas was published by La Bella Varsovia on 4 September 2024. Reviewing that edition in Babelia, Maria do Cebreiro placed Cid in a line of poets who do not separate poetry from thought, and discussed the book's relationship between words and images and its references to W. G. Sebald and Ludwig Wittgenstein. A review in El Asombrario compared the collection to a cabinet of curiosities and reported that the Galician version had reached six editions.

=== English translations and later work ===
Jacob Rogers's English translation of Cid's poem "An Apocryphal History of the Discovery of Migration" was one of four winners of the inaugural Poems in Translation Contest in 2019, organised by Words Without Borders and the Academy of American Poets; the winning poems were selected from more than 700 entries translated from 55 languages and published in Poem-a-Day and Words Without Borders. In March 2021, Words Without Borders published "Essays, or the Opening and Closing of the Okra Flowers During the Eclipse" in an English translation by Megan Berkobien and Rogers, accompanied by Cid's photographs.

Cid also collaborated with the Clube Espeleolóxico Maúxo on Tesouro espeleolóxico galego, writing the opening essay "Unha memoria ilustrada do inframundo" and an interview with the club; the book brings together natural, geological, historical and ethnographic material about caves in Galicia, border regions and sites connected with Galicians elsewhere.
