= Gloria Aura Bortolini =

Italian television presenter

- Born: January 27, 1982 (age 44); Treviso, Italy
- Education: Pompeu Fabra University
- Occupations: filmmaker; journalist; writer
- Years active: 2007–present
- Television: Londra – Linea Greenwich (RAI 3)
- Website: gloriaaurabortolini.com

Gloria Aura Bortolini (born January 27, 1982) is an Italian television presenter and documentary filmmaker.

== Early life and education ==
Bortolini was born in Treviso, Italy. She graduated from Pompeu Fabra University in 2007 with a degree in economics and a master’s degree in marketing and communication.

== Career ==
Following graduation, she worked as a journalist. After two years in Brazil and Argentina, she moved to London. Her 2015 film, London afloat, was shown at several film festivals.

She hosted a television series, Londra, linea Greenwich, a program about London's fashion scene, on Kilimangiaro - Come è piccolo il mondo for RAI 3. She presented a vlog, Glorious Postcards, on YouTube.

One of Bortolini’s photographs won an award in 2013 at the Sony World Photography Awards.

== Works ==
Filmography

- The two stories of Adamà (2010) ( assistant director)
- Non ho paura ( 2010) ( camera assistant)
- The lane ( 2011) (director)
- Autrefois (2012) (assistant director, producer)
- Luoghi comuni, little migrating stories (2013) (Video journalist)
- The daily Lidia ( 2013) (second camera)
- Leoni (2013) (assistant director)
- Lei è mio marito – she is my husband (2013) ( co-director, co-author)
- Alle falde del Kilimangiaro (2014) (author, TV presenter)
- Facing (2015) (researcher, co-author)
- Metropolis, Travel Channel (2015) (TV presenter)
- London afloat (2015) (director, author)
- (con)fine (2016) (director, author)
- Out of the blue (2016) (director)

Photography

- 1 day 6 cities (2011)
- è Africa (2013)
- East end, photobook (2013)
- Press Freedom (2015)

Writing

- Malta, Capital (2011)
- Pernambuco, Il Mondo (2011)
- Argentina, Il Mondo (2011)
- Brazil, fDi Financial Times (2011)
