= Marta Rosique =

Spanish politician (born 1996)

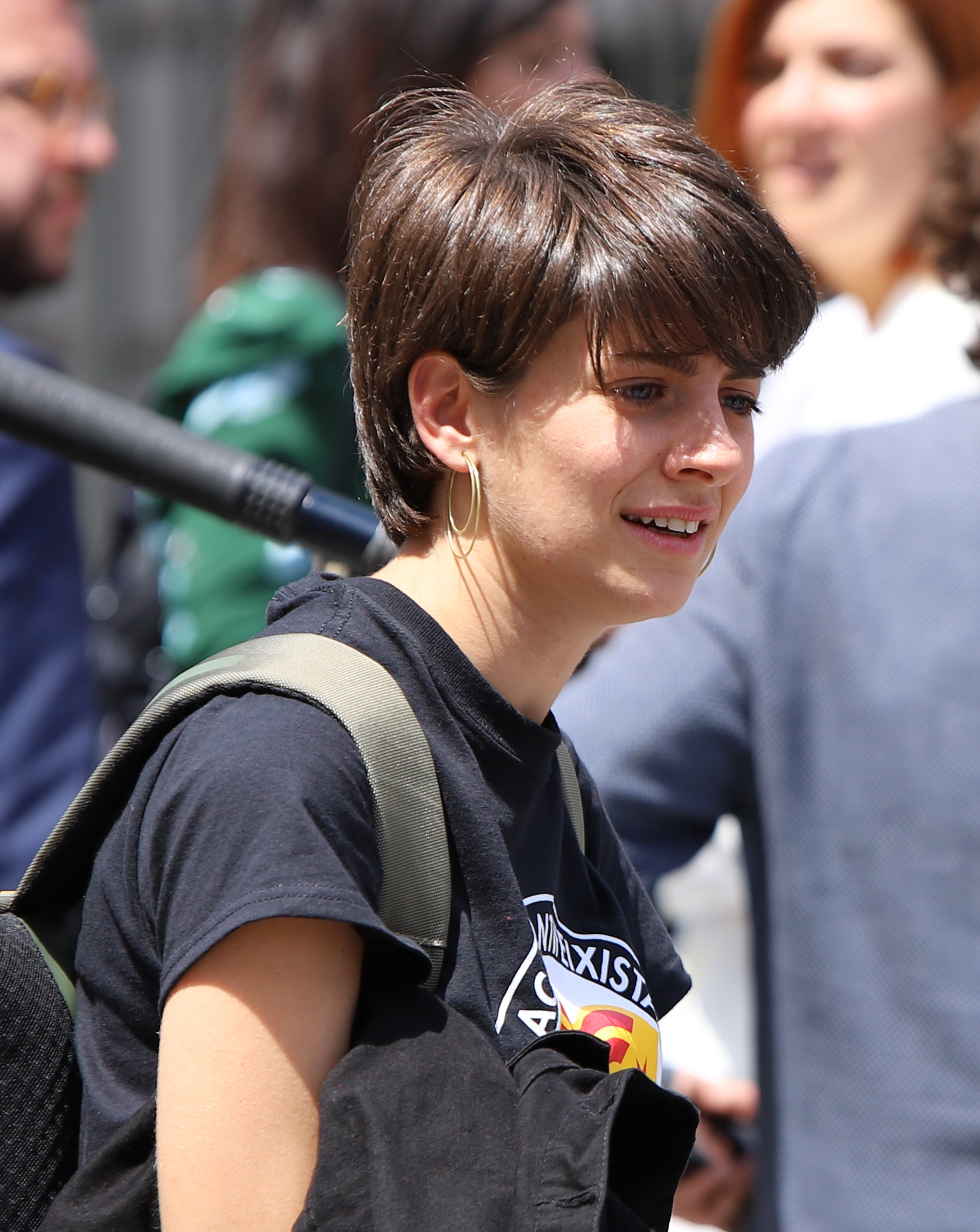
- Rosique in May 2019

Member of the Congress of Deputies of Spain
- Incumbent
- Assumed office 16 May 2019
- Constituency: Barcelona

Personal details
- Born: Marta Rosique i Saltor; 16 March 1996 (age 30) Barcelona, Catalonia, Spain
- Citizenship: Spanish
- Party: Republican Left of Catalonia
- Other political affiliations: Republican Left of Catalonia–Sovereigntists
- Education: Pompeu Fabra University

Marta Rosique i Saltor (born 16 March 1996) is a Catalan politician from Spain and a member of the Congress of Deputies of Spain.

== Early life ==
Rosique was born on 16 March 1996 in Barcelona, Catalonia. Her father is a doctor and her mother works for a food security company. She lives in the wealthy Sant Gervasi district of Barcelona. She has a degree in journalism from the Pompeu Fabra University and is currently studying political science at the university.

Rosique was a member of the European Youth Parliament from 2011 to 2015. She was secretary of the National Youth Council of Catalonia (CNJC) between 2015 and 2017, with responsibility for international co-operation and interculturality. In this role she helped found the Euromed Youth Network, a platform for youth organisations in the Mediterranean region. She has been Republican Youth of Catalonia's secretary for policy and international co-operation since 2016. In 2017, prior to the Catalan independence referendum, she was spokesperson for Universitats per la República (UxR), a platform that mobilised support amongst the university community for Catalan self-determination.

== Career ==
Rosique contested the April 2019 general election as a Republican Left of Catalonia–Sovereigntists electoral alliance candidate in the Province of Barcelona and was elected to the Congress of Deputies. Aged 23, she was the youngest member of the congress to date and had a net wealth of €150. She was re-elected at the November 2019 general election.

== Electoral history ==
Electoral history of Marta Rosique
Election	Constituency	Party	Alliance	No.	Result
2019 April general	Province of Barcelona	Republican Left of Catalonia	Republican Left of Catalonia–Sovereigntists	7	Elected
2019 November general	Province of Barcelona	Republican Left of Catalonia	Republican Left of Catalonia–Sovereigntists	6	Elected
