= Jaume Casals =

Catalan philosopher

- Born: 1958 (age 67–68); Barcelona, Spain
- Education: Autonomous University of Barcelona
- Scientific career
- Fields: Philosophy
- Workplaces: Autonomous University of Barcelona; Paris Diderot University
- Thesis: The philosophy of Montaigne (1984)

Jaume Casals Pons (born 1958) is the professor of philosophy at Pompeu Fabra University since 2003. He received his Doctorate in Philosophy summa cum laude from the Autonomous University of Barcelona in 1984; prior to teaching at UPF, he taught at the Autonomous University of Barcelona and Paris Diderot University.

Casals is a senior fellow of the Institut d'Estudis Catalans. He was the Academic Board Chairman and Executive Vice-President of the UPF's Continuing Education Institute (IDEC) as well as its vice-rector for postgraduate and doctoral studies between 2001 and 2005; he was also editor-in-chief of L'Avenç between 2000 and 2001.

Jaume was rector of UPF between 3 May 2013 and 2021; he was replaced by Orol Amat on 5 May 2021.

== Publications ==
=== Books ===
- La filosofia de Montaigne. Barcelona: Edicions 62, 1986. 320 pages.
- L'experiment d'Aristòtil. Literatura d'una incursió en la metafísica. Barcelona: Edicions 62, 1992. 110 pages.
- El pou de la paraula. Una història de la saviesa grega. Barcelona: Edicions 62, 1996. 101 pages.
- El aprendizaje de la muerte en la historia de las ideas. Santiago de Chile: Ediciones UDP, 2010. 172 pages.

=== Translations ===
- MONTAIGNE, M. de. Apologia de Ramon Sibiuda. Barcelona: Laia, 1982. (Textos Filosòfics). [P. Lluís Font, Ed.; J. C. P., translation into Catalan].
- MONTESQUIEU, Ch. baron de. Cartes perses. Barcelona: Laia, 1984. (Textos Filosòfics). [J. Ramoneda, Ed.; J. C. P., translation into Catalan].
- MONTAIGNE, M. de. Diario de viaje a Italia. Barcelona: Península, 1986. (Nexos). [Introduction, translation into Spanish and notes by J. C. P., cf. supra].
- BERGSON, H. Assaig sobre les dades immediates de la consciència, seguit de la intuïció filosòfica. Barcelona: Edicions 62, 1991. (Textos Filosòfics). 284 pages [Introduction, translation into Catalan, notes and edition by J. C. P., cf. supra].

=== Significant articles ===
- "Història dels atomismes i astúcia de les tenebres". Saber, 2. Barcelona, 1980, pp. 30–34
- "Kant: somnis d'un visionari i Assaig sobre les magnituds negatives (comentari)". Enrahonar, 4. Bellaterra, 1982, pp. 37–45.
- "La paradoxa dels mons possibles". Enrahonar, 7/8. Bellaterra, 1984, pp. 39–41.
- "Història ideal de Jacques le fataliste". Enrahonar, 12. Bellaterra, 1985, pp. 81–85.
- "La filosofia obligatòria". Arrel, 17. Barcelona, 1987, pp. 50–55.
- "Llibres prohibits", in: COL·LEGI DE FILOSOFIA. Frontera i perill. Barcelona: Edicions 62, 1987.
- "Le kantisme esthétique de Montaigne". Bulletin de la Société des Amis de Montaigne. VII série, 11-12. Paris, 1988, pp. 87–94.
- "El temps en la filosofia de Bergson". Enrahonar, 15. Bellaterra: UAB, 1988, pp. 21–37.
- "Sur le second degré de l'Apologie", in: BLUM, Cl. (ed.). Montaigne. Apologie de Raimond Sebond. De la Theologia à la Théologie. Paris/Geneva: Librairie Honoré Champion/Éditions Slatkine, 1990, pp. 187–200.
- "Trois incursions de Montaigne dans la métaphysique", in: BLUM, Cl. (ed.). Montaigne, penseur et philosophe. Paris/Geneva: Librairie Honoré Champion/Éditions Slatkine, 1990, pp. 45–52.
- "La moral de la Enciclopedia", in: CAMPS, V. (ed.). Historia de la ética. Vol. II. La ética moderna. Barcelona: Crítica, 1992, pp. 168–193.
- "La théologie de Montaigne? Ou que Dieu n'existe pas dans les Essais". Bulletin de la Société des Amis de Montaigne, VII série, 33-34. Paris, 1993, pp. 149–155.
- "Les tesis de filosofia de la història de W. Benjamin", in: LLOVET, J. (ed.). Homenatge a Walter Benjamin. Barcelona: Barcanova, 1993.
- "Problèmes d'un philosophe pour devenir cannibale", in: Montaigne et le nouveau monde. Special issue of Bulletin de la Société des Amis de Montaigne, VII série, 39-30-31-32. Paris, 1992-1993, pp. 143–152.
- "A note on the use of aitia and aition in the Metaphysics of Aristotle". Rivista di Cultura Classica e Medioevale, 1, Year XXXVII. Rome, 1995, pp. 89–95. [In collaboration with J. Hernández Reynés]. [Also published in: GÓMEZ PIN, V. (ed.). Actas del Primer Congreso Internacional de Ontología. Enrahonar Monografies. Bellaterra: Publicacions de la Universitat Autònoma de Barcelona, 1994, pp. 91–94]. "Qu'est-ce qu'un voyage?". In: SAMARAS, Z. (ed.). Montaigne. Espace, écriture. Paris/Geneva: Librairie Honoré Champion/Éditions Slatkine, 1995.
- "Adviser et derriere et devant. Transition de l'histoire à la philosophie dans le Discours de la servitude volontaire". Corpus, 28. "La philosophie de l'histoire dans la Renaissance". Paris: Desan, Ph. ed., 1995, pp. 103–112.
- "La présomption et l'espérance", in: TETEL, M. (ed.). Actes du Colloque international de Duke, "Marie de Gournay et l'édition 1595 des Essais de Montaigne", March 1995. Special issue of The Journal of Medieval and Renaissance Studies. Vol. 25, 3, 1995, pp. 511–515.
- "Amphibologie et défauts théoriques dans le débat sur l'édition des Essais de Montaigne", in: ARNOULD, J.-CL. (ed.). Actes du Colloque de Paris "Editer Montaigne". Paris: Bulletin de la Société des Amis de Montaigne, 1996, pp. 69–78.
- "Tot el que veritablement passa em passa a mi", in: GÓMEZ PIN, V. (ed.). "Descartes. Lo racional y lo real". Enrahonar, special issue. Bellaterra, 1999, pp. 505–510. [In collaboration with J. Hernández Reynés].
- "Camino arriba, camino abajo. De Aristóteles a Heráclito", in: GÓMEZ PIN, V. (ed.). Physis. 3rd International Ontology Congress, Ontology Studies, 1. Paris: PUF, 2000, pp. 325–335. [In collaboration with J. Hernández Reynés].
- "Sur la double racine du principe de la servitude volontaire", in: LAFARGA, F.; SEGARRA, M. (eds.). Renaissance et classicisme. Barcelona: PPU, 2004.
- "¿Se puede aprender lo que se da de antemano? 1. Sobre las matemáticas y su origen". Ontology Studies: Cuadernos de Ontología, 5-6, 2006, pp. 197–206. ISSN 1576-2270. [In collaboration with J. Hernández Reynés and J. Olesti].
- "Sur le lieu-commun 'Philosophie et littérature'. Un éclaircissement". Revue de Métaphysique et de Morale. Paris. [In press].
- "La tête de Socrate", in: FASSEUR, V.; GUERRIER, O.; JENNY, L.; TOURNON, A. (ed.). Éveils (Études en honneur de Jean-Yves Pouilloux). Paris: Éditions Classiques Garnier, Études Montaignistes, 56, 2010, pp. 137–142.
- "La mort de La Boétie". Bulletin de la Société Internationale des Amis de Montaigne, 55. Paris: Classiques Garnier, 2012, pp. 37–43.
