= Míriam Hatibi =

Data analyst and activist in Barcelona, Catalonia, Spain

Míriam Hatibi (b. Barcelona, 1993) is a data analyst and activist. She has been a spokesperson for the Ibn Battuta Foundation and is an active member of the Muslim community.

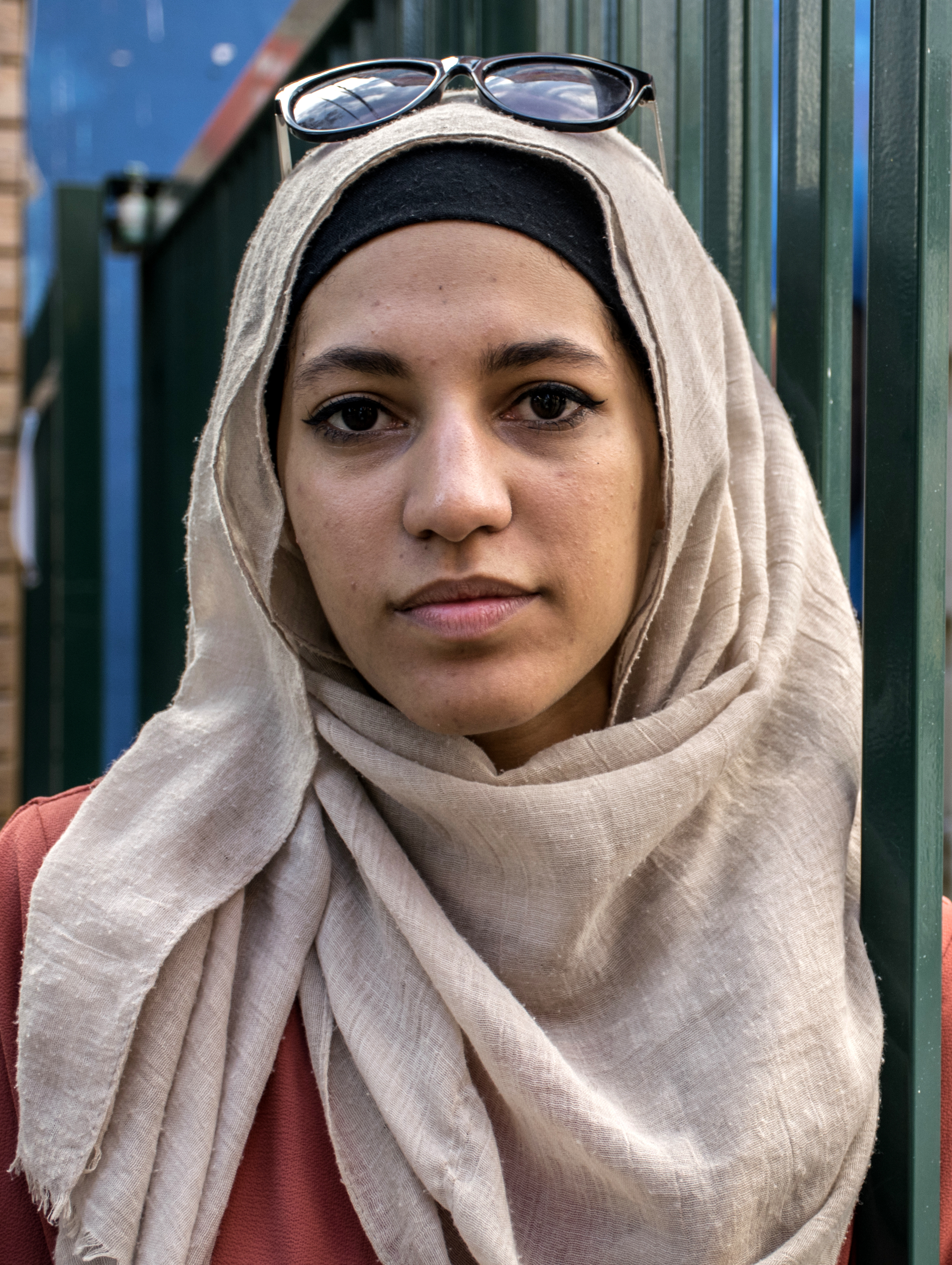
Míriam Hatibi

== Early life ==
She is the daughter of Moroccan parents. Hatibi was born in Barcelona and raised in Bellpuig. She studied International Business Economics at Pompeu Fabra University and earned a postgraduate degree in Internationalization at the University of Barcelona. She works as an analyst in a communication agency, involved with data mining in social media networks.

== Career ==
Hatibi speaks out about the lack of media representation of women and especially of the daughters of immigrants, advocating for representation, including within Western feminism (which she describes as 'hegemonic'), that does not stereotype Muslim women and that is more pluralistic.

Between December 2014 and June 2020, she has been the spokesperson for the Ibn Battuta Foundation (FIB), an entity created to promote sociocultural exchange and the dissemination of scientific knowledge between Morocco and Spain.

Following the August 2017 terrorist attacks in Barcelona and Cambrils, Míriam vehemently condemned terrorism at a demonstration in Plaça de Catalunya that brought together hundreds of Muslims. As a spokesperson for the FIB, she was chosen to read a manifesto in the demonstration that took place in Barcelona on August 26 of the same year.
