= Ángela Segovia =

Spanish poet and researcher

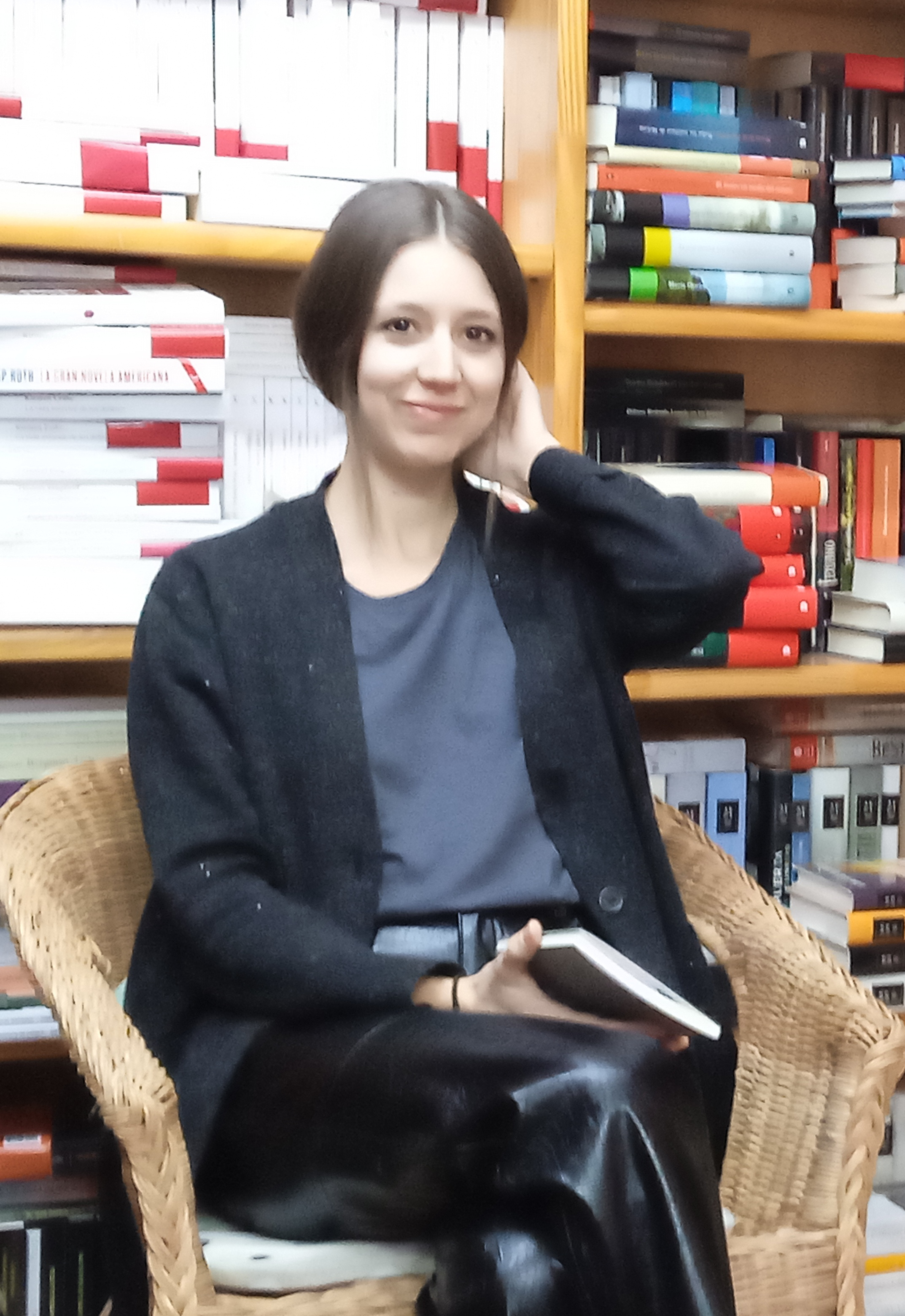
- Born: Ángela Segovia Soriano; 1987 (age 38–39); Las Navas del Marqués, Spain
- Education: Complutense University of Madrid; Autonomous University of Barcelona
- Occupation: Poet
- Awards: Miguel Hernández National Youth Poetry Award (2017)

Ángela Segovia Soriano (born 1987) is a Spanish poet and researcher, the winner of the 2017 Miguel Hernández National Youth Poetry Award.

== Biography ==
Segovia was born and spent her adolescence in the town of Las Navas del Marqués, where her parents ran a bakery. She took to reading Cortázar, which gave her a taste for the avant-garde. At age 14, she began to read poetry intensively while walking through the pine forests, and while still in high school she wrote her first poem as a class assignment. She moved to Madrid to study advertising at the Complutense University, and in 2007 she published her first collection of poems, ¿Te duele?, which won the 5th Félix Grande National Youth Poetry Award in 2009. Later, she graduated with a degree in Theory of Literature and Comparative Literature at the same university.

During a stay in Paris, she began work on her second book, de paso a la ya tan, which she published in 2013. That year, she completed a master's degree in Literary and Cultural Studies at the Autonomous University of Barcelona. In 2014, she began a trip to Peru and Chile to get to know Latin American poetry firsthand. Back in Spain, in 2015, she received a creative grant from the Residencia de Estudiantes, and there she finished her third collection of poems that she had started during her stay in Santiago, La curva se volvió barricada. This book was described by critics as "singular", and won the 2017 Miguel Hernández National Youth Poetry Award, given by the Ministry of Education, Culture and Sports and endowed with 20,000 euros. According to the jury, it was awarded "for representing the opening of Spanish poetry towards new paths that build bridges with new forms of artistic expression and with Hispano-American poetry."

In addition to poetry, Segovia has made forays into fringe theater with the project Cuarto para niños vivos que no quisieron nacer, with which she participated in the 5th Magalia Alternative Theater Encounters. She created the scenic-poetic investigation pieces Guerra-vacas (Espacio La Nave, Madrid, 2009), El muro esta noche el río eclíptico (Inestable Circle of Tiza, La Tabacalera, Madrid, 2011), Ganas dan decirte muchas (Poetic Intersections Festival, 2015), and Archiva vía metalada (Picnic Sessions, CA2M, Móstoles, 2015).

For several years, she has actively participated in the Euraca Research Seminar on languages and poetry.

In 2017, she translated into Navero (the dialect of Las Navas del Marqués) the poetry collection CO CO CO U by Luz Pichel, originally written in a variant of Galician.

== Poetic works ==
- 2007 – ¿Te duele?, City Council of San Sebastián de los Reyes. 2009 Félix Grande National Youth Poetry Award.
- 2013 – de paso a la ya tan. Ártese Quien Pueda Ediciones.
- 2016 – La curva se volvió barricada. Editorial La Uña Rota. 2017 Miguel Hernández National Youth Poetry Award.
- 2018 – Amor divino. Editorial La Uña Rota.
