= Genís Boadella =

Spanish lawyer and politician

Member of the Congress of Deputies of Spain
- Incumbent
- Assumed office 3 December 2019
- Constituency: Barcelona

Personal details
- Born: Genís Boadella i Esteve; 20 March 1979 (age 47) Barcelona, Catalonia, Spain
- Citizenship: Spanish
- Party: Catalan European Democratic Party
- Other political affiliations: Together for Catalonia
- Education: Pompeu Fabra University
- Occupation: Lawyer

Genís Boadella i Esteve (born 20 March 1979) is a Spanish lawyer and politician from Catalonia, and a member of the Congress of Deputies of Spain.

== Early life ==
Boadella was born on 20 March 1979 in Barcelona, Catalonia. He has a degree in law from the Pompeu Fabra University.

== Career ==
Boadella is a practicing lawyer and a member of the Barcelona Bar Association (ICAB). He was a lawyer in a law firm specialising in labour law and social security from 2000 to 2002. From 2002 to 2007 he was a lawyer and assistant manager of Fundació Catalana Tutelar Aspanias, a foundation for the protection of people with disabilities. Since 2007 he has run his own firm, Boadella Esteve Advocats. He was president of the Young Lawyers Group (GAJ) of ICAB from 2011 to 2013. He was a promoter and first co-ordinator of the group of advisors of the Catalan Association of Executives, Managers and Employers (ACEDE) from 2013 to 2015. He is a member of the Observatory of Private Law of Catalonia.

Boadella was a member of the Partit per la Independència (PI) before joining the Nationalist Youth of Catalonia (JNC) in 2000. He was president of the Sant Martí branch of the Democratic Convergence of Catalonia (CDC) from 2008 to 2016. He is currently a member of the Catalan European Democratic Party (PDeCAT)'s national executive and vice-president of its Barcelona branch. He was a district councillor in Sant Martí from 2009 to 2019 and spokesperson for the Convergence and Union (CiU) in the district from 2013 to 2019. He was a member of the district government commission for public roads, security, prevention and mobility (2011-2015).

At the 2016 general election Boadella was placed 14th on the CDC's list of candidates in the Province of Barcelona but the party only managed to win four seats in the province and as a result he failed to get elected. At the April 2019 general election he was placed fifth on the Together for Catalonia (JuntsxCat) electoral alliance's list of candidates in the Province of Barcelona but the alliance only managed to win three seats in the province and as a result he failed to get elected. He contested the November 2019 general election as a JuntsxCat electoral alliance candidate in the Province of Barcelona and was elected to the Congress of Deputies.

== Electoral history ==
Electoral history of Genís Boadella
Election	Constituency	Party	Alliance	No.	Result
2016 general	Province of Barcelona	Democratic Convergence of Catalonia		14	Not elected
2019 April general	Province of Barcelona	Catalan European Democratic Party	Together for Catalonia	5	Not elected
2019 November general	Province of Barcelona	Catalan European Democratic Party	Together for Catalonia	4	Elected
