= Institut Universitari de Cultura =

Institut Universitari de Cultura (Catalan pronunciation: [instiˈtut uniβəɾsiˈtaɾi ðə kulˈtuɾə]), also known by the acronym IUC, is a school belonging to Pompeu Fabra University, in Barcelona. It was created in 1994 in order to promote interdisciplinary cultural research in the fields of art, philosophy and literature. It's directed by Rafael Argullol. IUC includes the university's Seminar of Slavic Studies, the Seminar of History of Religions, and the Prehistoric Art Research Centre, as well as a number of Humanities postgraduate and doctorate programs. It's closely associated with the Biblioteca Mystica et Philosophica Alois M. Haas, hosted in the Ciutadella Campus of UPF.
