= Lola Tórtola =

Spanish poet (born 1997)

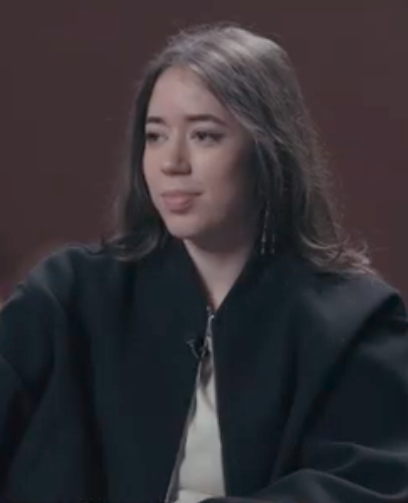
- Born: Dolores Tórtola Hernández; 1997; Murcia, Spain
- Education: University of Murcia; Sapienza University of Rome; Comenius University in Bratislava
- Occupations: Poet; Physician
- Awards: Premio Nacional de Poesía Joven Miguel Hernández (2024)

Dolores Tórtola Hernández (Murcia, 1997), known as Lola Tórtola, is a Spanish poet and physician, winner of the Premio Nacional de Poesía Joven Miguel Hernández 2024.

== Career ==
She was born in Murcia. She graduated in Medicine and began her residency in plastic, aesthetic, and reconstructive surgery at a hospital in Madrid. She studied at the University of Murcia, the Sapienza University of Rome, and Comenius University in Bratislava.

Her poems have appeared in literary journals, such as Ágora-Papeles de Arte Gramático (no. 16) and Mirlo (nos. 6 and 20). One of her poems was selected for the exhibition dedicated to the history of this journal at the Palacio de la Isla in Burgos (2024).

In 2023, she published her first poetry collection, Los dioses destruidos (The Destroyed Gods), thanks to the runner-up prize she received in a poetry competition.

== Recognition ==
Throughout her career as a writer, she has received various awards. In 2022 she received the runner-up prize (accésit) of the Premio Adonáis de Poesía for her work Los dioses destruidos, becoming the first woman from Murcia to achieve this distinction. In September 2024 she was recognized by the Ministry of Culture of Spain with the Premio Nacional de Poesía Joven Miguel Hernández for the same work. The award carries a monetary endowment of 30,000 euros.
