= Miguel Hernández National Youth Poetry Award =

Spanish literary honor

- Named for Miguel Hernández
- Native name: Premio Nacional de Poesía Joven Miguel Hernández
- Awarded for: Poetry
- Sponsored by: Ministry of Culture
- Country: Spain
- First award: 2011
- Website: cultura.gob.es

The Miguel Hernández National Youth Poetry Award (Spanish: Premio Nacional de Poesía Joven Miguel Hernández) is a national literary honor presented by Spain's Ministry of Culture.

== History ==
The award was established in 2010, and its first call for entries took place in 2011. It aims to support young, creative poets by giving them recognition and "providing a first opportunity for the dissemination and enjoyment of their work."

The prize was instituted on the centenary of the birth of the poet Miguel Hernández, and recognizes work published in the previous year by an author under 31 (the age at which Hernández died). Its monetary award, like Spain's other national literary prizes, was initially 20,000 euros. In 2026, this was increased to 30.000 euros.

== Recipients ==
- 2011: Laura Casielles, for Los idiomas comunes
- 2012: Martha Asunción Alonso, for Detener la primavera
- 2013: Unai Velasco, for En este lugar
- 2014: Carlos Loreiro, for Los poemas de Marcelo Aguafuerte. Crónicas para El buey Apis
- 2015: Gonzalo Hermo, for Celebración
- 2016: Constantino Molina Monteagudo, for Las ramas del azar
- 2017: Ángela Segovia, for La curva se volvió barricada
- 2018: Berta García Faet, for Los Salmos Fosforitos
- 2019: Xaime Martínez Menéndez, for Cuerpos perdidos en las morgues
- 2020: Alba Cid, for Atlas
- 2021: María Elena Higueruelo, for Los días eternos
- 2022: Ismael Ramos, for Lixeiro (in Galician, published by Xerais; later translated into Castilian as Ligero, published by La Bella Varsovia)
- 2023: Mayte Gómez Molina, for Los trabajos sin Hércules
- 2024: Lola Tórtola, for Los dioses destruidos
- 2025: Elisa Fernández Guzmán, for Después del pop

== See also ==
- Miguel de Cervantes Prize
- National Poetry Award (Spain)
- Premio de la Crítica Española
- Premio Nacional de las Letras Españolas
