= Diego Comin =

Spanish economist

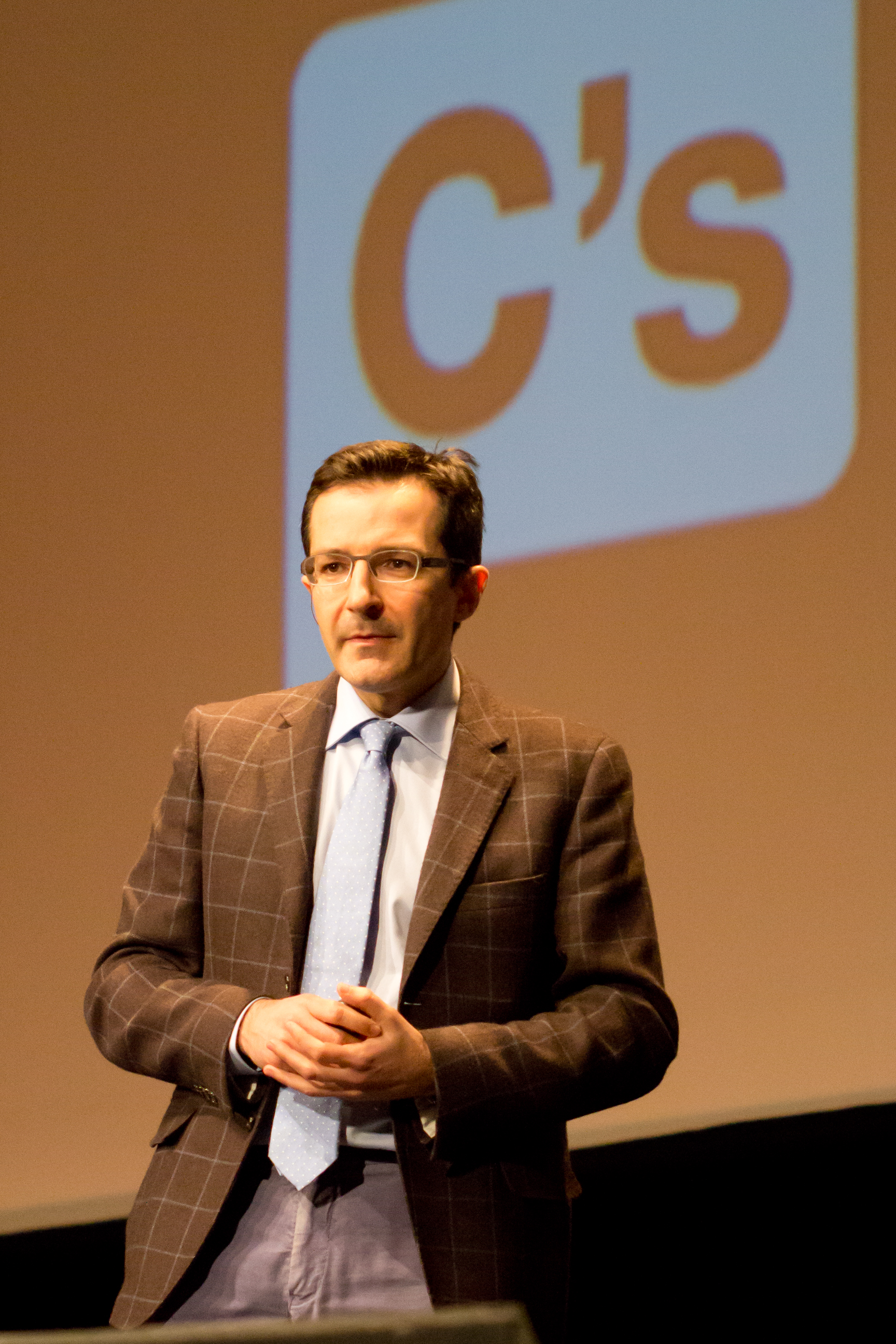
- Diego Comin at the presentation of Ciudadanos's economic program in Madrid (2015)

Academic background
- Alma mater: Harvard University (PhD); Universitat Pompeu Fabra (BA)

Academic work
- Discipline: Macroeconomics; Technology; Innovation Economics
- Institutions: Dartmouth College, Professor of Economics
- Website: http://www.dartmouth.edu/~dcomin/#; Information at IDEAS / RePEc

Diego Adolfo Comin is a Spanish economist who is currently Professor of Economics at Dartmouth College.

== Background and research ==
Comin's research focuses on macroeconomics, technology, and innovation economics. He has written on the effects of technology shifts and whether they act to challenge economic disparities, or only exacerbate existing wealth divisions.

His research has been published in a number of top economic journals such as the American Economic Review. The New York Times, The Wall Street Journal and The Boston Globe have all featured his commentary or work. In addition to teaching undergraduate courses, he is a Research Fellow at the Center for Economic Policy Research and a Faculty Research Fellow for the NBER. Comin is also a fellow for the Institute of New Economic Thinking.

From 2013 to 2015, Comin advised the prime minister of Malaysia on the country's development strategy and cofounded the Malaysian Public-Private Research Network. He has recently served as a consultant to Microsoft.

Comin previously served as an associate professor of business administration at Harvard Business School, where he won the Apgar Prize for Innovation in Teaching, from 2007 to 2014. He was an assistant professor of economics at New York University from 2000 to 2007.

Comin regularly teaches Economics 22 (Intermediate Macroeconomics) and Economics 70 (Immersion Experience) at Dartmouth.

== Education ==
Comin graduated from Universitat Pompeu Fabra in 1995 with a B.A. in economics and from Harvard University in 2000 with a Ph.D. and M.A. in economics.
