= Science Communication Observatory =

The Science Communication Observatory (Catalan: Observatori de la Comunicació Científica, Spanish: Observatorio de la Comunicación Científica, OCC) is a Special Research Centre attached to the Department of Communication of the Pompeu Fabra University in Barcelona, Spain, set up in 1994. This centre is specialized in the study and analysis of the transmission of scientific, medical, environmental and technological knowledge to society. The journalist Vladimir de Semir, associated professor of Science Journalism at the Pompeu Fabra University, was the founder and is the current director of the centre. A multidisciplinary team of researchers coming from different backgrounds (i.e. journalists, biologists, physicians, linguists, historians, etc.) is working on various lines of research: science communication; popularization of sciences, risk and crisis communication; science communication and knowledge representation; journalism specialized in science and technology; scientific discourse analysis; health and medicine in the daily press; relationships between science journals and mass media; history of science communication; public understanding of science; gender and science in the mass media, promotion of scientific vocations, science museology, etc.

== PCST Network & Academy ==
The Science Communication Observatory is linked to the international network on Public Communication of Science & Technology (PCST), which includes individuals from around the world who are active in producing and studying science communication and science and technology studies in academic, media, policy, and outreach settings among others. The PCST Network sponsors international conferences, electronic discussions, and other forums for fostering dialogues among the different groups of people interested in PCST, with the goal of increasing cross-fertilization across professional, cultural, international, and disciplinary boundaries. The PCST Network seeks to promote new ideas, methods, intellectual and practical questions and perspectives.

The first conference held by the PCST Network was at Poitiers, France in 1989. Since then biennial conferences have been held across the world, with recent conferences being held in Rotterdam (2023) and Aberdeen (2025). The 2027 conference is scheduled to be held in Shanghai between May 24-27, and will center on the theme "Science communication for a shared future: engage, empower, enlighten."

== European Forum on Science Journalism ==
In December 2007, the Science Communication Observatory organized with the European Commission the European Forum on Science Journalism (EFSJ) where leading science journalists and editors of national newspapers and specialised science publications from across Europe and the world met in Barcelona to discuss the challenges in reporting on science, the impact of new technologies on the profession and importance of linking science to society and everyday life together with leading scientists and top science communication professionals from across Europe, the US, Canada, China and Australia. A Special Eurobarometer on scientific research in the media and a European Guide to Science Journalism Training were presented in this forum. How to strengthen science coverage in the European press? How to convince editors to run science stories? How to assess the trustworthiness of scientific research? How to explain science in an understandable fashion? How to stimulate public interest in science news?... These were among the key questions addressed at the first European Forum on Science Journalism.

== Media for Science Forum ==
In May 2010, the Science Communication Observatory was member of the scientific committee of the Media for Science Forum organised by the Spanish Foundation for Science and Technology with the collaboration of the European Commission in the context of the Spanish Presidency of Europe 2010.
