= Josep Joan Moreso =

Spanish professor

Josep Joan Moreso is a Spanish former head of Pompeu Fabra University (UPF) and professor of philosophy of law.
