= Rita Almeida =

Portuguese economist (born 1974)

Rita K. Almeida
- Born: 16 August 1974 (age 51); Lisbon, Portugal
- Education: Ph.D. 2003 Pompeu Fabra University
- Occupations: Economist; Research Fellow
- Employers: World Bank; IZA Institute of Labor Economics

Rita K. Almeida (born 1974) is a Portuguese economist who joined the World Bank in 2002 as a research economist. After serving as a senior economist with responsibilities for lending and analysis in support of education in Latin America, Eastern Europe, and the Middle East and North Africa, as of June 2020 she is human development programme leader for the countries of Central America. Over the years, Almeida has coordinated a range of World Bank and IZA publications in the areas of education, job training and public social spending. Since 2003, she has been a Research Fellow of the IZA Institute of Labor Economics.

== Biography ==
Born on 16 August 1974 in Lisbon, Rita Almeida studied economics at the Catholic University of Portugal, graduating in 1997. She continued her economics studies at Pompeu Fabra University in Barcelona, earning an M.Sc. (1999) and a Ph.D. (2003).

From February 1997 to August 1998, Almeida worked in Lisbon for the Banco de Negócios Argentária as an equity research analyst. She then returned to Barcelona, working as a research assistant at Pompeu Fabra University. Since 2002 she has been employed by the World Bank, initially as a researcher, specializing in labour economics and development. She subsequently became a senior economist covering education, social protection and the labour market. In particular, she managed lending and analysis in Latin America, Eastern Europe, and the Middle East and North Africa. As of June 2020, she holds the post of lead economist and human development programme leader for the six countries of Central America.

== Selected publications ==
Rita Almeida has published a wide range of books and papers, including:

- Almeida, Rita K. (2010). Jump-Starting Self-Employment? Evidence for Welfare Participants in Argentina.
- Almeida, Rita K.; Packard, Truman G. (2018). Skills and Jobs in Brazil: An Agenda for Youth. World Bank Publications. ISBN 978-1-4648-1293-4.
- Dutz, Mark A.; Almeida, Rita K.; Packard, Truman G. (2018). The Jobs of Tomorrow: Technology, Productivity, and Prosperity in Latin America and the Caribbean. World Bank Publications. pp. 15–. ISBN 978-1-4648-1223-1.
