= Eugenio Trías Sagnier =

Spanish philosopher (1942–2013)

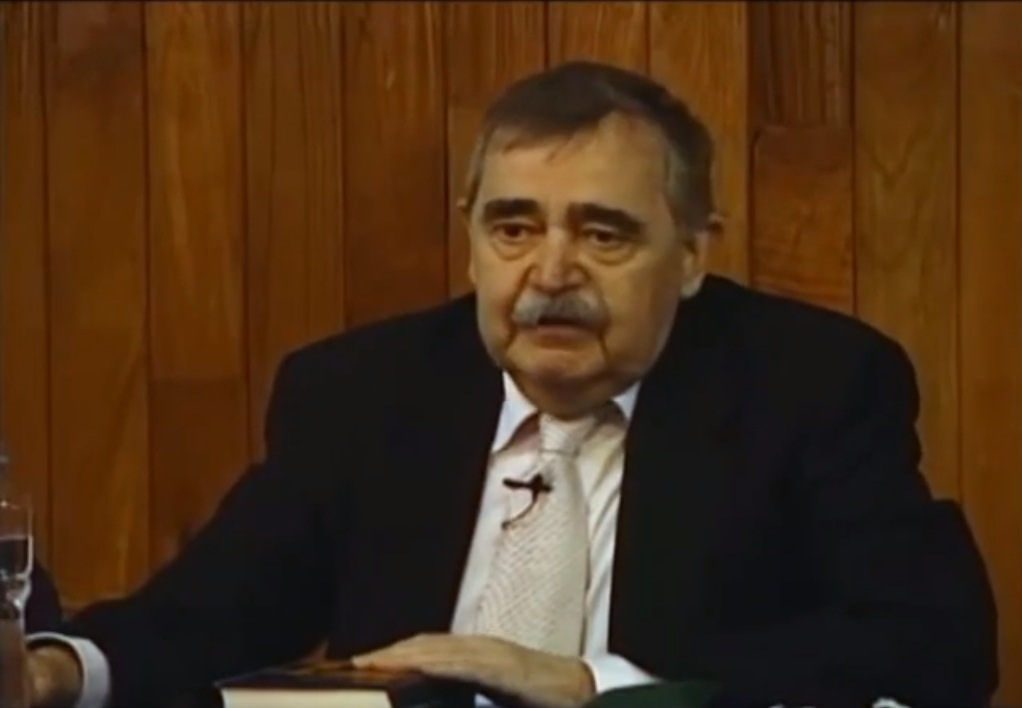
In March 2008 in México City

Eugenio Trías Sagnier (31 August 1942 – 10 February 2013) was a Spanish philosopher. Critics have likened his work to Ortega y Gasset in the philosophical literature written in Spanish.

== Biography ==
Trías was born in Barcelona. After obtaining his bachelor's degree in philosophy at the University of Barcelona in 1964, he continued his studies in Pamplona, Madrid, Bonn and Cologne. Since 1965 he was assistant professor and, later, associate professor of Philosophy at the University of Barcelona (UB) and the Universitat Autònoma of Barcelona (UAB). In 1976 he became assistant professor of aesthetics and composition at the School of Architecture of Barcelona. In 1986 he became Chair of Philosophy at this University, where he remained until 1992. In 1992 he became Chair Professor of Philosophy at the Pompeu Fabra University in Barcelona, where he remained as a professor of History of Ideas until his death. Trías died in his home city at age 70.

Trías published over thirty-five books, some of which have had several editions in Spain and abroad. His work is regarded by critics as one of two most significant philosophical pillars of contemporary Spanish thought. His first book, Philosophy and its Shadows, published in 1969, was called "the philosophy of a new generation" (Josep Maria Carandell).

== Thought ==
Trías had an encyclopedic knowledge of philosophy and worked in fields including ethics, politics, aesthetics, philosophy of religion, philosophy of history, theory of knowledge, and ontology. His personal conception of ontology, usually called "the philosophy of Limit," informed much of his work.

In chronological order, the main topics of Trías' philosophical works have been:

- The shadows of philosophical theories
- The reason of the irrational
- Artists and their society
- The Sinister as the limit and condition of beauty
- Passionate love as the basis of intelligence
- The Modernity crisis
- The human condition as a bordering existence
- The religious experience
- Beauty and the sacred
- A new ethics as an ethics of limit
- The musical turn of philosophy

In The Sirens' Song and The Sonorous Imagination, Trías argued that the philosophy of the 21st century must draw upon musical aspects over language, since the former represents the most perfect synthesis of beauty and knowledge.

== His main contributions to philosophy ==
Trías considered himself an "illuminist exorcist" who exposed philosophical reason to a permanent dialogue with its shadows. As an alternative to logical positivism, analytical philosophy or Marxist thought, he extended reason to spheres including irrationality and madness (Philosophy and Carnival); mythical and magical thought (Methodology of Magical Thought); passionate love (Treatise on Passion); the Sinister (Beauty and the Sinister) as a shadow of the categories of beauty and the sublime which founded traditional aesthetics; or the world of religions as the shadow of modern Western reason (The Age of the Spirit).

The most significant innovation of Trías' philosophy appeared in the early 1980s, when he discussed the concept of limes ("limit").

== Concept of limit ==
His concept of the limit is the result of an intense dialogue with the Kantian tradition, Wittgenstein and Heidegger, and a commentary on Wittgenstein's statement "subject is a limit of the world." Trías proposed that being (whose issue has always been the main question for Western philosophy from its origins) may be understood as "being of limit" -- that is, the border area that separates as well as joins the phenomena and the noumena. That limit is also the boundary between reason and its shadows. Whereas in Kant's thought there was not such a limit or borderline that merges and splits the phenomenon and the thing-in-itself, Trías held that such a limit exists. He argued that it is precarious, delicate, subtle but fundamental, and the being that philosophers intend to define. Trías developed an anthropology in which the person is conceived as an inhabitant of the being's limit. In this respect, person is always referred to the above-mentioned limit, which for Trías has an ontological significance.

== Prizes and awards ==
- In 1974 he received the New Critics Award for his book Drama and Identity
- In 1975 he received the Anagrama Essay Award for The Artist and the City
- In 1983 he was awarded with the Spanish National Essay Prize for Beauty and the Sinister
- In 1995 he received the Ciutat de Barcelona Award, for The Age of the Spirit
- In 1995 he won the 13th International Friedrich Nietzsche Prize awarded in Palermo, Italy, by the International Association of Nietzsche Study and Research. Something like a "Nobel of philosophy" (El Mundo, 10 February, 2013), the prize recognized a philosopher's entire body of work. Established in 1978, it was awarded to such thinkers as Popper, Rorty, and Derrida, and Trías was the only philosopher in the Spanish language to ever win it.
- In 1997 he was awarded with the Medal of the City of Buenos Aires
- In 2000 the Autonomous University of Santo Domingo (UASD) gave Trías an Honoris Causa Doctorate
- In 2003 the National University of San Marcos Lima (UNMSM) gave him an Honoris Causa Doctorate
- In 2004 he received the Gold Medal of the Círculo de Bellas Artes de Madrid
- In 2006 the Autonomous University of Madrid (UAM) gave Trías – together with Jose Saramago – an Honoris Causa Doctorate
- In 2007 his bestseller The Sirens' Song received two awards as the best essay of the year: the Terenci Moix and the Qwerty prizes
- In 2009 he received the Mariano de Cavia Award, for his article "The Great Trip," published by the newspaper ABC
- In 2010 he received the Creation Prize of Extremadura, an official award
- He has been Vice-president of the Reina Sofía National Museum (Madrid) and Chairman of the Advisory Council of the Institute of Philosophy at the Centro Superior de Investigaciones Científicas of Spain.

== Works ==
- Philosophy and its Shadows (1969, three editions)
- Philosophy and Carnival (1970, 3 editions)
- Theory of Ideology (1970, 3 editions)
- Methodology of Magical Thought (1971)
- Drama and Identity (1973, 3 editions)
- The Artist and the City (1975, 3 editions)
- Meditation on Power (1976, 2 editions)
- The Lost Memory of Things (1977, 2 editions)
- Treatise on Passion (1978, 5 editions)
- The Language of Forgiveness. An Essay on Hegel (1979)
- Beauty and the Sinister (1981, 5 editions)
- Philosophy of the Future (1984, 2 editions)
- The World's Limits (1985, 2 editions)
- The Philosophical Adventure (1987)
- Limit's Logic (1991)
- The Tiredness of the West (1992, 4 editions), with Rafael Argullol
- The Age of the Spirit (1994, 3 editions)
- Thinking Religion (1997, 2 editions)
- Vertigo and Passion (1998, 2 editions)
- The Borderline Reason (1999)
- City over City (2001)
- The Tree of Life (2003)
- The Thread of Truth (2004)
- Politics and its Shadow (2005)
- The Sirens' Song (2007)
- Philosophical Creations (2009), a selection of his collected works (2 volumes)
- The Sonorous Imagination (2010)
