= Noce =

Noce may refer to:

== People ==
- Augusto Del Noce (1910–1989), Italian philosopher and political thinker
- Claudio Noce (born 1975), Italian film director and screenwriter
- Daniel Noce, American army officer
- Luisa Della Noce (1923–2008), Italian actress
- Mario Noce (born 1999), Italian footballer
- Paul Noce (born 1959), American baseball player
- Teresa Noce (1900–1980), Italian labour leader and activist
- Vincent Della Noce (born 1943), Canadian politician

== Places ==
- Noce, Palermo, Italy
- Noce, Vicopisano, Italy
- Nocé, Orne, France

== Other ==
- Noce (river)
