= Javier Díaz Noci =

Spanish academic

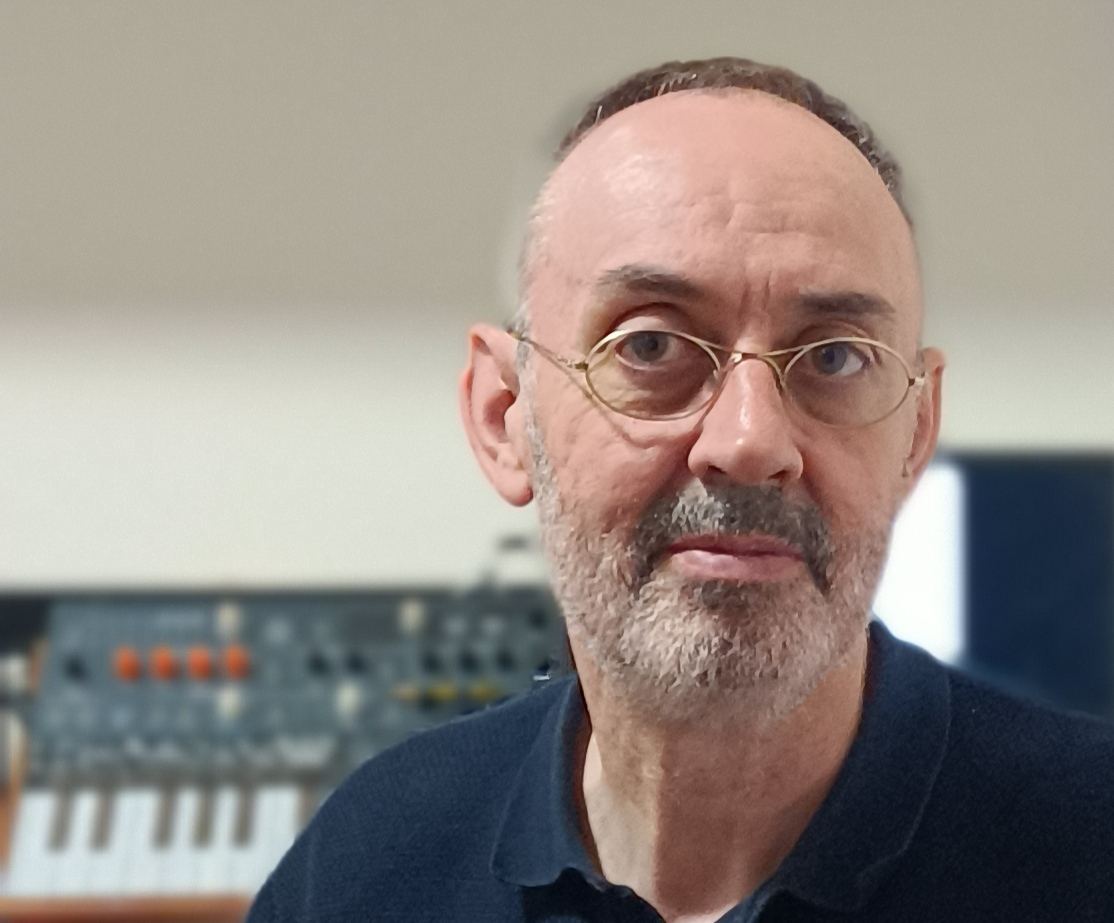
- Díaz Noci in 2024
- Born: September 7, 1964 (age 61); Vitoria-Gasteiz, Basque Country, Spain
- Citizenship: Spanish
- Education: University of the Basque Country
- Occupation: Full university professor
- Employer: Pompeu Fabra University
- Website: www.upf.edu/web/diaz-noci

Javier Díaz Noci (Vitoria-Gasteiz, 1964) is a professor and researcher at Pompeu Fabra University. He was one of the first researchers on digital journalism in Spain. He has also specialized in the study of the history of journalism and legal research on intellectual property applied to news, especially the impact that artificial intelligence is having on copyright.

== Early life ==
He was born into a working class family. He graduated in journalism from the University of the Basque Country in 1987. He was a journalist between 1985 and 1992, both in newspapers (La Gaceta del Norte, Deia) and radio stations (amongst others, Radio Nacional de España, the Spanish public broadcasting service). Subsequently, he has collaborated with various information and opinion programs on the Basque public radio station Euskadi Irratia.

After finishing his degree in Information Sciences, he completed doctoral studies in the Department of Contemporary History of the University of the Basque Country. He obtained his first doctorate, in history, in June 1992, with a thesis on the history of journalism in the Basque language. He obtained his second degree, in law, from the University of the Basque Country in 1996, and his second doctorate, in Law, in 2016, with a PhD dissertation on copyright and news reporting.

He was an associate professor at the Faculty of Social and Communication Sciences at the University of the Basque Country between 1994 and 2008, and from 2008 to the present he is a full professor at the Pompeu Fabra University (Barcelona). He has also been a visiting researcher at, among other centers, the University of Oxford (1998–1999), the Federal University of Bahia, Brazil (2005 and 2008), the University of East Anglia in the United Kingdom (2021) and the University College Dublin, Ireland (2023–2024).

He was the head of the media section of the Basque Studies Society, and is a member of the Association of Communication Historians of Spain and the International Society for the Study of News Pamphlets (SIERS).

He is author of more than 300 contributions on the aforementioned topics.

== Career ==
He began his professional career as a journalist in 1985 in the daily newspaper La Gaceta del Norte, and upon completing his degree in Journalism he worked for a few months at Radio Vitoria, and then collaborated with the newspaper Deia and Radiocadena Española. He was a journalist and speaker for Radio Nacional de España between 1989 and 1991. He worked in 1991 and 1992 at the Radio Popular station in San Sebastián. Between 2012 and 2024 he has collaborated with the Basque public radio station Euskadi Irratia as a talk show host, commenting on current political events.

His activity as a professor and university researcher began in 1994, at his alma mater, the Faculty of Social Sciences and Communication of the University of the Basque Country. Between that year and 2008, he taught subjects related to news writing, both in Spanish and the Basque language. He was the author of the first handbooks on news writing in Basque.

He moved to the Pompeu Fabra University of Barcelona in October 2008, and he obtained the position of university full professor in 2012. At this university, he has been in charge of teaching subjects related to Digital journalism and, since 2021, he is professor of Journalism History. He has been the coordinator of the PhD program in communication and coordinator of two research master's degrees, where he has taught subjects on research methodology. He has researched the application of new technologies to postgraduate teaching and has coordinated several free access handbooks on research techniques applied to the study of social communication.

== Research career ==
As a researcher, his main topics are: digital journalism and artificial intelligence, history of journalism, copyright law, and inequality and the news.

=== Digital journalism ===
Javier Díaz Noci researches different aspects of digital journalism from 1994. He is co-author of the first book on digitak journalism in Spain, published in 1996 (El periodismo electrónico. Información y servicios multimedia en la era del ciberespacio), and coordinated, with Ramon Salaverría, the first Spanish handbook. He participated between 2001 and 2006 in the COST-A20 European research project (European Co-operation in the Field of Science and Technical Research), coordinated by Colin Sparks, on The impact of the Internet in the mass media in Europe, and he was the leading researcher of the first Spanish competitive project on the topic, coordinating a group of participants from the University of the Basque Country, University of Santiago de Compostela, University of Malaga and University of Navarra. He consolidated the network and was, with Professor Marcos Palacios, from the Federal University of Bahia (Brazil) the coordinator of a Brazil-Spain research network, whose major output was a book on Online journalism: research methods. A multidisciplinary approach in comparative perspective. One of the most cited articles in which he participated is "Public Sphere 2.0? The Democratic Qualities of Citizen". He has also dealt with media convergence in digital journalism and lately he has published about the impact of artificial intelligence in the newsrooms.

=== History of journalism ===
His initial interest in this area of expertise was the Basque journalism. His wrote his PhD dissertation on the Basque-language one. He also worked on parliamentary prosopography. His main topic when researching journalism history is, though, Early Modern journalism in the Spanish empire (1600–1714), including studies on the first semiperiodical newspaper published in Valencia (1618–1621), the narrative strategies of Early Modern news, on several news hubs in the Iberian peninsula, and on the Spanish-language press published in the Low Countries.

=== Copyright law, news reporting and AI ===
After graduating in Law in 1996, he opened a line of research on intellectual property and copyright in the news, and especially the legal impact of the Internet and new technologies on news reporting. When working within the COST A-20 network, he worked on this topic in 2002. Afterwards, he focused this branch of research on news reporting and copyright, especially the impact of new technologies.

Invited by OpenForum Europe, he was a speaker in 2016 at a seminar session in the European Parliament on the reform of copyright law.

He obtained his second doctorate, in this discipline, in 2016, with a thesis titled Copyright and news reporting, supervised by Antoni Rubí Puig.

Since 2020, he focuses on the impact that the adoption of artificial intelligence systems in the newsrooms may have on copyright of journalists and media.

=== Inequality and the news ===
Since 2017, Javier Díaz-Noci, "concerned about the advance of income inequality in our society and the treatment of this issue by media" began a research line on economic inequality and the media, and on inequality of access to information. His approach to the issue is summarized in the book Researching the digital divide, news, and the media: Towards information equity. He published several reports of the topic (Housing inequality coverage in the media: A comparative analysis, Inequalities and Information Access. An expert panel report), as well as chapters and articles, and on some other related topics, such as news avoidance.

=== Visiting researcher ===
Javier Díaz-Noci's first short stays as a visiting scholar, both in 1997, were at the Faculty of Law of the University of Bologna (Italy), and the University of Nevada, Reno (United States of America). During the academic year 1997-1998 he was appointed Basque Visiting Fellow at the University of Oxford, adscribed at St Antony's College, where he co-organized, with Prof Ilaria Favretto, a seminar on Southern Europe. He carried out research stays in 2005 and 2008 at the Federal University of Bahia (Brazil). In 2021 he carried out a three-months research stay at the British University of East Anglia, and between September 2023 and February 2024 a six-month stay at the University College Dublin (Ireland), where he worked on both the housing crisis in the media, and its relationship with inequality, and the influence of artificial intelligence on copyright law and the media, in a report that was published by the UCD Centre for Digital Policy.

== Literary translator ==
Javier Díaz Noci has translated several literary works related to journalism from various languages (Italian, Portuguese, and English) into Spanish. During his stay in the 1998-1999 academic year at the University of Oxford, he translated the first play on journalism, The staple of news (1625-26), by Ben Jonson. He completed that translation with some passages by some other Jacobean English authors, such as James Shirley, John Fletcher, Richard Brathwaite, and Donald Lupton.
