= Music Technology Group =

Research team of Universitat Pompeu Fabra

- Type: Research Group
- Established: 1994
- Parent institution: Universitat Pompeu Fabra
- Affiliations: Department of Information and Communication Technologies
- Director: Xavier Serra
- Academic staff: Xavier Serra, Emilia Gómez, Sergi Jordà, Rafael Ramírez
- Location: Barcelona, Spain
- Website: https://www.upf.edu/web/mtg

The Music Technology Group (MTG) is a research group of the Department of Information and Communication Technologies of the Universitat Pompeu Fabra, Barcelona. It was founded in 1994 by Xavier Serra, and it specializes in sound and music computing research.

== Ongoing research ==
The MTG research is focused on sound and music computing; it develops basic disciplines such as signal processing, machine learning and human-computer interaction. It addresses application-oriented problems related to music. Current active topics include:

- Audio signal processing: focusing on spectral modeling for sound synthesis and transformations.
- Sound and Music description: focusing on semantic analysis and classification of audio signals.
- Musical and Advanced Interaction: focusing on table-top interfaces for musical creation and exploration.
- Sound and Music communities: focusing on social networking technologies for sound and music applications.

== Educational activities ==
The MTG develops educational activities within the UPF and in collaboration with the ESMUC. Its researchers participate in several academic programs:

- PhD in Sound and Music Computing at the UPF
- Master in Sound and Music Computing at the UPF
- Master in Sonology, collaboration between UPF and ESMUC
- Bachelor's degree in Audiovisual Systems Engineering at the UPF
- Bachelor's degree in Computer Engineering at the UPF
- Bachelor's degree in Sonology at the ESMUC

== See also ==
- Sound and music computing
