= Pietro Galter =

Italian painter

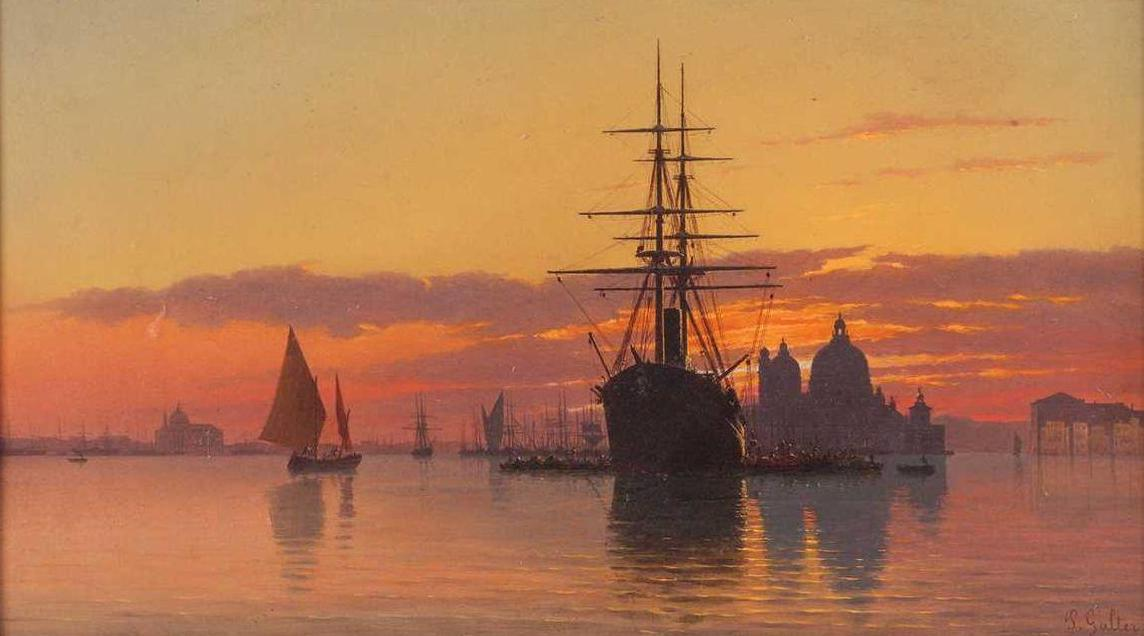
Venice at Sunset

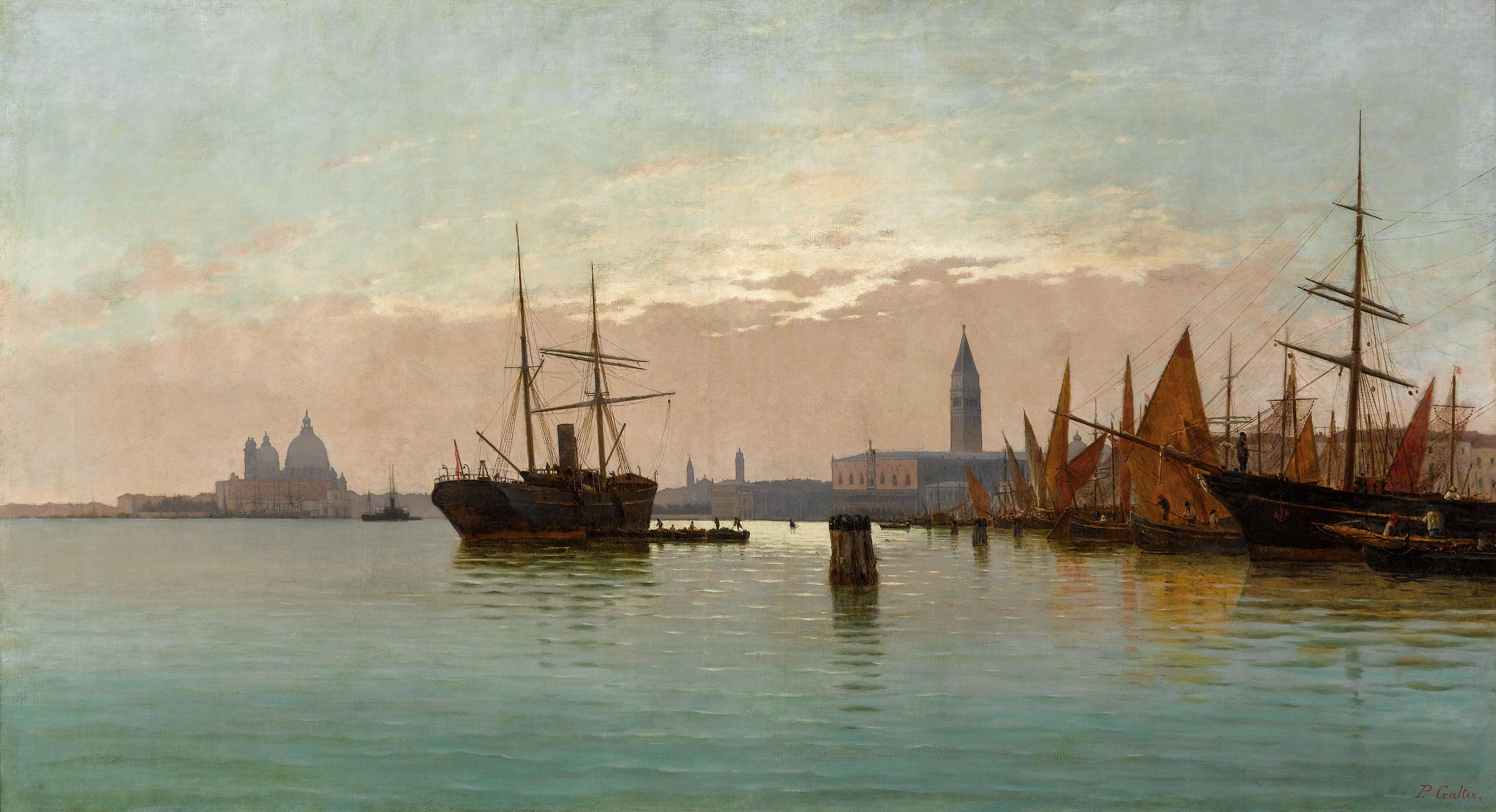
Entrance to Grand Canal

Pietro Galter (1840–1901) was an Italian painter noted for marine vedute.

He was born in Venice but died in Florence. He began his studies at the Accademia di Belle Arti of Venice. In 1881, he exhibited in the Permanente of Milan: Sulla laguna. In 1883, he exhibited in the Esposizione Internazionale of Rome: Pescatori in laguna. In 1887, he exhibited in Venice: Montagna; Zoldo; Venezia dai giardini; Canale della Giudecca. Galter's designs were often drawn in watercolor.
