= Lluís Galter =

Catalan film director and screenwriter

Lluís Galter (born 1983, in Figueres, Spain) is a Catalan film director and screenwriter.

== Biography ==
After earning his B.S. in Audiovisual Communications from Pompeu Fabra University in Barcelona (2006), Lluís Galter has written and directed several short films, two of them during his stay at the Film and TV School of the Academy of Performing Arts in Prague (FAMU). Many of his works have been broadcast and selected for exhibition in a number of European museums. He is currently developing a documentary that will be part of a collective work with other young directors. Caracremada is his first feature film, about Catalan anarchist and anti-Franco fighter Ramón Vila Capdevila. The film premiered at the Orizzonti competitive section of the 67th Venice International Film Festival in September 2010. It was also screened at the 12th Jeonju International Film Festival (South Korea) in May 2011, and will be screened in the 58th San Sebastian International Film Festival(Spain) in September 2011.

== Films ==
- 2007 Ejemplo de la garza(Heron's example): Short film based on the fable by Ramon Llull “The wonder book” included in the DVD Cinéma de notre temps – Shohei Imamura (Vol. 1), released by Intermedio. Screened at the Truffaut Cinema in Girona (Spain).
- 2005 Berlin. Nueva sinfonía en 326 postales: Short documentary film that attempts to explain a four-day trip to Berlin with five seconds shots and no editing. Screened at the Vrije Academie in The Hague (Holland) inside the programme TRANSART 5 and at the Contemporary Art Museum in Tallinn (Estonia).
- 2005 KAPR: Short documentary film about the slaughter of carps on the streets of Prague over Christmas days. Screened at the Vrije Academie in The Hague (Holland) and at the Contemporary Art Museum in Tallinn (Estonia).
- 2004 Aventuras y desventuras del acordeón que dijo basta (Adventures and misadventures of the accordion that said that's enough). Short documentary film about a trip to China from the point of view of a Cossack accordion and its legend. Screened at the itinerant exhibition TRANSART 5 at the Museu de l’Empordà in Figueres (Spain).
- 2003 Homenaje a Calders (Homage to Calders). Short film about two school friends who meet in the park and talk about their lives until they find out that one of them is 15 years older than the other.
