= Valeria Zalaquett =

Chilean photographer and portraitist (born 1971)

- Born: Valeria Francisca Zalaquett Fuentealba; 27 November 1971 (age 54); Santiago, Chile
- Education: Pompeu Fabra University
- Occupation: Photographer
- Awards: APES Award (1997)

Valeria Francisca Zalaquett Fuentealba (born 27 November 1971) is a Chilean photographer and portraitist who has worked mainly in contemporary and digital art.

== Biography ==
Valeria Zalaquett has a degree in philosophy from the Pontifical Catholic University of Chile, an institution where she also took courses in photography and filmmaking. In addition, she complemented her training with a master's degree in Digital Arts at the Pompeu Fabra University in Barcelona.

In her work, a fusion between photography and visual arts can be seen through photomontage and the use of black and white photography "through compositions that interlace different strata of shapes and textures, picking up the new technological resources to translate a language of their own." According to art critic Waldemar Sommer, Zalaquett "uses photography as painting." In particular, it has been observed that her signature "has been the mixture of images, reaching a point where these seem more like paintings. Her photos intervene digitally, as if they were layers of paintings."

== Group exhibitions ==
Zalaquett has participated in group exhibitions at the ArteBA in Buenos Aires (2008), Digital Media Festival in Toronto (2011), in Water at the Amsterdam Photography Biennale (2004), Paisaje, Figura Humana, Bodegón: Una revisión a la Fotografía Chilena Contemporánea at the Chilean National Museum of Fine Arts (2006), and Video "8 tries, Parrilla at the Centro Cultural Matucana 100 (2005).

== Awards ==
In 1997 she received the APES Award for her work in lighting design for Sexo, Drogas y Rock & Roll.
