= Pompeu Fabra University =

Public university in Barcelona, Spain

Coordinates: 41°22′45″N 2°10′47″E

- Universitat Pompeu Fabra
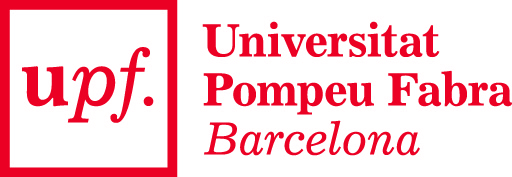
- Type: Public university
- Established: 18 June 1990; 36 years ago
- Affiliations: Europaeum, The Guild, TPC, Vives network, EUA, EUTOPIA, ACUP, A4U
- Budget: €150.5m (2020)
- Rector: Laia de Nadal i Clanchet
- Administrative staff: 592 professors (full-time equivalent) and 670 administration staff
- Students: 9,945 undergraduates (2015/2016) and 2,613 graduates (2014/2015)
- Location: Plaça de la Mercè, 10-12, 08002 Barcelona, Catalonia, Spain
- Campus: Urban
- Language: Catalan
- Colours
- Website: www.upf.edu

University Ranking
International Global
	National	Europe	World
THE 2022 General	3	69	156
THE 2022 Under 50	1	7	16
QS 2023 General	5	97	233
QS 2021 Under 50	1	8	28
ARWU 2021	top 9-12	-	top 400-500
U-Multirank 2022	1	4	-
- More info on the UPF rankings website

Pompeu Fabra University (Catalan: Universitat Pompeu Fabra [uniβəɾsiˈtat pumˈpɛw ˈfaβɾə], UPF) is a public university located in Barcelona, Catalonia, Spain. Established in 1990 by the Government of Catalonia, the university is named after Catalan philologist Pompeu Fabra.

The university offers numerous English-taught programs, joint degrees, and partnerships with institutions such as Sciences Po, LSE, and UCLA.

== Campuses ==
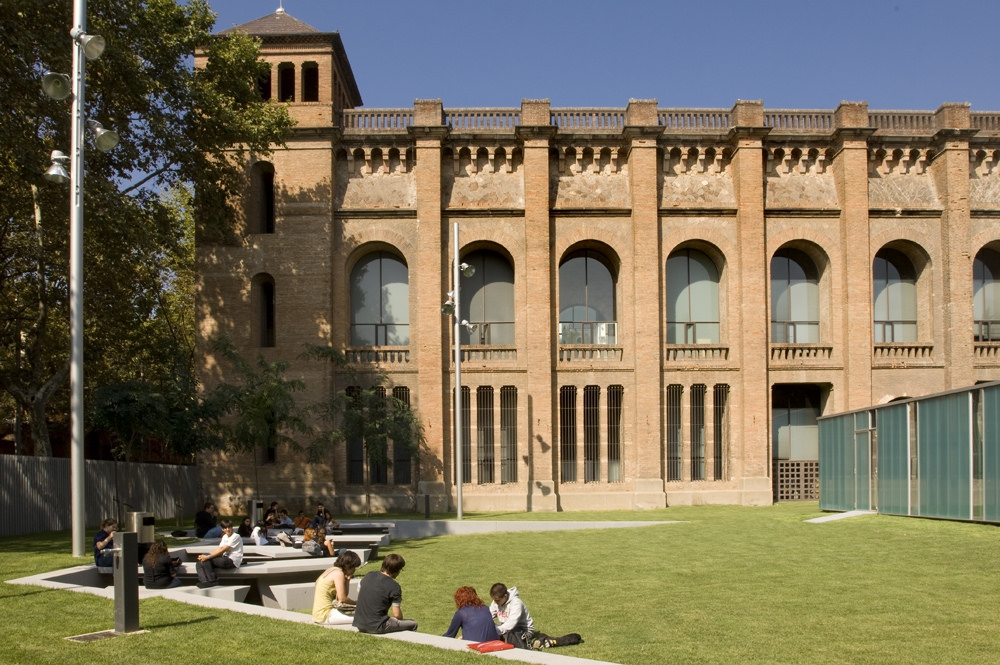
Dipòsit de les Aigües (library), Ciutadella Campus

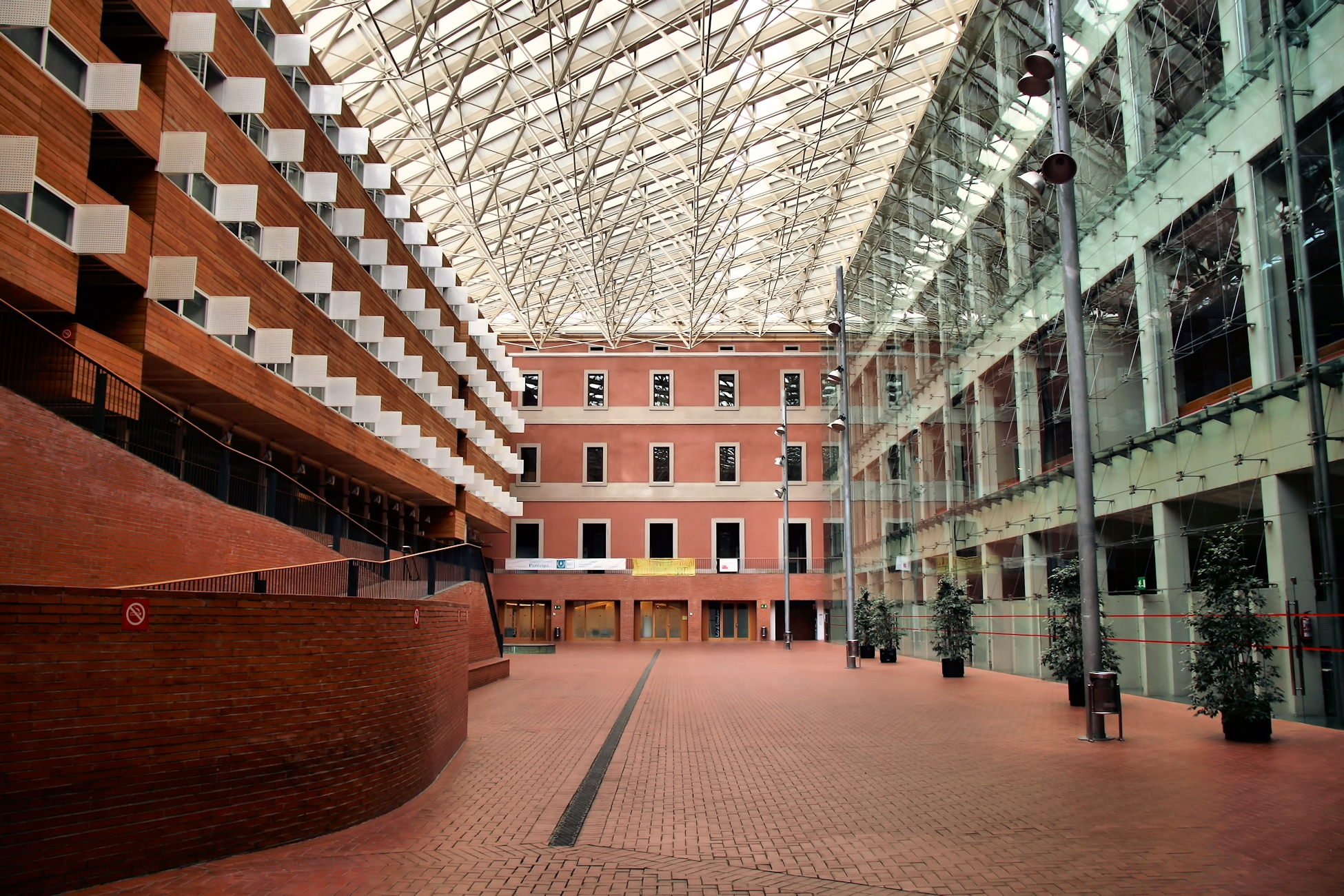
Roger de Llúria building, Ciutadella Campus

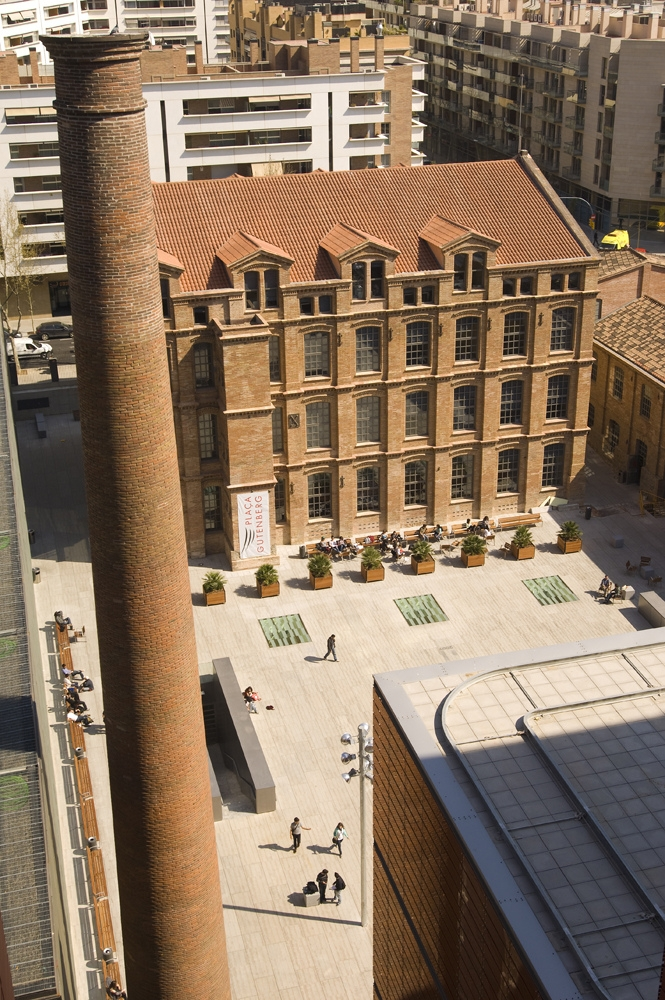
Poblenou Campus

The university offers its studies around three areas of knowledge, each one developed on a different campus:

- the social sciences and humanities (Citadels Campus, next to Parc de la Ciutadella)
- the health and life sciences (Mar Campus, next to the Port Olímpic)
- the ICT and communication sciences (Poblenou Campus, next to the Can Framis Museum)

== Teaching ==
Specifically, teaching is organized in seven faculties and one engineering school:

- Faculty of Health and Life Sciences
- Faculty of Economics and Business
- Faculty of Political and Social Sciences
- Faculty of Communication
- Faculty of Law
- Faculty of Humanities
- Faculty of Translation and Language Sciences
- Engineering School

=== Higher education affiliated centers ===
Finally, the university also has several higher education affiliated centers:

- Institut Barcelona d'Estudis Internacionals (IBEI)
- Tecnocampus
- UPF Barcelona School of Management
- International Trade Business School (ESCI)
- Mar University School of Nursing (ESIM)
- Barcelona School of Economics

== Research ==
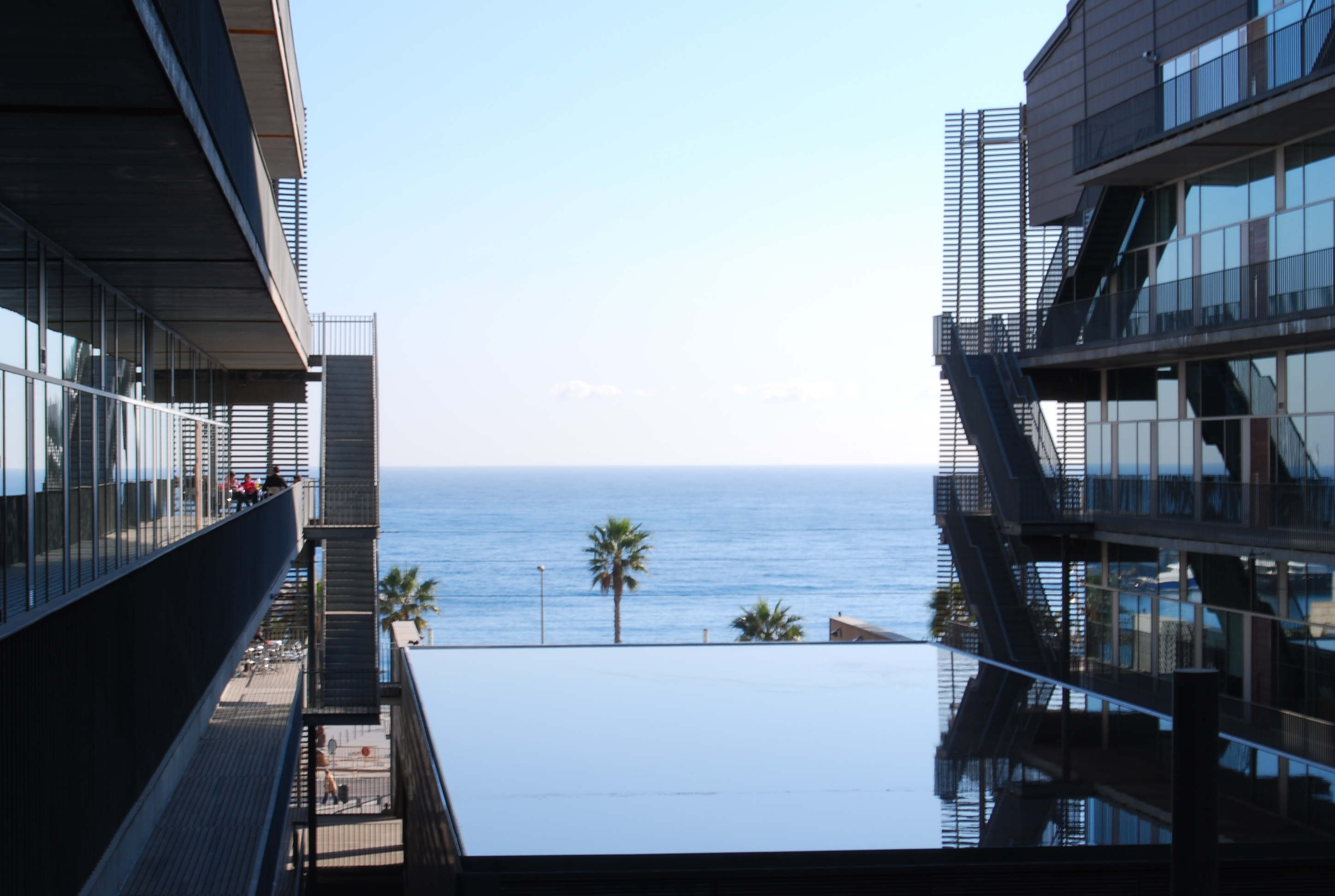
Barcelona Biomedical Research Park (PRBB), Pompeu Fabra University

Research is organized in eight departments:

- Department of Experimental and Health Sciences
- Department of Political and Social Sciences
- Department of Communication
- Department of Law
- Department of Economics and Business
- Department of Humanities
- Department of Information and Communications Technologies
- Department of Translation and Language Sciences

Moreover, in order to promote research and transfer activities undertaken by university researchers and provide them with greater international visibility, the university is developing the UPF Research Park in the fields of social sciences, humanities, communication and information technologies. The UPF Research Park, which develops its activity at Ciutadella and Poblenou Campuses, coordinates its activities in the fields of health and life sciences with the Barcelona Biomedical Research Park (PRBB), located at Mar Campus.

=== University institutes and research centres ===
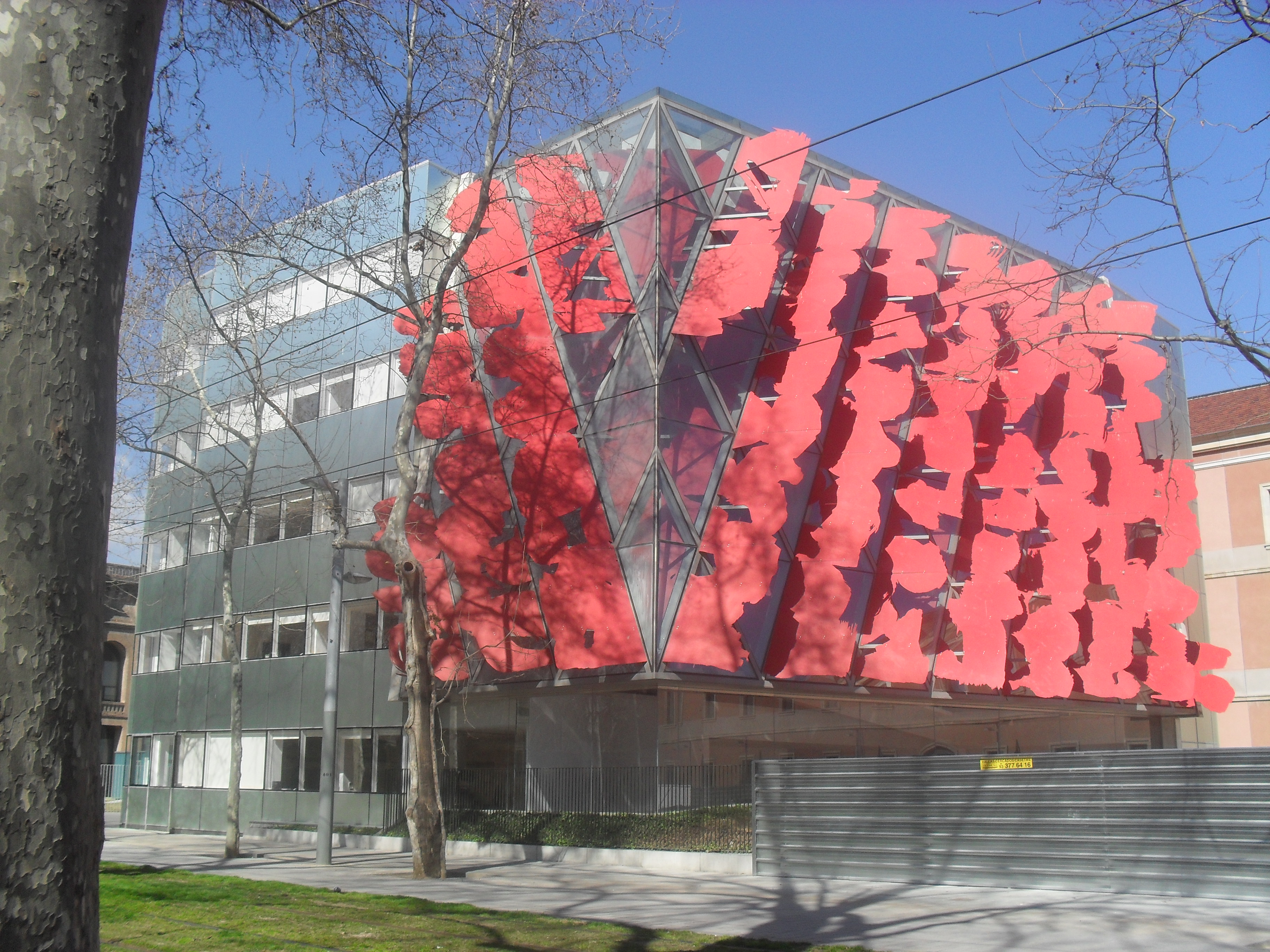
The Institut Barcelona d'Estudis Internacionals (IBEI) is located in the Merce Rodoreda Building, Ciutadella Campus

- Institut Barcelona d'Estudis Internacionals (IBEI) (interuniversity research institute)
- UPF-Centre for Animal Ethics (UPF-CAE) (think tank)
- Institut Universitari de Cultura (IUC) (research institute)
- Music Technology Group (MTG) (research group)
- Science Communication Observatory (OCC) (special research centre)
- Hospital del Mar Medical Research Institute (IMIM) (attached research university institute)
- Centre for Genomic Regulation (CRG) (attached research university institute)
- Barcelona School of Economics (BSE) (attached research university institute)
- Barcelona Institute for Global Health (ISGlobal) (attached research university institute)
- Institute of Evolutionary Biology (IBE) (joint research institute)
- Research Centre for International Economics (CREI) (participated research centre)
- Institute for Political Economy and Governance (IPEG) (participated research centre)
- BarcelonaBeta Brain Research Center (participated research centre)
- Phonos Foundation (associated research centre)

==== Research Centre for International Economics ====
The Research Centre for International Economics (Centre de Recerca en Economia Internacional (CREI)) is a research institute sponsored by the government of Catalonia (Generalitat de Catalunya) and the UPF led by the economist Jordi Galí. Its headquarters is on the campus of UPF in Barcelona, near the Department of Economics and Business at UPF (Ciutadella Campus), which collaborates in many research and teaching fields.

The research activities are focused on international economics and macroeconomics (including growth, business cycles, monetary economics, macroeconometrics, trade and international finance, economic geography, etc.). It tries to emphasize these fields of studies in the European dimension.

== Governance ==
Enric Argullol served as rector from the founding until June 2001, followed by M. Rosa Virós i Galtier (2001–2005), Josep Joan Moreso (2005–2013), Jaume Casals (2013–2021) and Oriol Amat (2021–2023). The current rector, Laia de Nadal, was elected in May 2023.

== Rankings ==
University rankings

Global – Overall
- ARWU World: 301–400 (2023)
- QS World: =265 (2026)
- THE World: 201–250 (2024)
- USNWR Global: =196 (2023)

The position of UPF is presented in the following international rankings: Times Higher Education (THE), Quacquarelli Symonds (QS), the one published by Shanghai University (ARWU), U-Multirank (promoted by the EU), and the Leiden ranking, which is focused on research.

UPF's position in university rankings
RANKING	Spain	Europe	World
THE 2021 "150 Under 50"	1	7	15
QS 2021 "50 Under 50"	1	8	28
U-Ranking 2021 (national)	1	-	-
U-Multirank 2021	1	4	-
Leiden 2021 "% of Top 10% publications"	1	29	78

== Notable alumni ==
- Rita Almeida, economist
- Pol Antràs, economist and professor at Harvard
- Elsa Artadi, economist, academic and politician
- Meritxell Batet, jurist and politician
- Javier Beltrán, film and theatre actor
- Genís Boadella, lawyer and politician
- David Bonneville, London-based filmmaker
- Gloria Aura Bortolini; journalist, photographer and filmmaker
- Antonio Briceño, photographer
- Javier Calvo, writer
- Diego Comin, economist
- Xeito Fole, transmedia artist and researcher
- Lluís Galter, cinema director
- Berta García Faet, poet, translator, and scholar of Hispanic literature
- Teresa Garcia‑Milà, professor of economics at UPF and director of the Barcelona School of Economics
- Uri Giné, musician
- Míriam Hatibi, data analyst and activist
- Joan Herrera i Torres, lawyer and politician
- Teresa Colom i Pich, poet and novelist
- Tatiana Huezo, film director of Salvadoran and Mexican nationality
- Isaki Lacuesta, film director
- Oliver Laxe, film director, screenwriter and actor
- Núria Mas, economist, professor at IESE and counselor to Banco de España
- Andreu Mas-Colell, economist, former UPF professor, Catalan government minister
- Sergi Miquel, politician
- Carles Mundó, lawyer and politician
- Neus Munté, politician
- Jordi Nadal (1929–2020), economist and historian, taught at UPF, awarded doctor honoris causa by UPF
- Mónica Ojeda, Ecuadorian writer
- Martha Lucía Ospina Martínez, first woman director of Colombia's Instituto Nacional de Salud
- Marta Pascal, politician
- Marta Rosique, politician
- Gabriel Rufián, politician
- Sandra Sabatés, journalist
- Xavier Serra, founder of UPF’s Music Technology Group
- Uwe Sunde, German economist
- Roger Torrent, politician and urban planner
- Nicole Vanden Broeck, filmmaker
- Mireia Vehí, sociologist and politician
- Alexia Putellas, professional footballer
- Valeria Zalaquett, Chilean photographer and portraitist

== Notable faculty ==
- Josep Acebillo, research professor in architecture, former city planner of Barcelona; RIBA Gold Medalist
- Gøsta Esping-Andersen, sociologist
- Maria Teresa Cabré, linguist
- Jaume Casals, philosopher
- Guillem López Casasnovas, economist
- Teun A. van Dijk, linguist
- Jordi Galí, economist
- Xavier Freixas, economist
- Antoni Ivorra, associate professor in biomedical electronics; neuroprosthetics
- Sergi Jordà, music technology scholar
- Jorge Lobo, professor in ICT; wireless sensor networks, Java programming
- Xavier Cuadras-Morató, professor in Economics & Business; expertise in banking and international economics
- Josep Joan Moreso, legal scholar
- Vicenç Navarro, sociologist
- Javier Díaz Noci, digital journalism researcher
- Xavier Sala-i-Martin, economist
- Andreu Mas-Colell, economist
- Eugenio Trías Sagnier, philosopher
- Xavier Serra, music technology scholar
- Paul Verschure, cognitive systems and neuro-robotics
- Ricardo Baeza-Yates, computer scientist
- Santiago Zabala, hermeneutic philosopher
- Ricard Zapata-Barrero, full professor of migration studies; director of GRITIM-UPF interdisciplinary research group
- Lydia Zimmermann, filmmaker
