= Mayte Gómez Molina =

Spanish digital artist (born 1993)

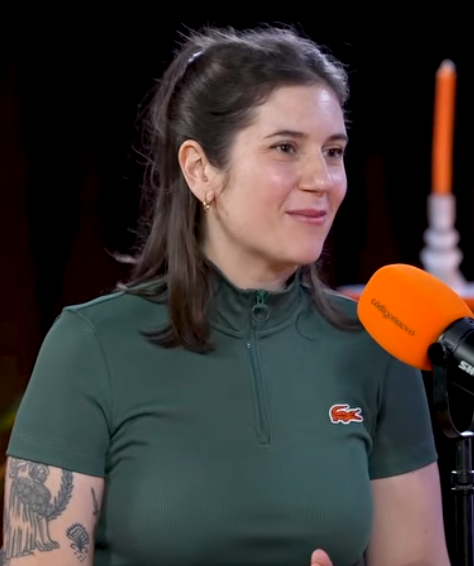
- In a 2026 interview
- Born: 1993 (age 32–33); Madrid, Spain
- Education: Art Institute of Chicago
- Occupations: Digital artist, researcher, writer
- Awards: Fulbright Scholarship; Miguel Hernández National Youth Poetry Award
- Website: maytegomezmolina.com

Mayte Gómez Molina (born 1993) is a Spanish digital artist, researcher, and writer. She was the recipient of the 2023 Miguel Hernández National Youth Poetry Award.

== Biography ==
Mayte Gómez Molina was born in Madrid in 1993. She began her studies in fine arts, then focused on audiovisual communication. She was a Fulbright Scholar from 2019 to 2021, which allowed her to study for a master's degree in film, video, new media and animation at the Art Institute of Chicago.

In 2022, she made the documentary Como ardilla en el agua (Like a Squirrel in the Water) together with her mother, Mayte Molina.

As an artist, she has participated in Immaterial TV at the Tabakalera cultural center in San Sebastián, the "Me gustas Pixelad_" festival at La Casa Encendida in Madrid, the Frame & Frequency VII exhibition in Rockville, Maryland, and the Supernova Digital Animation Festival in Denver.

In 2021, Gómez held her first solo exhibition, Me veo la nuca (I See the Back of My Neck), at the University of Granada. The same year, she published her first written work, the poetry collection Mi Piel Virtual, Cansada (My Virtual, Tired Skin), which originated from that exhibition.

In 2026, she completed her first novel, La boca llena de trigo (The Mouth Full of Wheat), described by its publisher as "A reflection on self-demand, imposture and the emotional and economic precarity that must be faced by those who try to make their way in a world still anchored to the fiction of meritocracy."

== Awards and recognition ==
Gómez won the Andalusian Panorama award at the 2022 Seville European Film Festival with the documentary Como ardilla en el agua.

In 2014, she won the 40th María Agustina Literary Competition, and the following year the 13th Eugenio Carbajal Literary Competition. In 2016, she won the 33rd Jorge Guillén Literary Competition. In 2018, she received the first prize for narrative at Málaga Crea.

In 2023, she received the Miguel Hernández National Youth Poetry Award from the Ministry of Culture and Sport for her work Los trabajos sin Hércules (The Labors Without Hercules). The prize included a cash award of 30,000 euros.
