= Peter Arcidiacono =

American economist and econometrician (born 1971)

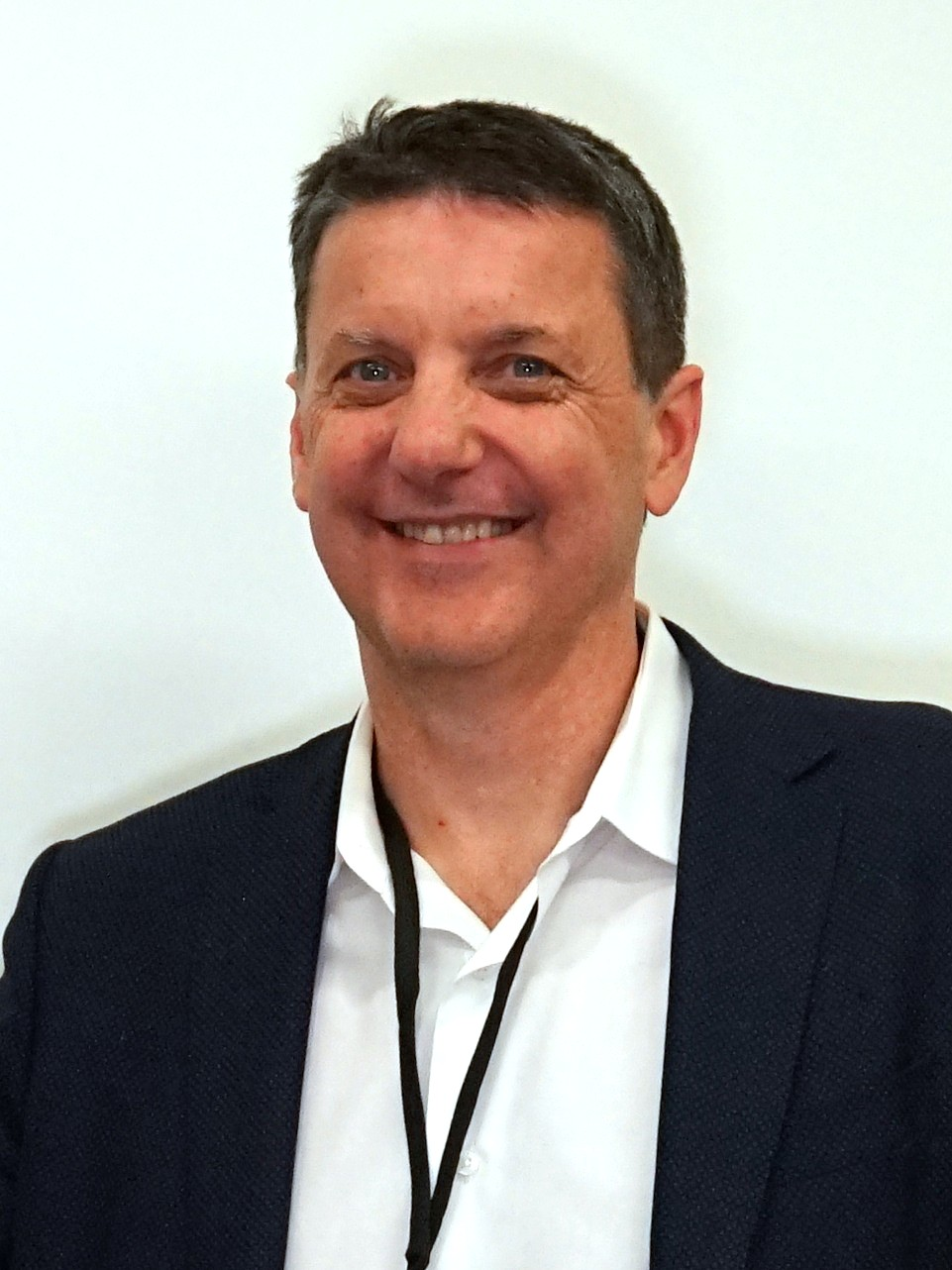
- Arcidiacono at ASSA 2026
- Born: 1971 (age 54–55); Oregon, U.S.
- Education: Willamette University (BS); University of Wisconsin–Madison (PhD)
- Known for: Affirmative action in higher education, structural estimation of dynamic discrete choice models, college major choice
- Children: 5
- Scientific career
- Fields: Microeconomics; Econometrics
- Workplaces: Duke University
- Doctoral advisor: John Kennan
- Website: Personal webpage

Peter S. Arcidiacono (born 1971) is an American economist and econometrician. After receiving his Ph.D. from the University of Wisconsin–Madison in 1999, he has taught at Duke University. He became a fellow of the Econometric Society in 2018.

Arcidiacono is known for his research contributions to three fields: affirmative action in higher education, structural estimation of dynamic discrete choice models, and college major choice, having written survey papers on each topic.

He has also published papers on peer effects, racial discrimination, the minimum wage, and marriage markets.

== Early life and career ==
Peter S. Arcidiacono was born in Oregon in 1971. He graduated from Tigard High School in 1990, completed a B.S. in economics in 1993 at Willamette University, and received his Ph.D. in economics from the University of Wisconsin–Madison in 1999 under the supervision of John Kennan.

Arcidiacono spent 27 years at Duke University (assistant professor, 1999–2006, associate professor, 2006–2010, and full professor, 2010–2026). He later joined Johns Hopkins University as a professor as well as Vice Dean of Faculty Affairs at the School of Government and Policy.

== Research and contributions ==
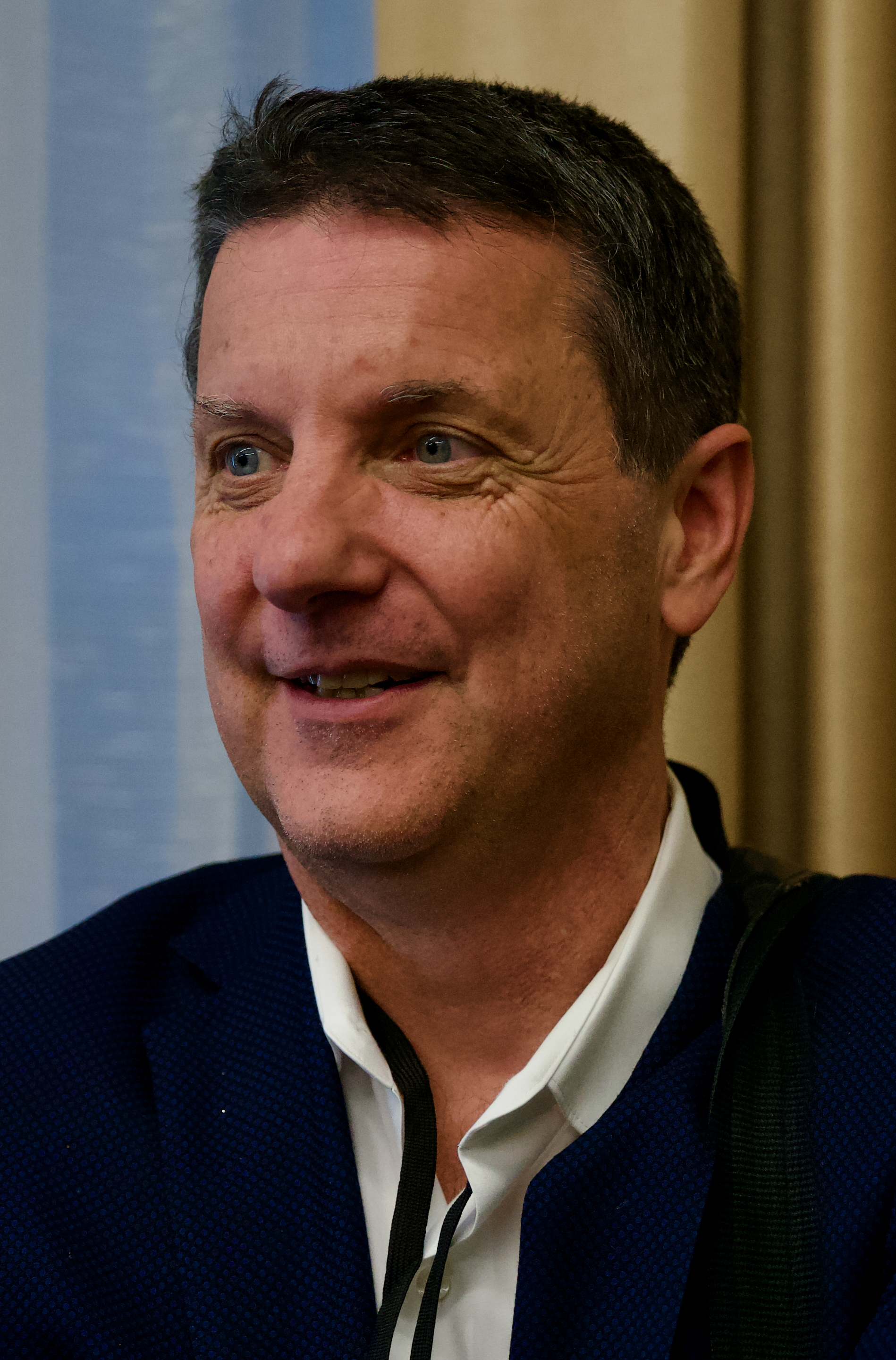
Arcidiacono in 2026

=== Affirmative action in higher education ===
Arcidiacono's research on affirmative action in higher education has centered on the theme that there exists a trade-off between institutional quality and the fit between a school and a student. Thus, students who are admitted under affirmative action may be made worse off due to lack of academic preparation.

Arcidiacono's expertise in this field led to his being hired as an expert witness in the Students for Fair Admissions v. Harvard lawsuit.

=== Dynamic discrete choice models ===
Arcidiacono, along with Robert A. Miller and John Bailey Jones, is the co-developer of using the Expectation–maximization algorithm and conditional choice probabilities (CCPs) to simplify the maximum likelihood estimation of structural econometric models. These methods allow a researcher to estimate the structural parameters of an economic model in stages because of additive separability in the objective function. Additionally, CCPs allow the researcher to estimate the structural parameters without having to fully solve the agent's dynamic decision problem. Both approaches result in substantial computational gains.

=== College major choice ===
Arcidiacono's work on college major choice has used dynamic discrete choice models to understand how much student decisions are driven by future labor market earnings versus other factors, such as academic ability, enjoyment of college coursework, or future occupational match. He has also used elicited expectations models to answer similar questions.

Arcidiacono's paper with Esteban Aucejo and Ken Spenner, entitled What happens after enrollment? An analysis of the time path of racial differences in GPA and major choice, analyzed data from Duke University and found that African American students switch out of more academically difficult majors at higher rates than their peers. However, the study found no gap in switching once adjusting for differences in academic background. Members of the Duke University Black Student Alliance protested the paper.

== Professional service ==
Arcidiacono has served in several editorial positions since 2007:

- Co-editor, Quantitative Economics, (July 2016–present)
- Foreign editor, Review of Economic Studies (October 2011 – October 2017)
- Associate editor, Journal of Applied Econometrics, (January 2007–present)
- Associate editor, AEJ: Applied Economics, (May 2009 – May 2012)
- Editor, Journal of Labor Economics, (July 2008 – July 2013)
- Co-editor, Economic Inquiry, (December 2007 – January 2011)

== University admissions lawsuits ==
Along with Richard D. Kahlenberg, Arcidiacono was hired by Students for Fair Admissions (SFFA) to serve as an expert witness in the Students for Fair Admissions v. President and Fellows of Harvard College lawsuit, which was heard by Allison D. Burroughs in Massachusetts federal district court in Boston in October 2018. Harvard hired Ruth Simmons and David Card as its expert witnesses.

Arcidiacono and Kahlenberg also served as expert witnesses for SFFA in the Students for Fair Admissions v. UNC lawsuit, with the defendants hiring Caroline Hoxby and Bridget Terry Long. That lawsuit has yet to receive a trial date.

=== Amicus briefs ===
On June 15, 2018, many documents surrounding the Harvard litigation (including the expert reports of Arcidiacono and Card) were publicly unsealed. About six weeks later, a group of economists filed an amicus brief in support of Arcidiacono's findings in his expert witness report. The economists involved were Michael Keane, Hanming Fang, Yingyao Hu, Glenn Loury, and Matthew Shum. The brief argued that Arcidiacono's findings were correct and that Card's analysis was wrong for three reasons:

1. Harvard's personal rating scores are biased against Asian-Americans, and thus should not be included in the admissions model
2. Interactions between race and disadvantaged status should be included in the admissions model
3. Applicants in special recruiting categories (such as recruited athletes or legacies) should be excluded from the admissions model because they are not similarly situated to other applicants

One month following, another group of economists filed an amicus brief in support of Card's analysis, claiming that the points made in the original brief were either mistaken or not germane to the question of racial discrimination. The brief also argued that Card's decision to not pool applicants across admissions cycles was correct. This group of economists consisted of Susan Dynarski, Harry J. Holzer, Hilary Hoynes, Guido Imbens, Alan B. Krueger, Helen F. Ladd, David S. Lee, Trevon D. Logan, Alexandre Mas, Michael McPherson, Jesse Rothstein, Cecilia Rouse, Robert M. Solow, Lowell J. Taylor, Sarah Turner, and Douglas Webber. An amended brief was filed shortly thereafter which added George Akerlof and Janet Yellen to the list.

== Personal life ==
Arcidiacono is a devout Catholic, husband, and father of five children. He has publicly discussed issues of being a Christian in academia.

== Selected publications ==
=== Affirmative action in higher education ===
- Arcidiacono, Peter; Lovenheim, Michael (2016). "Affirmative Action and the Quality-Fit Trade-Off". Journal of Economic Literature. 54 (1): 3–51. doi:10.1257/jel.54.1.3. S2CID 1876963.
- Arcidiacono, Peter (2005). "Affirmative Action in Higher Education: How Do Admission and Financial Aid Rules Affect Future Earnings?". Econometrica. 73 (5): 1477–1524. doi:10.1111/j.1468-0262.2005.00627.x. S2CID 13482712.
- Arcidiacono, Peter; Aucejo, Esteban M.; Fang, Hanming; Spenner, Kenneth I. (2011). "Does affirmative action lead to mismatch? A new test and evidence" (PDF). Quantitative Economics. 2 (3): 303–333. doi:10.3982/QE83.
- Arcidiacono, Peter; Aucejo, Esteban M.; Spenner, Ken (2012). "What happens after enrollment? An analysis of the time path of racial differences in GPA and major choice". IZA Journal of Labor Economics. 1 (5): 5. doi:10.1186/2193-8997-1-5. hdl:10.1186/2193-8997-1-5.

=== Estimation of dynamic discrete choice models ===
- Arcidiacono, Peter; Ellickson, Paul B. (2011). "Practical Methods for Estimation of Dynamic Discrete Choice Models". Annual Review of Economics. 3 (1): 363–394. doi:10.1146/annurev-economics-111809-125038. S2CID 17631350.
- Arcidiacono, Peter; Jones, John Bailey (2003). "Finite Mixture Distributions, Sequential Likelihood and the EM Algorithm". Econometrica. 71 (3): 933–946. doi:10.1111/1468-0262.00431. hdl:10161/1873.
- Arcidiacono, Peter; Miller, Robert A. (2011). "Conditional Choice Probability Estimation of Dynamic Discrete Choice Models With Unobserved Heterogeneity". Econometrica. 79 (6): 1823–1867. doi:10.3982/ECTA7743. S2CID 51845952.
- Arcidiacono, Peter; Bayer, Patrick; Blevins, Jason R.; Ellickson, Paul B. (2016). "Estimation of Dynamic Discrete Choice Models in Continuous Time with an Application to Retail Competition". Review of Economic Studies. 83 (3): 889–931. doi:10.1093/restud/rdw012. S2CID 204400538.

=== College major choice ===
- Altonji, Joseph G.; Arcidiacono, Peter; Maurel, Arnaud (2016). Handbook of the Economics of Education. Vol. 5. Elsevier. pp. 305–396. ISBN 978-0-444-63459-7.
- Arcidiacono, Peter (2004). "Ability sorting and the returns to college major". Journal of Econometrics. 121 (1–2): 343–375. doi:10.1016/j.jeconom.2003.10.010.
- Arcidiacono, Peter; Hotz, V. Joseph; Kang, Songman (2012). "Modeling college major choices using elicited measures of expectations and counterfactuals". Journal of Econometrics. 166 (1): 3–16. doi:10.1016/j.jeconom.2011.06.002.
- Arcidiacono, Peter; Hotz, V. Joseph; Aucejo, Esteban (2016). "University Differences in the Graduation of Minorities in STEM Fields: Evidence from California" (PDF). American Economic Review. 106 (3): 525–562. doi:10.1257/aer.20130626. PMC 6675032. PMID 31371833.
