= Eeckhout =

Surname list

Eeckhout is a Flemish surname. Notable people with the surname include:

- Gerbrand van den Eeckhout (1621–1674), Dutch painter
- Jacobus Josephus Eeckhout (1793–1861), Flemish painter
- Jan Eeckhout (active from 1992), Belgian economist
- Niko Eeckhout (born 1970), Belgian cyclist
- Susanna Eeckhout (c. 1630 – c. 1700), Dutch stage actress and ballet dancer
- Tom Eeckhout (born 1989), real name of singer Tom Dice
- Victor Eeckhout (1821–1879). Belgian painter
