= Barbara Rossi =

Barbara Rossi may refer to:

- Barbara Rossi (artist) (1940–2023), American artist from Chicago
- Barbara Rossi (economist) (born 1971), professor of economics at Pompeu Fabra University
- Barbara Rossi (tennis) (born 1961), Italian tennis player

== See also ==
- Barbara De Rossi (born 1960), Italian actress
