= Veldkamp =

Veldkamp is a surname. Notable people with the surname include:

- Bart Veldkamp (born 1967), Dutch speed skater
- Caspar Veldkamp (born 1964), Dutch politician
- Gerard Veldkamp (1921–1990), Dutch politician
- Jan Frederik Veldkamp (1941–2017), Dutch botanist
- Laura Veldkamp (born 1975), American economist
- Tjibbe Veldkamp (born 1962), Dutch children's writer

== See also ==
- Veldkamp's dwarf epauletted fruit bat
