= Isaac Baley Gaytán =

Mexican economist

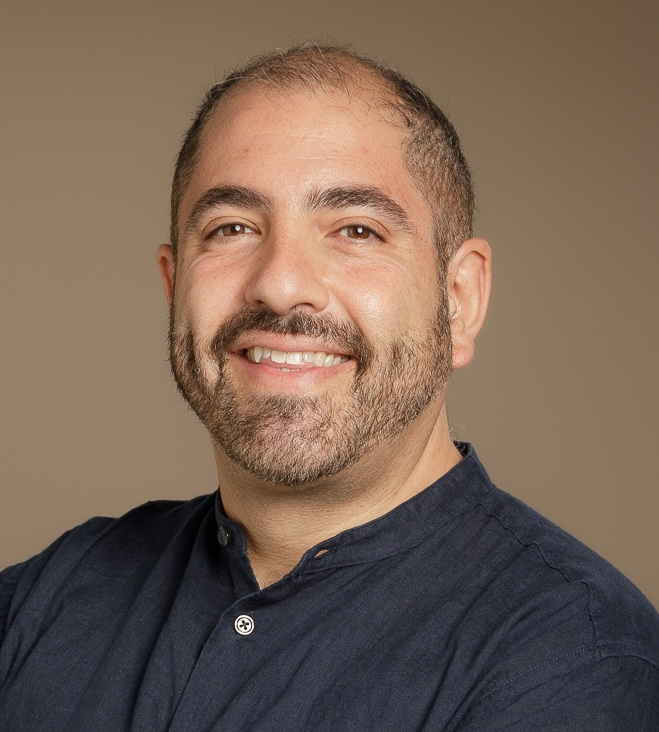

Academic background
- Education: New York University (PhD)

Academic work
- Discipline: Macroeconomics; information economics; firm dynamics
- Institutions: Universitat Pompeu Fabra
- Awards: European Research Council Starting Grant (2022); European Economic Association Exceptional Teaching Award (2022)
- Website: www.isaacbaley.com

Isaac Baley Gaytán (Mexico City, 1983) is a Mexican economist and Associate Professor of Economics at Universitat Pompeu Fabra (UPF) in Barcelona. He is affiliated with the Barcelona School of Economics (BSE) and the Centre de Recerca en Economia Internacional (CREI). His research focuses on macroeconomic fluctuations, firm dynamics, and the role of frictions and information in shaping aggregate outcomes.

He is coauthor, with Laura Veldkamp, of The Data Economy: Tools and Applications (Princeton University Press).

== Education ==
Baley earned bachelor's degrees in Economics and Applied Mathematics and a master's in Economic Theory from the Instituto Tecnológico Autónomo de México (ITAM). He received his PhD in Economics from New York University in 2015.

== Career ==
Baley joined the faculty of UPF in 2015, where he is an Associate Professor with tenure. He is also an Affiliated Professor at the Barcelona School of Economics and a Research Associate at CREI.

In 2022, he was awarded a European Research Council (ERC) Starting Grant for the project The Macroeconomic Effects of Corporate Tax Reforms. A BSE video feature summarized the project's aims and methods.

That same year, he received the European Economic Association's Exceptional Teaching Award (Junior).

== Research ==
Baley's research examines how micro-level frictions—such as adjustment costs, information constraints, and matching—impact the behavior of firms and households and influence aggregate dynamics. He has written on investment irreversibility, price-setting under information frictions, lumpy forecasts, international trade uncertainty, occupational mismatch, and human capital dynamics.

His articles have appeared in Econometrica, the Journal of Political Economy, the Review of Economic Studies, the Economic Journal, and the Journal of International Economics, among others.

== Publications ==
=== Books ===
- Baley, Isaac; Veldkamp, Laura (2025). The Data Economy: Tools and Applications. Princeton University Press. ISBN 9780691256726.

=== Selected articles ===
- Baley, Isaac; Blanco, Andrés (2021). "Aggregate Dynamics in Lumpy Economies." Econometrica 89(3): 1235–1264.
- Baley, Isaac; Figueiredo, Ana; Ulbricht, Robert (2022). "Mismatch Cycles." Journal of Political Economy 130(11).
- Ljungqvist, Lars; Sargent, Thomas; Baley, Isaac (2024). "Returns to Labor Mobility." The Economic Journal 135(666).
- Baley, Isaac; Blanco, Andrés (forthcoming). "The Macroeconomics of Irreversibility." Review of Economic Studies.
