= College of Economists of Catalonia =

- Col·legi d'Economistes de Catalunya
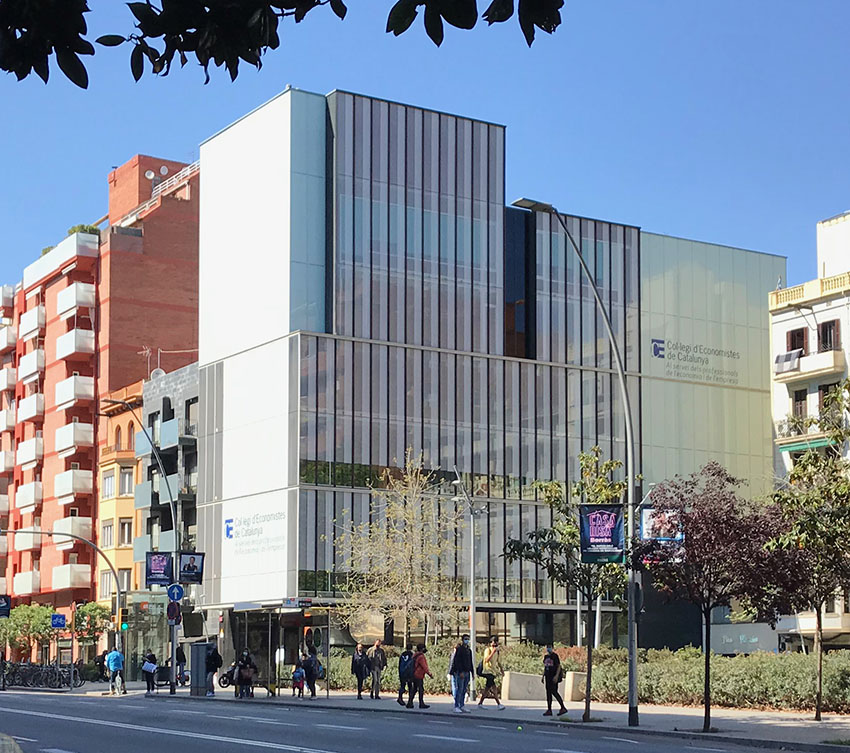
- Headquarters of the College
- Formation: 2014
- Founded at: Barcelona
- Purpose: promotion of economists profession
- Headquarters: Plaça de Gal·la Placídia, 32
- Location: Barcelona, Spain
- Region served: Catalonia
- Services: professional services
- Members: 7,800 (2022)
- Official language: catalan language
- Chairperson: Carles Puig de Travy (2022-)
- Award: Creu de Sant Jordi (1999)
- Website: www.coleconomistes.cat

The College of Economists of Catalonia, officially named in Catalan Col·legi d'Economistes de Catalunya, based in Barcelona, is a professional public law corporation, which in 2022 had more than 7,800 members and 1,500 related companies and offices dedicated to the different aspects of the economy, business and entrepreneurship.

== History ==
The College of Economists of Catalonia is the result of the unification of the former College of Economists and the extinct Colleges of Mercantile and Business Degrees of Barcelona, Girona, Lleida and Tarragona as well as the Council of Associations of Mercantile and Business Degrees of Catalonia. The unified organisation was formally established on October 1, 2014, when the Extraordinary Constituent Assembly took place.

Initially, this entity was a section of the College of Graduates of the political, economic and commercial sciences specialties in Barcelona, in 1954. Later, it was segregated as a proper college of economists from Catalonia and the Balearic Islands with branches in Tarragona, Lleida and Girona. The delegation of the Balearic Islands was segregated in 1978.

The college has had as deans Joaquim Buxó-Dulce de Abaigar, Josep Maria Berini, Llorenç Gascón, Lluís Burgués, Francesc Raventós, Rafael Suñol, Francesc Santacana, Andreu Morillas, Valentí Pich, Jordi Conejos, Artur Saurí, Joan B. Casas (2008–2018), Anton Gasol (2018–2021), Oriol Amat (2021) and, from November 2021, Carles Puig de Travy.

== Services ==
The organisation is configured as a training and professional updating center and as a forum of opinion open to society in general, through the organization of activities and the provision of services. As the highest representative body of the profession in Catalonia, the College of Economists of Catalonia has as its main objective to promote the development of professions linked to the economy and business and to ensure that professional activities offer society guarantees of quality and competence. The college has offices in Barcelona (Plaça de Gal·la Placídia, 32), Girona (Carrer Joan Maragall 44–46), Lleida (Carrer Pere Cabrera 16) and Tarragona (Rambla Nova 58–60).

== Honorary members ==
Every year the College of Economists of Catalonia distinguishes the professional career of a registered economist for his/her contribution to the profession and to economic science:

Pasqual Maragall Mira, Narcís Serra Serra, Andreu Mas Colell, Joaquim Muns Albuixech, Josep M. Bricall Masip, Amadeu Petitbó Juan, Antoni Serra Ramoneda, Ernest Lluch Martín, Josep Oliu Creus, Jacint Ros Hombravella, Guillem López Casasnovas, Francesc Granell Trias, Antonio Argandoña Rámiz, Mercè Sala Schnorkowski, Martí Parellada Sabata, Isidre Fainé Casas, Artur Saurí del Río, Lluís Barbé Duran, Alfred Pastor Bodmer, Joan Canals Oliva, Joan Hortalà Arau, Enric Genescà Garrigosa, Carles A. Gasòliba Böhm, Antoni Castells Oliveres, Salvador Alemany Mas, Teresa Garcia-Milà, Josep Oliver Alonso, Joan Tugores Ques, Montserrat Casanovas Ramon, Artur Mas i Gavarró and Albert Carreras de Odriozola.

On the other hand, it also annually awards the distinction of honorary member to professionals in disciplines other than economics but who make outstanding contributions to the improvement of the profession and the economy: Joan Sardà Dexeus, Fabià Estapé Rodríguez, Josep Lluís Sureda Carrión, Romà Perpinyà Grau, Ramon Trias Fargas, Jordi Nadal Oller, Rafael Termes Carreró, Francesc Cabana Vancells, Josep Fontana Lázaro, Anna Cabré Pla, Josep Maria Vegara Carrió, Albert Vilalta González, Ramon Folch Guillén, Mariano Marzo Carpio, Manuel Castells Oliván, Salvador Anton Clavé, Marta Sanz-Solé, Ramon Alcoberro Pericay, Cristina Gallach Figueras, Juan Ignacio Cirac Sasturain i Olga Pané Mena.

== Revista econòmica de Catalunya ==
The Revista Econòmica de Catalunya has been published since 1986 entirely in Catalan language and is an instrument that the College of Economists of Catalonia contributes to society when deepening knowledge of economic and business reality in all its manifestations. The Revista Econòmica de Catalunya, published in Catalan, collects contributions from both the analysis side and the comparative experiences of economic policy and the business world. It can be consulted in open access on the portal of Catalan Open Access Journals (RACO).

In 1999 the magazine received the Creu de Sant Jordi for contributing to the use and promotion of Catalan language in the financial and business spheres and for the publication of theoretical and practical articles on the Catalan economy.
