= Yoosoon Chang =

Yoosoon Chang is an American economist who is a professor in the Department of Economics at Indiana University Bloomington. Her area of expertise is application of a wide range of econometric approaches to time series and panel data in largely macroeconomic and financial contexts.

She serves on the board of editors for both the Journal of Economic Literature (from 2022 to the present) and the Journal of Applied Econometrics (2022–present).

== Selected publications ==
- Chang, Yoosoon, Yongok Choi, and Joon Y. Park. "A new approach to model regime switching." Journal of Econometrics 196.1 (2017): 127–143.
- Chang, Y. (2002). Nonlinear IV unit root tests in panels with cross-sectional dependency. Journal of econometrics, 110(2), 261–292.
- Chang, Y., & Park, J. Y. (2003). A sieve bootstrap for the test of a unit root. Journal of Time Series Analysis, 24(4), 379–400.

== Faculty page ==
https://economics.indiana.edu/about/faculty/chang-yoosoon.html
