= The Data Economy: Tools and Applications =

2025 economics textbook

- Cover
- Author: Isaac Baley; Laura Veldkamp
- Language: English
- Subject: Economics, data economy, macroeconomics, microeconomics
- Publisher: Princeton University Press
- Publication date: January 7, 2025
- Publication place: United States
- Pages: 320
- ISBN: 978-0-691-25672-6
- Preceded by: Information Choice in Macroeconomics and Finance (2011)

The Data Economy: Tools and Applications is a 2025 economics textbook by Isaac Baley and Laura Veldkamp. The book presents mathematical models and analytical frameworks for understanding data as an economic asset in modern economies. The authors treat data as a manufactured input shaped by economic incentives and examine its role in reducing uncertainty, creating feedback loops in business operations, and transforming market dynamics. The textbook includes chapters on statistical tools, data acquisition strategies, market power, platform economics, and policy implications including privacy concerns.

== Summary ==
The book studies the economic implications of data, defined as information that has been digitized for computer processing. Baley and Veldkamp present mathematical models and analytical frameworks that academic economists use to understand the data economy. They treat data as a manufactured input shaped by economic incentives rather than as exogenous technological progress, and emphasize its role in enabling parties to react more quickly and precisely to one another.

In the introductory chapter, Baley and Veldkamp establish data's distinctive characteristics, including its function as a prediction device, its nature as a by-product of economic activity, and its capacity to create feedback loops in business operations. Chapter 2 provides a comprehensive collection of statistical tools and methods, including Bayesian updating and Kalman filtering techniques, that serve as the analytical foundation for subsequent chapters.

In the third chapter, the authors examine data sources and accumulation dynamics, and then distinguish between first-party, second-party, and third-party data, as well as between passive and active data acquisition. The fourth chapter analyzes how different types of economic shocks affect data acquisition and predictability. Chapters 5 and 6 explore strategic behavior in data markets, examining how firms' data acquisition choices depend on whether their actions exhibit strategic complementarity or substitutability with competitors.

The middle sections investigate market dynamics, with Chapter 7 analyzing how data holdings can enhance market power and Chapter 8 examining platforms' role as intermediaries in the data economy.

Chapter 9 returns to firm-level analysis, exploring the feedback loop between data accumulation and profit maximization under different interpretations of data's economic function.

In chapter 10, Baley and Veldkamp address the challenges of measuring and valuing data, and then in the eleventh chapter, they consider normative policy questions, including privacy concerns, welfare implications, and concepts such as statistical inference externality—when data about one person provides signals about others with similar characteristics.

== Reviews ==
Portuguese economist Orlando Gomes praised the work as "high-quality state-of-the-art research" and "essential reading for any scientist interested in the economics of data." Gomes said the book successfully combined different streams of literature on information choice and helped give structure to partial knowledge on imperfect information. He found the book well-structured and well-written, said its value is in bridging compartmentalized research fields and providing sophisticated statistical tools for macroeconomic assessment of data's impact. Gomes characterized it as "a solid example of how data is making a triumphal entrance into the realm of economic science" and said that the authors offered "an important contribution to the advancement of our understanding of what the data economy is, the challenges it poses, and how it is likely to evolve."

British economist and researcher Lavan Mahadeva characterized the book as "well organised and well written" but cautioned that general readers would not find it the best introduction to data's transformative effects on the world. Mahadeva emphasized that the book's purpose was "to explain how academic economists have modelled the data economy," making it most suitable for students seeking to organize their thoughts around a mathematical modeling framework. Mahadeva said that the book reveals economists are "playing catch up" with understanding the data economy, and observed that while ten years ago most economists would have predicted welfare-improving outcomes from increased data sharing, current understanding is more nuanced. He liked the book's introduction of concepts like "statistical inference externality" but criticized its scope, and thought that it omitted important considerations such as how public data affects political choices over economic policies and how the data economy influences time allocation. Mahadeva wrote: "the standard production function of labour and capital making widgets looks outdated after reading this."
