= Method of simulated moments =

In econometrics, the method of simulated moments (MSM) (also called simulated method of moments) is a structural estimation technique introduced by Daniel McFadden. It extends the generalized method of moments to cases where theoretical moment functions cannot be evaluated directly, such as when moment functions involve high-dimensional integrals. MSM's earliest and principal applications have been to research in industrial organization, after its development by Ariel Pakes, David Pollard, and others, though applications in consumption are emerging. Although the method requires the user to specify the distribution from which the simulations are to be drawn, this requirement can be relaxed through the use of an entropy maximizing distribution.

== GMM v.s. MSM ==
- $\hat{\beta}_{GMM}=\operatorname{argmin}\,m(x,\beta)'Wm(x,\beta)$,

where $m(x,\beta)$ is the moment condition and W is a matrix. Using the optimal W matrix leads to efficient estimator.

- $\hat{\beta}_{MSM}=\operatorname{argmin}\,\hat{m}(x,\beta)'W\hat{m}(x,\beta)$,

where $\hat{m}(x,\beta)$ is the simulated moment condition and $E[\hat{m}(x,\beta)]=m(x,\beta)$

== MSM v.s. Indirect Inference ==
MSM is a special case of Indirect Inference. While Indirect Inference allows the researcher to use any of the features of sample statistics as a basis for comparison of moments and data, the name MSM applies only when those statistics are moments of the data, i.e. averages, across the sample of functions defined for a single sample element.
