= Teresa Garcia-Milà =

Catalan economist and academic

- Born: Maria Teresa Garcia-Milà i Lloveras; 1955 (age 70–71); Barcelona
- Education: University of Barcelona, University of Minnesota (PhD)
- Occupation: Economist
- Known for: President of Cercle d'Economia

Teresa Garcia-Milà i Lloveras (born in Barcelona in 1955) is a Catalan economist with expertise in Macroeconomics and Public Finance. She is the President of the Cercle d'Economia. She is also the Chair of the Barcelona School of Economics (BSE) Board of Trustees.

== Career ==
Teresa Garcia-Milà graduated from the University of Barcelona in 1977 and obtained her PhD in Economics from the University of Minnesota in 1987. From 1985 to 1987 she was a professor at the State University of New York and later at the Autonomous University of Barcelona between 1987 and 1990. In 1990, she moved to Pompeu Fabra University (UPF), where she was a Professor of Economics from 1995-2025, Dean of the Faculty of Economic and Business Sciences of the UPF between 1995 and 2000, Vice-Rector for Science Policy between 2009 and 2011, and Director of the Department of Economics and Business from 2011 to 2012. Currently, she is an Honorary Professor of UPF and a BSE Emeritus Affiliated Professor.

Garcia-Milà was also an Associate Researcher of the Center for Research in International Economics (CREI) and the Institute for Economic Analysis (IAE) of the CSIC.

She is a past president of the Spanish Economic Association (2014) and of the Commission of Lecturers and Collaborating Professors of the Agency for the Quality of the University System of Catalonia (2003-05).

In addition to her academic career, Garcia-Milà has served on the boards of Banco Sabadell, Enagás, and Vueling. Currently, she is Chair of the Board of the Barcelona School of Economics and a member of the board of Repsol and the executive committee of Barcelona Global.

=== Research ===
Teresa Garcia-Milà's research focuses on Macroeconomics and Public Finance, particularly on the impact of public investment on economic growth, and on how different fiscal structures and models of fiscal federalism affect economic growth, resource distribution, and economic well-being. Her research has been published in The Economic Journal, The Review of Economics and Statistics, and Regional Science and Urban Economics, among others.

== Awards and Honors ==
In 2016, the College of Economists of Catalonia named her a Member of Merit.

In 2018, she was awarded the Narcís Monturiol Medal for scientific and technological merit.

In 2025 she was included in the Forbes list of the 100 most influential women in Catalonia.
