= Mar Reguant =

Spanish and American energy economist

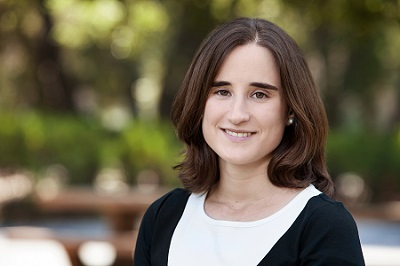
Reguant in 2014

Mar Reguant Ridó (born 1984) is a Spanish and American economist specializing in energy economics, and especially the environmental costs of pollution from electricity generation. She is an ICREA Researcher at the Institute for Economic Analysis of the Spanish National Research Council in Barcelona, an affiliated professor at the Barcelona School of Economics, a part-time professor at Northwestern University in Chicago, vice president of climate change at the Center for Economic and Policy Research in Washington, D.C., and a research associate of the National Bureau of Economic Research in Cambridge, Massachusetts.

== Education and career ==
Reguant was born in 1984 in Súria; she is a citizen of Spain and the US. After earning a llicenciatura in economics from the Autonomous University of Barcelona in 2006, she went to the Massachusetts Institute of Technology for graduate study, and completed a Ph.D. in economics in 2011. Her dissertation, Essays in Energy and Environmental Markets, was jointly supervised by Nancy Rose and Stephen P. Ryan.

She became an assistant professor at Stanford University in 2011, and a researcher for the National Bureau of Economic Research in 2012. She moved from Stanford to Northwestern University in 2015, was tenured there as an associate professor in 2017, and was promoted to full professor in 2022. Meanwhile, she became a research affiliate of the Center for Economic and Policy Research in 2016, and a research fellow of the Barcelona School of Economics in 2022. Also in 2022, she became vice-president for climate change at the Center for Economic and Policy Research. She added her position as ICREA Researcher at the Institute for Economic Analysis in 2023.

== Recognition ==
In 2017, Reguant was the recipient of the 16th Banco Sabadell Foundation Award for Economic Research. She was a 2019 recipient of the Presidential Early Career Award for Scientists and Engineers, and a recipient of the 2023 Catalan National Research Prize for Young Talent. She was named as a Fellow of the Econometric Society in 2024.
