= Information Choice in Macroeconomics and Finance =

2011 book by Laura Veldkamp

- Cover
- Author: Laura Veldkamp
- Language: English
- Subject: Economics, finance, information choice
- Publisher: Princeton University Press
- Publication date: September 11, 2011
- Publication place: United States
- Pages: 184
- ISBN: 978-0-691-14220-3
- Followed by: The Data Economy: Tools and Applications (2025)

Information Choice in Macroeconomics and Finance is a 2011 graduate-level textbook by American economist Laura Veldkamp. The book introduces the study of information choice, a field that examines how economic agents decide what information to acquire and how these decisions affect market outcomes and macroeconomic dynamics. Rather than assuming what market participants know, the framework presented in the book models information as an endogenous choice variable. The text covers applications in monetary economics, portfolio theory, business cycles, and asset pricing, and includes mathematical tools for building models with information frictions.

== Summary ==
Veldkamp examines how economic agents select and process information when making decisions, and how these choices affect macroeconomic and financial outcomes. The work presents a theoretical framework in which information acquisition is treated as an endogenous choice variable rather than an exogenous constraint, drawing on research primarily from the 2000s.

The book is structured in four parts, with each chapter including exercises suitable for graduate courses. Part I (Chapters 1-4) establishes the theoretical foundations for studying information choice and introduces mathematical tools including Bayesian updating techniques and methods for measuring information flows. Veldkamp distinguishes between passive learning, where agents receive information without deliberate effort, and active learning, where agents choose which information to acquire.

Part II (Chapters 5 and 6) analyzes information choice in contexts characterized by strategic complementarities, where agents benefit from coordinating their actions. The author covers the welfare effects of public information disclosure, the role of transparency in central banking, and the emergence of price stickiness through informational frictions. Veldkamp demonstrates how heterogeneous information combined with coordination motives can generate persistent deviations from full-information equilibria, though she does not provide extensive technical derivations, requiring readers to work through these independently.

Part III (Chapters 7-9) addresses environments with strategic substitutabilities, particularly in financial markets where agents prefer to take positions contrary to others. Here, Veldkamp investigates how information acquisition decisions lead to portfolio concentration, market segmentation, and asset price volatility. She also examines how information can function as an aggregate shock in business cycle models.

In the fourth part (Chapter 10), Veldkamp discusses empirical methods for testing information-based theories. She presents techniques for inferring information sets from observable variables, including forecast dispersion, covariance structures, profit realizations, and market microstructure measures such as bid-ask spreads and the probability of informed trading.

== Reviews ==
German economist Christian Merkl praised the work as "well structured and well written" and noted that it successfully synthesized different streams of literature on information choice based on state-of-the-art research from the previous decade. Merkl found the book valuable for providing structure to his understanding of imperfect information models, having previously worked exclusively with perfect information assumptions in his own macroeconomic research. While Merkl acknowledged that the text offered "an excellent guideline for PhD students and researchers," he expressed reservations about two aspects: the lack of empirical validation for some information-based theories (citing recent microeconometric evidence that contradicted sticky information models), and his skepticism about whether information acquisition constituted the primary driver of major macroeconomic phenomena. He suggested that other factors, such as institutional features and labor market frictions, might provide equally compelling explanations. Despite these concerns, Merkl said that "Veldkamp does an excellent job combining different streams of the literature of information choice" and recommended the book to readers interested in the field.

Hayoung Gim praised how the book synthesized information theories while studying macroeconomic and finance models where agents actively choose what information to acquire. Gim appreciated how Veldkamp focused on Bayesian learning and provided both theoretical foundations (in early chapters) and practical applications (in later chapters) across various economic fields including monetary economics, portfolio theory, and asset pricing. He liked the book's introduction of recent research on rational inattention and information markets, and thought it would serve graduate students well, especially those seeking dissertation subjects. However, Gim warned that readers would need "solid grounding in mathematics because the author relies heavily upon both mathematical formulae and processes." He said that the book strengthened researchers' ability to choose information for modeling and provided valuable tools for applied theories, making it a worthy addition to the field of information theory despite its mathematical demands.
