= Oriol Amat =

Catalan economist and professor

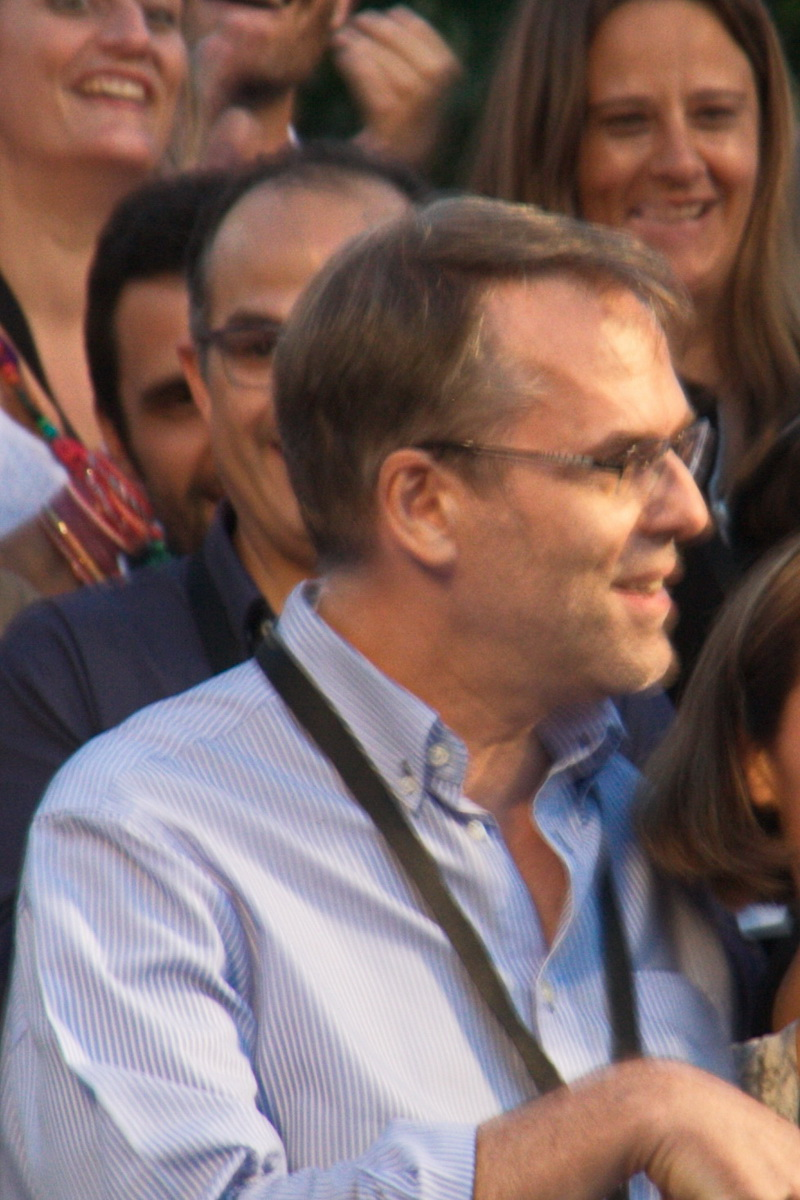
- Oriol Amat in 2015
- Born: March 14, 1957 (age 68); Barcelona, Catalonia, Spain
- Occupations: Economist; University professor
- Title: Full professor at Pompeu Fabra University
- Website: www.oriolamat.cat

Oriol Amat is a Catalan economist. He has served as Rector of Pompeu Fabra University in Barcelona from 2021 to 2023. He is also Full Professor of Financial Economics and Accounting at the same university since 2001.

== Academic background and university management ==
He studied at Autonomous University of Barcelona (PhD in Business Administration and Bachelor's degree in the same speciality), at ESADE (Bachelor's degree in Business Administration and MBA) and at the Stockholm School of Economics (International Teachers Programme). He has spent time at various reference centres, such as Linkoping University (Sweden), Massey University (New Zealand), Université de Montpellier (France) and Diego Portales University (Chile).

As a professor at UPF since 1992, he has always been interested in the four main dimensions of academic life: research, knowledge transfer, teaching and management.

His lines of research include the analysis of the success factors of organizations and the ethical aspects of finance. He has directed more than fifteen theses and is the author of scientific articles and more than forty books, including Informe annual de l’empresa catalana [Annual Report of the Catalan companies] (2020), L’Ampolla mig plena: Aprendre de les crisis i dels que ho fan millor [The half-full bottle: Learning from crises and from those who made it better] (2020), Detecting accounting fraud before it's too late (2019), Renda Bàsica Universal: Anàlisi d’una proposta disruptiva [Universal Basic Income: Analysis of a disruptive proposal] (2019), Valoració i compravenda d’empreses [Valuation and sale of companies] (2018). Some of his books have been translated into several languages (French, English, Portuguese…). He also collaborates and is a member of the editorial board of several international scientific publications.

In the field of management, he has held various positions. At UPF, he has been dean of the UPF Barcelona School of Management (2018-2021), director of the Department of Economics and Business (2003-2005), vice-rector for Economics, Information Systems and Services (1997-2001) and, specifically in the teaching field, he was director of the Centre for Teaching Quality and Innovation (2006-2011)

== Other activities ==
From the beginning of his professional career, he has actively collaborated with social institutions. He has been the dean of the College of Economists of Catalonia, a member of the advisory board of the Barcelona Chamber of Commerce and PIMEC; and member of the Catalonia 2022 working group, which designs the post-Covid strategy. He is also member of the Spanish Sustainable Finance Academic Forum. He has been the founder and president of the Catalan Accounting and Management Association (2014-2018), member of the Parliament of Catalonia (2015-2017), member of the Advisory Board for the Reactivation and Growth of Catalonia (2011-2015) and Director of the National Securities Market Commission (2011-2015), among others.
