= Maria Petrova (economist) =

Russian economist

Maria Alexeevna Petrova is a Russian economist who works in Spain as a research professor at the Institute for Political Economy of the Catalan Institution for Research and Advanced Studies, as an affiliated professor with the Barcelona School of Economics, and as an associate professor at Pompeu Fabra University. Her research in applied microeconomics and media economics examines the effects of media and information flow on economics and politics.

== Education and career ==
Petrova graduated from Moscow State University in 2002 with a diploma in applied mathematics (the Russian equivalent of a master's degree). She earned a master's degree in economics in 2004 from the New Economic School in Moscow, and then went to the Harvard Kennedy School for doctoral study in political economy and government, completing her Ph.D. in 2008. Her dissertation, Political Economy of Media Capture, was supervised by Kenneth Shepsle.

She returned to the New Economic School as an assistant professor in 2008, becoming associate professor there and in 2012 directing the Center for New Media and Society. She moved to her present positions at the Catalan Institution for Research and Advanced Studies and Barcelona School of Economics in 2013. Initially a researcher at the Institute for Political Economy, she became ICREA Research Professor in 2013. She added a tenured associate professorship at Pompeu Fabra University in 2016.

== Recognition ==
Petrova was elected as a Fellow of the Econometric Society in 2024.
