= Barcelona School of Economics =

Research institution in Barcelona

- Type: University Research Institute
- Established: 2006
- Founder: Andreu Mas-Colell
- Chairperson: Teresa Garcia-Milà
- Director: Joan Monràs
- Location: Barcelona, Catalonia, Spain; 41°23′24.32″N 2°11′27.35″E
- Website: bse.eu

The Barcelona School of Economics (BSE) is an institute for research and graduate education in economics, finance, data science, and the social sciences located in Barcelona, Spain. It was founded as a partnership among four academic units: Universitat Pompeu Fabra (UPF) and Universitat Autònoma de Barcelona (UAB), together with the Center for Research in International Economics (CREI) and Institute for Economic Analysis (IAE-CSIC). In research-based rankings, BSE is widely recognized as one of the world's leading economics institutions, while UPF is ranked among the top departments in Europe in Economics & Econometrics. BSE was founded in 2006 by economist and microeconomic theorist Andreu Mas-Colell.

BSE offers master's programs and is part of a wider doctoral training community through two Economics PhD programs co-organized with UPF and UAB, respectively. Master's degrees are awarded by the respective universities; the largest program, the master's degree in economics, is awarded by Universitat Pompeu Fabra.

The BSE Summer Forum is a major annual conference where economists present their latest work across dozens of topics in Economics research.

The Calvó-Armengol International Prize is awarded every two years by BSE and the Government of Andorra to a researcher in Economics or social sciences who is not older than 40 years old for significant contributions to the theory and comprehension of the mechanisms of social interaction.

In addition to two economics PhD programs through UPF and UAB, BSE's educational offerings include master's degrees, summer schools, executive education courses, and in-company training. The Barcelona School of Economics is accredited by the Catalan University Quality Assurance Agency (AQU).

== History ==
Established as the Barcelona Graduate School of Economics (Barcelona GSE), the institution was legally recognized by the Government of Catalonia in October 2006 as a foundation dedicated to higher education.

The School was created with the objective to foster scientific cooperation between four existing academic and research units in Barcelona:

- Autonomous University of Barcelona — Unit of Economic Analysis
- Pompeu Fabra University — Department of Economics and Business
- Centre for Research in International Economics
- Institute for Economic Analysis (part of the Spanish National Research Council)

== Name change ==
The institution changed its name to Barcelona School of Economics in 2021. It was formerly known as the Barcelona Graduate School of Economics, or Barcelona GSE.

== Board of Trustees ==
BSE's Board of Trustees includes both private and public institutions, as well as distinguished academics who serve in a personal capacity.

== Scientific Council ==
The BSE Scientific Council is a group of distinguished economists who provide strategic guidance to BSE's leadership team. Members meet in Barcelona periodically to analyze BSE education programs, research initiatives, and institutional development.

The members are distinguished international economists including Nobel Laureates, Clarivate Citation Laureates, Fellows of the Econometric Society, and Fellows of the American Academy of Arts and Sciences.

Chair of the BSE Scientific Council

The first chair of the Scientific Council was Hugo Sonnenschein (1940–2021), President Emeritus of the University of Chicago, who held the position from 2008 until 2021.

The current chair is Matthew O. Jackson, Professor of Economics at Stanford University.

Current Members of the Barcelona School of Economics Scientific Council

- Philippe Aghion, Collège de France and London School of Economics, Nobel Laureate
- Pol Antràs, Harvard University
- Aloisio Araujo, IMPA and Fundação Getulio Vargas (Rio de Janeiro)
- Manuel Arellano, CEMFI
- Orley Ashenfelter, Princeton University
- Chong-En Bai, Tsinghua University
- Oriana Bandiera, London School of Economics
- Marianne Bertrand, University of Chicago
- Richard Blundell, University College London
- Olympia Bover, CEMFI
- Janet Currie, Princeton University
- Partha Dasgupta, University of Cambridge
- Mathias Dewatripont Université Libre de Bruxelles
- Darrell Duffie, Stanford Graduate School of Business
- Raquel Fernández, New York University
- Pinelopi Goldberg, Yale University
- Michael Greenstone, University of Chicago
- Oliver Hart, Harvard University, Nobel Laureate
- James J. Heckman, University of Chicago, Nobel Laureate
- Bengt Holmström, MIT, Nobel Laureate
- Guido W. Imbens, Stanford Graduate School of Business, Nobel Laureate
- Timothy Kehoe, University of Minnesota
- Anne Krueger, The Johns Hopkins University
- Eliana La Ferrara, Harvard Kennedy School
- Eric S. Maskin, Harvard University Nobel Laureate
- Preston McAfee, Google
- Roger Myerson, University of Chicago Nobel Laureate
- Juan Pablo Nicolini, United States Federal Reserve Bank of Minneapolis
- Lucrezia Reichlin, London Business School
- Hélène Rey, London Business School
- John Roberts, Stanford University
- Alvin Roth, Stanford University, Nobel Laureate
- Nancy Stokey, University of Chicago
- Fabrizio Zilibotti, University of Zürich

== Research ==
One of BSE's main objectives is to make Barcelona a leading community in Economics research worldwide.

=== Research rankings ===
The Barcelona School of Economics research community constitutes one of the leading clusters of economics research in Europe. It has been ranked by RePEc among the top 15 of Economics Departments in the world, the top 10 in Europe, and as the best in Spain.

=== Severo Ochoa Research Excellence accreditations ===
In 2011, BSE was distinguished as one of only eight Centers of Research Excellence with an international impact in the framework of the Severo Ochoa Research Excellence Program, which promotes frontier research and distinguish those institutions that are defining the global scientific debate.

BSE is the only center focused on Economics and the social sciences to receive the Severo Ochoa accreditation in all four editions of the program (2012–15, 2016–19, 2020–24, and 2025–2031)

=== Research areas ===
- Behavioral and Experimental Economics
- Business Economics
- Competition Economics
- Development Economics
- Economic History
- Energy Economics
- Environmental Economics
- Financial Economics
- Game Theory
- Gender Economics
- Growth and Development
- Health Economics
- Industrial Organization
- International Economics
- Labor Economics
- Macroeconomics
- Microeconomics
- Monetary and Fiscal Policy
- Political Economy
- Public Economics
- Social Choice and Mechanism Design
- Statistics, Econometrics and Quantitative Methods

== Faculty ==
=== Affiliated professors ===
Affiliated Professors of the Barcelona School of Economics are tenured or tenure-track faculty members from the BSE academic units.

Among the affiliated professors there are Fellows of the Econometric Society, Fellows of the European Economic Association, Research Fellows of the Centre for Economic Policy and Research (CEPR), and Research Fellows of CESifo. They publish in the leading journals of Economics and many of the journals of the different subfields of the discipline. They also serve as coeditors and associate editors of these journals.

At present there are around 150 BSE Affiliated Professors, some of whom have been appointed as BSE Research Professors by the board of trustees in order to attract, retain, and recognize top scientists in the BSE research community:

- José Apesteguia
- Isaac Baley Gaytán
- Fernando Broner
- Davide Debortoli
- Jan Eeckhout
- Ruben Enikolopov
- Jordi Galí
- José García-Montalvo
- Flip Klijn
- Gábor Lugosi
- Albert Marcet
- Alberto Martin
- Massimo Motta
- Rosemarie Nagel
- Antonio Penta
- Maria Petrova
- Mar Reguant
- Marta Reynal-Querol
- Barbara Rossi
- Jaume Ventura

== Campuses ==
The Barcelona School of Economics has two campuses:

- Bellaterra campus (UAB)
- Ciutadella campus (UPF)
