= Rey Jaime I Awards =

Awards ceremony recognizing achievements in research and entrepreneurship

The Rey Jaime I Awards (lit. 'King James I Awards'; Spanish: Premios Rey Jaime I, Catalan: Premis Rei Jaume I) are Spanish awards given annually to recognize achievements in research and entrepreneurship. Each award includes 100,000 euros and a gold medal as well as a diploma. Awards are given for high-quality work done in Spain, by candidates who live in Spain or have done most of their research work in Spain.

== Description ==
The Rey Jaime I Awards were created in 1989 to promote scientific development in Spain while encouraging collaboration among scientific and business enterprises. They recognize achievements in research and entrepreneurship. Each award includes 100,000 euros and a gold medal as well as a diploma. Awards are given for high-quality work done in Spain, by candidates who live in Spain or have done most of their research work in Spain.

The awards are granted by the Fundación Rei Jaume I, whose honorary president is the King of Spain Felipe VI. The Fundación Rei Jaume I was created in 1989 by the Valencian Government and the Valencian Foundation for Advanced Studies, who organize and promote the awards.

The award was first given only in the "Basic Research" area. Later, more areas have been added such as: Basic Research, Economy, Medical Research, Environmental Protection, New Technologies, Urbanism, Landscape and Sustainability and Entrepreneurship.

Juries awarding the prize typically include several Nobel Laureates, who travel to Valencia to take part in the deliberations.

== Recent events ==
For the 2020 prize-giving ceremony in Valencia, King Felipe VI was unable to participate due to quarantine for COVID-19, but his wife Queen Letizia took part in the event. The queen, who before her marriage was a news anchor at Spanish news channel CNN+, presented awards and gave a short speech praising the "talent, effort and generosity" of prize-winners.
