= Jacobus Josephus Eeckhout =

Flemish painter, sculptor, pastellist, water-colourist and lithographer

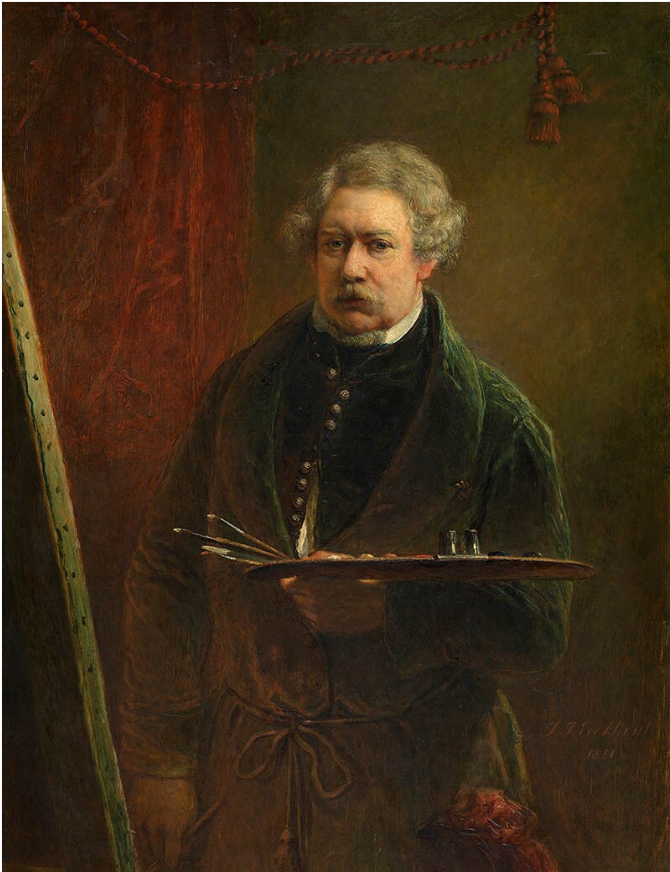
- Self-portrait, 1851
- Born: 6 or 8 February 1793, Antwerp
- Died: 25 December 1861, Paris
- Education: Royal Academy of Fine Arts (Antwerp)
- Known for: Painting, sculpture, water-colour, pastel and lithography

Jacobus Josephus Eeckhout or Jacques Joseph Eeckhout (6 or 8 February 1793 – 25 December 1861) was a Flemish painter, sculptor, pastellist, water-colourist and lithographer and a Director of the Royal Academy of Art in The Hague.

== Life and career ==
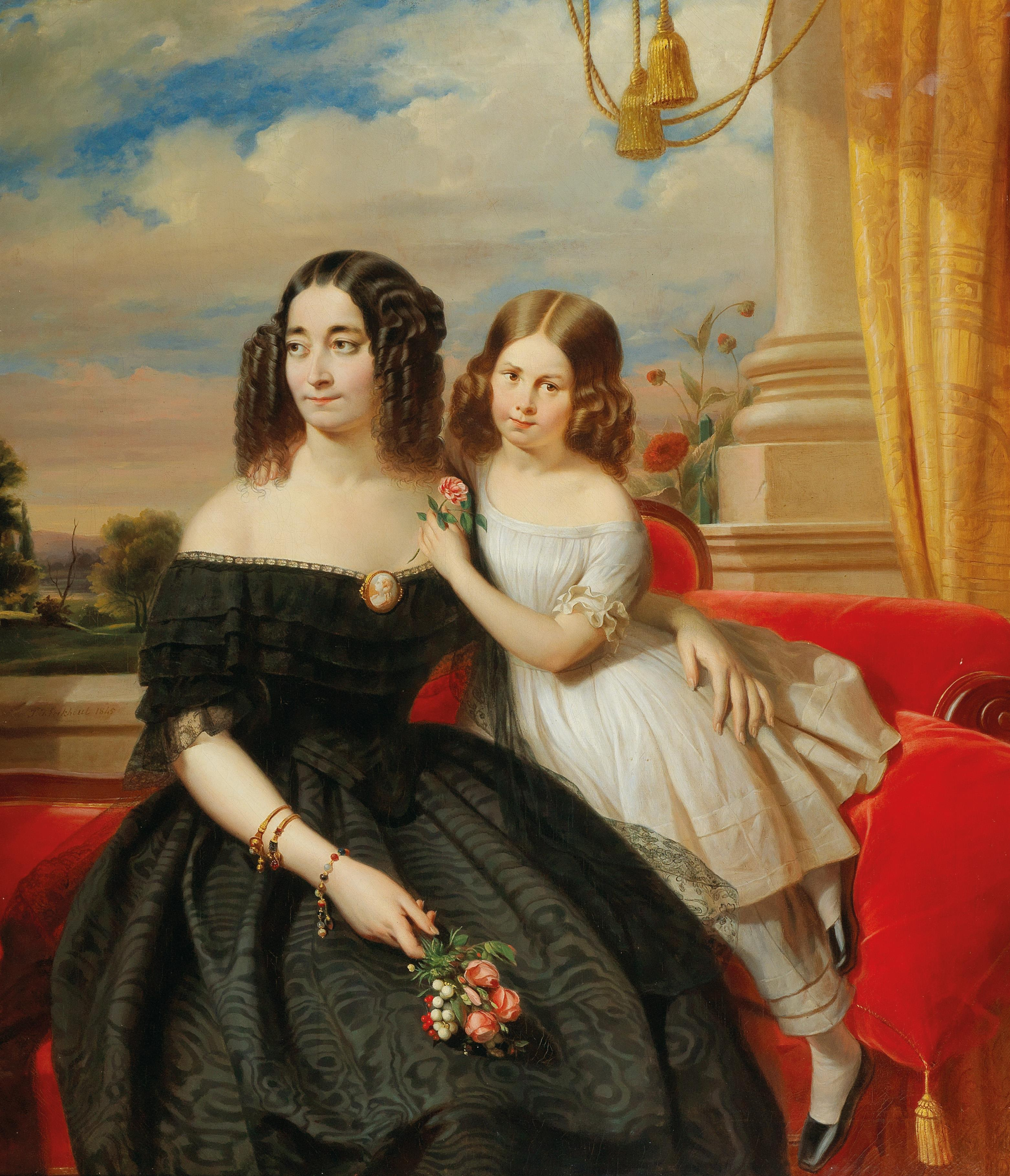
Madame Chesnaye and her Daughter

Eeckhout's birth details are unclear. He was born in Antwerp on either 6 or 8 February 1793. He received his initial art education at the Academy of Antwerp. At the Brussels Salon of 1821 he won first prize for sculpture.

In 1829 he was elected a member of the Academies of Amsterdam, Antwerp, Brussels, and Rotterdam. In 1830 he was elected a fourth class member of the Royal Institute of the Netherlands, of which he became a supernumerary associate in 1841. He settled in The Hague in 1831. In 1839 he was appointed director of the Royal Academy of Art of The Hague. He moved to Mechelen where he was recorded in 1844 and later to Brussels. He went to live in Paris in 1859. Here he became a banker which gave him less time to spend on his art. In Paris he was living on the boulevard des Italiens.

Eeckhout died in Paris on 25 December 1861.

Eeckhout had many students, including his son Victor Eeckhout who was an Orientalist painter. Other pupils were Willem Archibald Bake, Pieter Gerardus Bernhard, Johannes Mattheus Bogman, Louis Antoine Carolus, François De Marneffe, Gijsbertus Arnoldus Gretser, Henri Jean Baptiste Jolly, Willem Hendrik Pauli, Henri Rochussen and Frederik Pieter Thomas Somerschoe.

== Work ==
He painted historical and genre subjects, and portraits. His style and themes went back to the Dutch school of the 17th century painters such as Gerrit Dou and Frans van Mieris. The detailed small-scale works of these Dutch masters were held in high regard by 19th century collectors. His compositions are expressive and lively, and the colouring vigorous.

He published in 1822 in Brussels a collection of portraits of contemporary artists born in the Netherlands. He published in 1827 also in Brussels a history of the costumes of the people from all provinces of the Netherlands.

== Selected works ==
- The Death of William the Silent.
- Peter the Great at Zaandam.
- The Departure of the Recruits of Scheveningen.
- Collection de Portraits d'Artistes modernes, nés dans le royaume des Pays-Bas. 1822.
