= Josep Oliu =

Josep Oliu i Creus
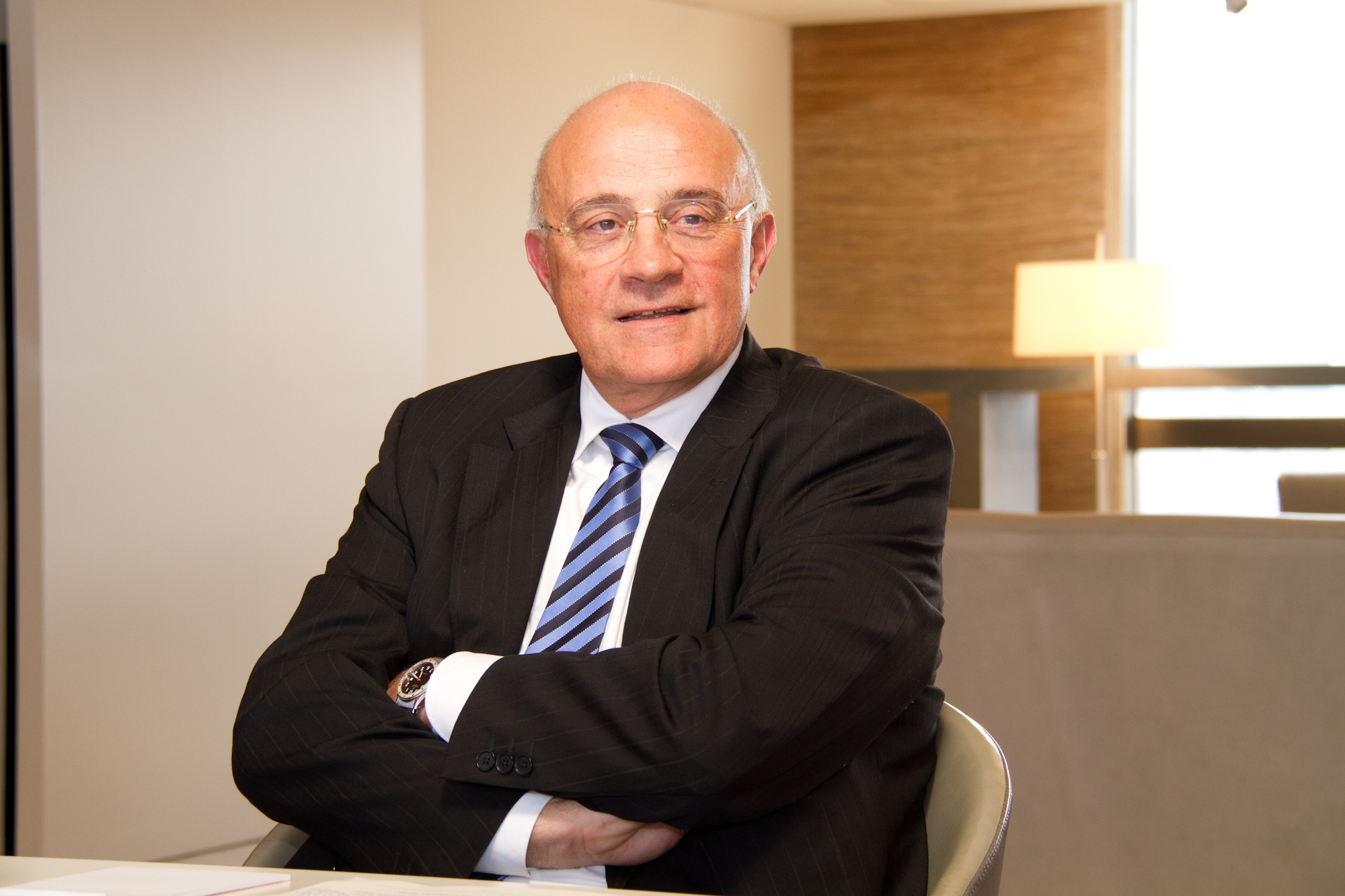
- Portrait of Josep Oliu in 2012
- Born: Josep Oliu i Creus; 1949 (age 76–77); Sabadell, Spain
- Occupation: Banker
- Known for: Chairman of Banco Sabadell since 1999

Josep Oliu i Creus, (Sabadell, 1949) is a Spanish economist and business executive known for his long tenure as chairman of Banc Sabadell, since 1999.

== Early life ==
Son of Joan Oliu i Pich, also a prominent businessman, Josep Oliu has played a prominent role in the economic and business landscape of Catalonia. His career has included contributions to the development of the region's economy and society, as well as efforts to strengthen Banco Sabadell's position as a major financial institution in Spain.

He obtained a degree in economics from the University of Barcelona and a PhD in economics from the University of Minnesota.

== Career ==
His professional career includes work at the Bank of Spain and leadership at the Instituto Nacional de Industria (INI), before joining Banco Sabadell in 1986. He became chairman of Banc Sabadell in 1999, a position he held through 2025, playing a central role in the bank's expansion and strategic development over several decades.

During his time at Banc Sabadell, Oliu oversaw significant transformations, including its expansion through acquisitions of several smaller banks during the early 2000s, the bank's response to the 2008 financial crisis, and a growing international presence.

In 2025, he was involved in the decision to relocate the bank's headquarters back to Catalonia, following a previous move to Alicante during the political uncertainty of 2017. He also played a prominent role in corporate governance during the attempted acquisition of Banco Sabadell by BBVA.

In addition to his role at Banc Sabadell, Oliu has been active in other business and institutional areas. He was appointed president of the Fundación Banco Sabadell in 2024, supporting initiatives in culture, science, and youth development. He has also served as board member of Puig; as a non executive president of Exea Empresarial, among other positions. His other roles have included membership in several nonprofit and advisory boards, such as the Princess of Girona Foundation, the Princess of Asturias Foundation, and the Fundación de Estudios de Economía Aplicada (FEDEA).
