= Experimentalist approach to econometrics =

The experimentalist approach to econometrics is a way of doing econometrics that, according to Angrist and Krueger (1999): … puts front and center the problem of identifying causal effects from specific events or situations. These events or situations are thought of as natural experiments that generate exogenous variations in variables that would otherwise be endogenous in the behavioral relationship of interest. An example from the economic study of education can be used to illustrate the approach. Here we might be interested in the effect of effect of an additional year of education (say X) on earnings (say Y). Those working with an experimentalist approach to econometrics would argue that such a question is problematic to answer because, and this is using their terminology, education is not randomly assigned. That is those with different education levels would tend to also have different levels of other variables. And these other variable, many of which would be unobserved (such as innate ability), also affect earnings. This renders the causal effect of extra years of schooling difficult to identify. The experimentalist approach looks for an instrumental variable that is correlated with X but uncorrelated with the unobservables.

== See also ==
- Instrumental variables
- Difference in differences
