= Victor Eeckhout =

Belgian painter (1821–1879)

- Born: 1821; Antwerp
- Died: 1879 (aged 57–58); Tangiers, Morocco
- Education: Jacob Joseph Eeckhout (father)
- Known for: Painter
- Movement: Orientalist

Victor Eeckhout (1821–1879) was a Belgian painter, noted for his genre works and paintings with Orientalist subject matter.

== Life and career ==
The son of painter, Jacob Joseph Eeckhout, Victor was born at Antwerp in 1821. He received his early art education from his father.

He travelled to the East, a major source of inspiration for many of his artworks. He was enamoured of Morocco and found it much more interesting and with more characters than Algiers. In Morocco, he met up with the artist, Jean Portaels and the pair spent time drinking mint tea and discussing art.

He died in 1879 in Tangiers.

== Work ==
Select List of Paintings

- The Entrance to the Souk, Tangiers, 1869
- Ruins at Tangiers,

Gallery

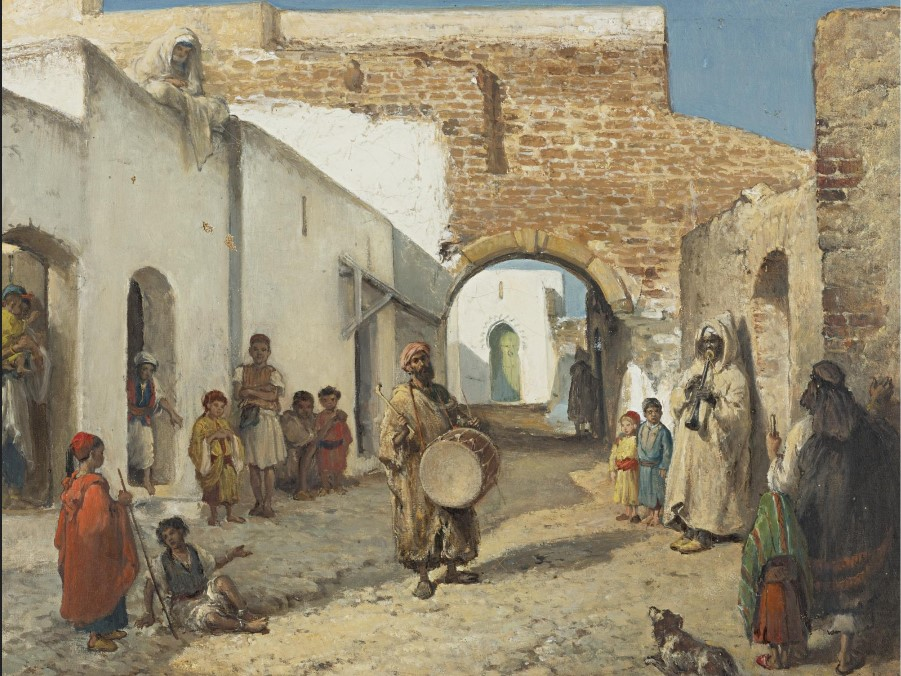
The Musicians of Tangiers, 1856–1879

Wedding Procession in Fez, 1856–1879

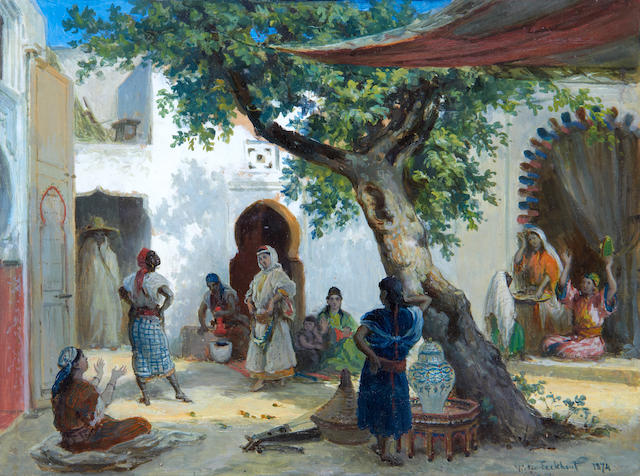
Dancers in the Courtyard, 1874

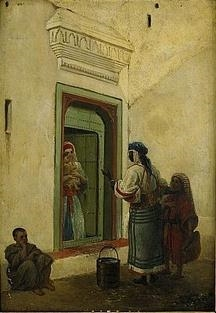
Conversation at Tangiers

== See also ==
- List of Orientalist artists
- Orientalism
