= Jan Eeckhout =

Belgian economist and academic

Jan Eeckhout MAE
- Born: Belgium
- Known for: Research on market power; Matching theory and sorting; Urban economics (Gibrat’s law)

Academic background
- Education: KU Leuven (BEng, 1992); University of Manchester (MA, 1993); London School of Economics (PhD, 1998)

Academic work
- Institutions: Universitat Pompeu Fabra; Barcelona School of Economics
- Awards: Fellow of the Econometric Society; Member of the Academia Europaea; King Jaume I Award
- Website: Information at IDEAS / RePEc

Jan Eeckhout MAE is a Belgian economist. He is an ICREA Research Professor at Pompeu Fabra University (UPF) and at the Barcelona School of Economics. Eeckhout is known for his research on the macroeconomic implications of market power, as well as his contributions to the economics of labor markets. He served as President of the European Economic Association in 2024 and is a Fellow of the Econometric Society and a Member of the Academia Europaea.

== Education ==
Eeckhout obtained a degree in Engineering and Economics from KU Leuven in 1992 and a Master of Arts in Economics from the University of Manchester in 1993. He earned his PhD in Economics from the London School of Economics (LSE) in 1998.

== Career ==
Eeckhout began his academic career as a Lecturer in Economics at the London School of Economics in 1996–1997. He joined the Department of Economics at Pompeu Fabra University (UPF) in 1997 and held a Marie Curie Fellowship there in 1998–1999.

From 2000 to 2010 he was on the faculty of the University of Pennsylvania, where he became Associate Professor with tenure and was voted Full Professor in 2010.

Between 2011 and 2019, Eeckhout was Professor of Economics at University College London. He returned to UPF as an ICREA Research Professor in 2008, a position he continues to hold, and since 2019 he has also been a research professor at the Barcelona School of Economics.

Eeckhout served as president of the European Economic Association in 2024 and is a member of the executive committee and council of the Econometric Society. He is also a research fellow at the Centre for Economic Policy Research, an associate researcher at the Centre de Recerca en Economia Internacional (CREI), and a research associate at the Institute for Fiscal Studies.

He is currently the founding editor of Review of Economic Studies: Insights. In the past, he has been editor of the International Economic Review and has served on the editorial boards of the Review of Economic Dynamics, the Journal of Economic Theory, and the Journal of the European Economic Association. He was chair of the European Research Council Consolidator Grant panel in 2024.

== Research ==
Eeckhout’s research lies at the intersection of macroeconomics, labor economics, and industrial organization, combining theoretical models with empirical analysis to examine market power, assortative matching, and urban economics. A central strand of his work documents the rise of market power in the global economy and its macroeconomic implications. In The Rise of Market Power and the Macroeconomic Implications (2020), co-authored with Jan De Loecker and Gabriel Unger, he uses firm-level data to show that aggregate markups in the United States have increased substantially since 1980, a development linked to declining labor shares of income, reduced labor market dynamism, and stagnant wages for low-skilled workers. These themes are synthesized for a broader audience in his book The Profit Paradox: How Thriving Firms Threaten the Future of Work (2021), which argues that highly productive firms adopt new technologies efficiently but use their market power to limit competition and exert monopsony power in labor markets, leading to higher consumer prices, lower wages, and increased economic inequality.

His research has also contributed to debates associated with the “New Brandeis” approach to antitrust policy. In labor economics, Eeckhout has made notable contributions to the study of matching and sorting, particularly assortative matching between workers and firms. In Identifying Sorting—In Theory (2011), co-authored with Philipp Kircher, he develops theoretical frameworks for identifying sorting patterns in frictional labor markets and for distinguishing among different forms of worker–firm complementarities. In urban economics, his work on city size distributions is widely cited. His 2004 article in the American Economic Review provides empirical support for Gibrat's law for cities, showing that city growth rates are independent of initial size and generate a log-normal distribution of city sizes across the entire urban system, rather than only in the upper tail described by Zipf's law.

== Awards and honors ==
- Kravis Award, University of Pennsylvania, 2002 and 2005
- Fellow of the European Economic Association, elected 2012
- Member of the Academia Europaea, elected 2014
- Fellow of the Econometric Society, elected 2019
- William G. Bowen Book Award, Princeton University, 2021
- ERC Advanced Grant, 2024
- King Jaume I Award, 2025

== Selected publications ==
- “Gibrat’s Law for (All) Cities,” American Economic Review, 2004.
- “Identifying Sorting—In Theory” (with P. Kircher), Review of Economic Studies, 2011.
- “Spatial Sorting” (with R. Pinheiro and K. Schmidheiny), Journal of Political Economy, 2014.
- “Global Market Power” (with J. De Loecker), National Bureau of Economic Research.
- “The Rise of Market Power and the Macroeconomic Implications” (with J. De Loecker and G. Unger), Quarterly Journal of Economics, 2020.
- The Profit Paradox: How Thriving Firms Threaten the Future of Work (Princeton University Press, 2021). Translated into Spanish, Italian, Chinese, Korean, Dutch, Catalan, Persian, and Japanese.
