= Laura Veldkamp =

American economist

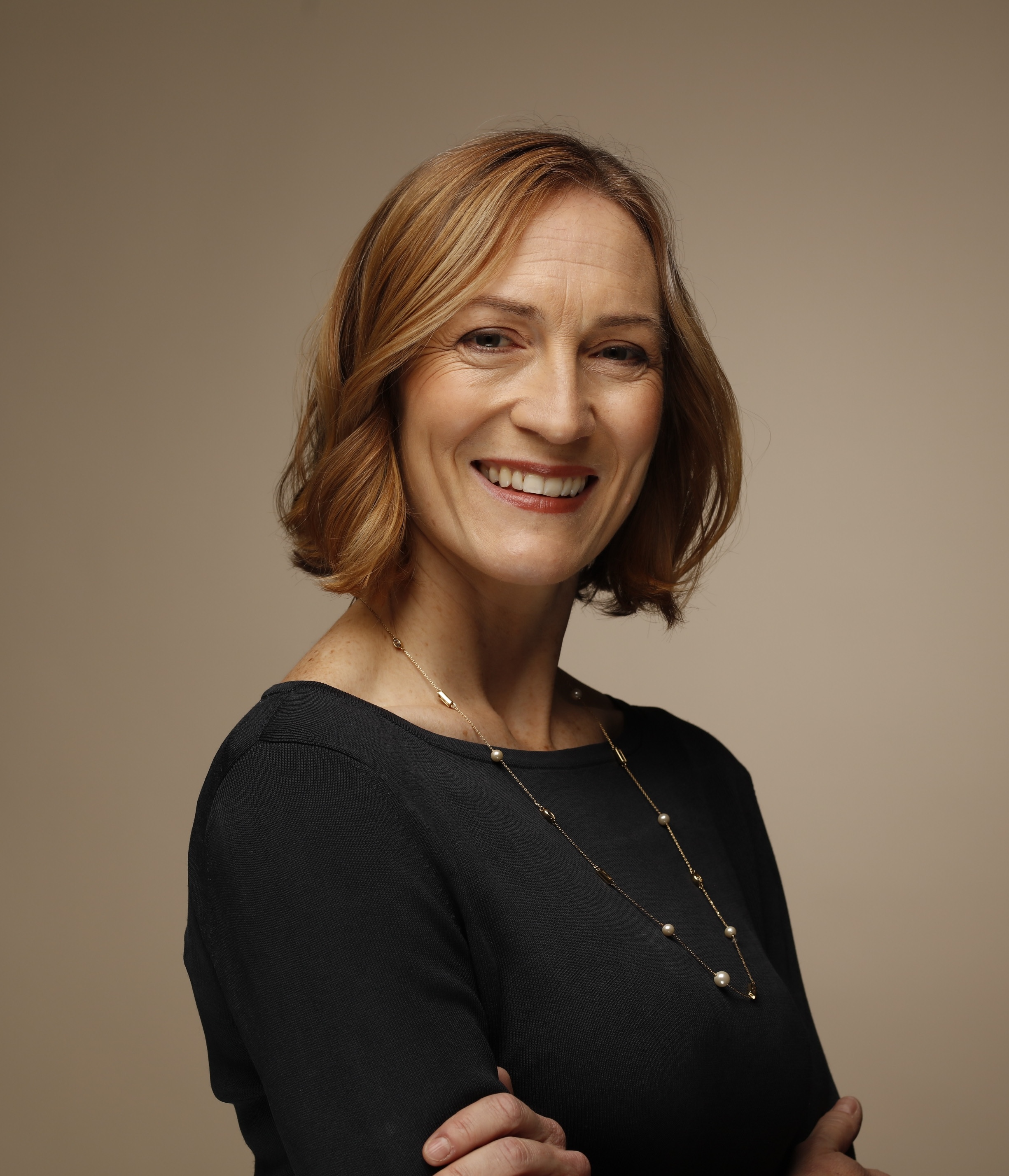

Academic background
- Education: Northwestern University (BA); Stanford University (PhD)

Academic work
- Discipline: Economics
- Institutions: New York University; Columbia University

Laura Veldkamp is an American economist teaching as a professor of finance at Columbia University's Graduate School of Business and also serves as an editorial advisor of the Journal of Economic Theory.

== Education ==
Veldkamp graduated with a Bachelor of Arts in Math and Economics from Northwestern University in 1996. She received her Ph.D. in Economic Analysis and Policy from the Stanford Graduate School of Business in 2001.

== Career ==
=== Early career ===
Veldkamp started her teaching career as an assistant professor of economics at INSEAD from 2001 to 2003. She then taught at New York University Stern School of Business as an assistant professor of economics from 2003 to 2008, before being promoted to an associate professor of economics. During her tenure at NYU, she was also a Kenen Fellow in the Department of Economics at Princeton University from 2006 to 2007 and a Hoover National Fellow at Stanford University from 2010 to 2011. In 2018, Veldkamp left New York University to join Columbia University's Graduate School of Business.

=== Current career ===
Veldkamp currently holds the Leon G. Cooperman Chair Professorship of Finance and Economics at Columbia University's Graduate School of Business. She is recognized as a fellow of the Finance Theory Group, the Econometric Society, and the Society for the Advancement of Economic Theory, the Cornell FinTech Initiative, the Center for Economic and Policy Research, and the National Bureau of Economic Research. She also chaired the program committee for the annual conference of the Society for Financial Studies in 2025.

Veldkamp serves on the American Economic Association’s awards committee, which nominates winners of the prestigious John Bates Clark medal. Additionally, she has been a board member and chair of the governance committee for the American Finance Association and was formerly a co-editor of the Journal of Economic Theory. Currently, she is also an economic advisor to both the New York Federal Reserve and the Bank for International Settlements.

== Books ==
Veldkamp co-authored The Data Economy: Tools and Applications with Isaac Baley, which was published by the Princeton University Press 2025. They develop tools to model and measure data economies, starting from the premise that data is digitized information which fuels AI and machine learning algorithms, used for prediction. Accurate predictions reduce uncertainty. The book examines how firms' use of data influences production, pricing, market power, advertising, asset pricing and business cycle dynamics. More information can be found here.

Veldkamp is the author of the textbook Information Choice in Macroeconomics and Finance, published by the Princeton University Press in 2011. The textbook highlights how information choice can be used to answer questions regarding "monetary economics, portfolio choice theory, business cycle theory, international finance, asset pricing, and other areas." It also covers how information friction can be used to build and test applied theory models, and includes recent research topics such as "rational inattention, information markets, and strategic games with heterogeneous information."

== Keynote Talks and Lectures ==
1. At the 2024 Asian Bureau of Finance and Economic Research (ABFER) conference, Veldkamp delivered a keynote titled Valuing Data as a New Asset Type. Her presentation explored innovative methods for assessing the economic value of data. A summary of the talk can be found here.
2. Veldkamp was invited to deliver the biannual Harris Lecture at Harvard University in 2024, where she discussed her research on competition and innovation within the data economy.
3. As part of NYU Stern's David K. Backus Memorial Lecture series, Veldkamp presented her research on Competition in a Data Economy. This lecture underscored her contributions to understanding data-driven market dynamics.
4. In her keynote at the 2023 National Bureau of Economic Research (NBER) conference, Veldkamp examined the role of data in long-term asset management, offering insights on how organizations can measure and leverage data as a strategic resource. The keynote can be viewed here.
5. Veldkamp delivered a keynote address at the 2022 European Finance Association (EFA) conference, where she presented her pioneering research on valuing data as an economic asset. The full talk is available to watch here.
6. In 2019, Veldkamp gave a plenary talk at the Society for Economic Dynamics conference, focusing on how data influences macroeconomic trends and financial markets. The talk can be viewed here.
7. Veldkamp participated in the 2018 Nobel Symposium discussion on "Money and Banking", where she shared her expertise on how data is reshaping finance and macroeconomics. The discussion can be watched here.

== Research ==
Veldkamp's research ranges from macroeconomics, monetary economics, international finance, and asset pricing. It examines how individuals, investors, and firms acquire and use information and data, and how these choices shape financial markets, macroeconomic outcomes, and firm behavior. Her work provides insights into the strategic value of information, the economics of data as an asset, and the broader impact of data-driven decision-making on economic growth and competition.

Veldkamp has published multiple works in outlets such as The American Economic Review, The Review of Economic Studies, The Journal of Finance, Journal of Economic Theory, and the Journal of Monetary Economics.

=== Early Research ===
Early award-winning papers included "Leadership, Coordination and Corporate Culture" with economists Patrick Bolton from Columbia University and Markus K. Brunnermeier from Princeton University, awarded the 2008 JP Morgan Prize and "Ratings Shopping and Asset Complexity: A Theory of Ratings Inflation" with Vasiliki Skreta, awarded 3rd place for the Glucksman Prize.

One of Veldkamp's best-known contributions is "Information Immobility and the Home Bias Puzzle" with Stijn Van Nieuwerburgh, which was awarded 1st place for the Glucksman Prize, best paper in investments by the Financial Management Association, and has received more than 1000 citations. While the paper was motivated by a puzzle about the lack of foreign investment, its enduring contribution is a solution to an information choice problem. Previous work had cracked the problem of whether or not an investor should acquire a given piece of information, while this work showed how to choose what one should learn about. It was a stepping stone for later work on data acquisition and the data economy.

=== Recent Research ===
Veldkamp's recent research agenda centers on the economics of data and its implications for markets, firms, and economic growth. Her work examines data as a strategic asset, a predictive tool, and a key input for AI algorithms.

"A Model of the Data Economy" with Maryam Farboodi develops a framework in which transactions generate data that is stored, traded, and depreciates, providing insights into why digital services are often free and how data influences GDP measurement. In collaboration with Jan Eeckhout, "Data and Markups: A Macro-Finance Perspective" investigates how firms' expanding data stocks affect markups without necessarily altering market power, introducing new methods to assess data's economic impact. "Valuing Financial Data," with Maryam Farboodi, Dhruv Singal, and Venky Venkateswaran, develops a sufficient statistics approach to valuing financial data using equilibrium asset return moments, showing that different investors can value the same data in markedly different ways. Her paper "Big Data in Finance and the Growth of Large Firms," with Juliane Begenau and Maryam Farboodi, demonstrates how big data analytics have lowered the cost of capital for large firms relative to smaller ones. Large established companies benefit disproportionately from data processing capabilities because they generate more data for investors to analyze, reducing uncertainty and financing costs. Collectively, these papers develop tools to measure the value of data as an asset, analyze its role in a growing economy, and understand how data affects market competition.
