= Journal of Applied Econometrics =

Academic journal on econometrics

- Discipline: Econometrics
- Language: English
- Edited by: Barbara Rossi

Publication details
- History: 1986–present
- Publisher: John Wiley & Sons
- Frequency: 7/year
- Impact factor: 2.424 (2020)

Standard abbreviations
- ISO 4: J. Appl. Econom.
- MathSciNet: J. Appl. Econometrics

Indexing
- ISSN: 0883-7252 (print); 1099-1255 (web)
- OCLC no.: 473990686

Links
- Journal homepage; Online access; Online archive

The Journal of Applied Econometrics is a peer-reviewed academic journal covering econometrics, published by John Wiley & Sons. It focuses on applications rather than theoretical issues. It was established in 1986 and is published seven times per year. Its editor-in-chief is Barbara Rossi. Since 1994 it has required its authors to deposit a complete set of data (provided they are non-confidential) into the journal's Data Archive, in order to enable the replication of empirical results published in the journal.
