= Barbara Rossi (economist) =

Italian economist

Academic background
- Education: Princeton University (PhD., Economics)
- Doctoral advisor: Mark Watson
- Website: www.barbararossi.eu

Barbara Rossi is an ICREA professor of economics at Universitat Pompeu Fabra, a Barcelona School of Economics Research Professor, a CREI affiliated professor and a CEPR Fellow. She is a founding fellow of the International Association of Applied Econometrics, a fellow of the Econometric Society and a director of the International Association of Applied Econometrics.

== Academic career ==
Rossi graduated with a B.A in economics from Bologna University in 1995, and she earned her PhD from Princeton University in 2001. Her graduate dissertation was titled, "Essays in Long Horizon Testing and Predictive Ability in the Presence of High Persistence with Applications to International Macroeconomics." Before moving to Universitat Pompeu Fabra, in Barcelona, she previously was an associate professor with tenure at the department of economics at Duke University. She has also been visiting researcher at the University of California, Berkeley, the University of Montreal in Canada, UC San Diego, the Federal Reserve Banks of Atlanta, New York and Philadelphia, Norges Bank, Bank of France, and ENSAE-CREST in France.

Aside from teaching, Professor Rossi is the editor of the Journal of Applied Econometrics and has previously served as associate editor of Quantitative Economics. In January 2017 she has been appointed vice chair of the Euro Area Business Cycle Network (EABCN) and subsequently appointed chair in January 2020. From 2017 to 2020, she was a member of the Council of the European Economic Association; she was a member of the European Standing Committee of the Econometric Society from 2015 to 2018; and has been a member of the EC^{2} standing committee since 2014. She was made a Fellow of the Royal Economic Society in May 2025. She has given keynote speeches at the 2019 SNDE Conference in Dallas (U.S.); the 2019 EC^{2} Conference in Oxford (U.K.), the XXIII Latin American and Caribbean Economic Association (LACEA) and Latin American Meeting of the Econometric Society (LAMES) in Guayaquil (Ecuador), the 2017 Midwest Econometrics Group Conference in Texas (U.S.), the Fourth International Symposium in Computational Economics and Finance in Paris (France); and the 2015 International Sympsium on Forecasting in Riverside (U.S.), the 2013 Italian Conference on Econometrics and Empirical Economics in Genova (Italy) and the 2012 Econometric Society Australasian Meetings in Melbourne (Australia), among others.

== Research contributions ==
Rossi specializes in the fields of time series econometrics, as well as applied international finance and macroeconomics.

Rossi's contributions to forecasting include having designed a variety of econometric procedures to evaluate forecasts especially in the presence of instabilities, including techniques to compare competing models' forecasts and to evaluate the predictive ability of a given model, Granger-causality tests robust to instabilities, techniques to detect forecast breakdowns, forecast evaluation techniques that are robust to the choice of the estimation window size, as well as several empirical works that investigate output and inflation predictability. In macroeconometrics, among other contributions, Rossi has designed techniques to study business cycles as well as the effects of monetary and fiscal policies. Rossi's research in the area of international finance encompasses several studies on the predictability of exchange rates—in particular the robustness of such forecasts to instabilities—and on the relationship between exchange rates and oil prices.

== Books ==
Rossi wrote a chapter on "Advances in Forecasting under Model Instabilities" for the Handbook of Economic Forecasting (Elsevier-North Holland eds.), a chapter on "Forecasting in Macroeconomics" for the Handbook of Research Methods and Applications in Empirical Macroeconomics, and an article for the Journal of Economic Literature on exchange rate predictability.

== Rossi's Research Funding ==
Rossi has been awarded two National Science Foundation grants as well a Marie Curie fellowship, two ERC grants, and several grants from the Spanish Ministry of Research.

== Other activities ==
Along with her teaching and research responsibilities, Rossi holds various other professional positions. She currently serves as the editor of the Journal of Applied Econometrics was a co-editor of the International Journal of Central Banking, and has served as associate editor for the Journal of Business and Economic Statistics, Quantitative Economics and the Journal of Economic Dynamics and Control. She was a member of the CEPR business cycle dating committee from 2012 to 2018. She was the Program Chair for the 2016 Econometric Society European Summer Meetings and the 2014 International Association of Applied Econometrics Conference.
