= Structural estimation =

In econometrics, structural estimation is a technique for estimating deep "structural" parameters of theoretical economic models. The term is inherited from the simultaneous equations model, also used in other fields. Structural estimation is extensively using the equations from the economics theory, and in this sense is contrasted with "reduced form estimation" and other nonstructural estimations that study the statistical relationships between the observed variables while utilizing the economics theory very lightly (mostly to distinguish between the exogenous and endogenous variables, so called "descriptive models"). The idea of combining statistical and economic models dates to mid-20th century and work of the Cowles Commission.

The difference between a structural parameter and a reduced-form parameter was formalized in the work of the Cowles Foundation. A structural parameter is also said to be "policy invariant" whereas the value of reduced-form parameter can depend on exogenously determined parameters set by public policy makers. The distinction between structural and reduced-form estimation within "microeconometrics" is related to the Lucas critique of reduced-form macroeconomic policy predictions.

== Structured and reduced form models ==
When the Cowles Commission introduced the term "reduced form" it was used to define a set of equations where the "left-hand" dependent variables never appeared on the right-hand of the equations, as opposed to the simultaneous equations, where the dependent variable of an equation can appear as an input in other formulas.

The original distinction between structure and reduced-form was between the underlying system and the direct relationship between observables implied by the system.

Different combinations of structural parameters can imply the same reduced-form parameters, so structural estimation must go beyond the direct relationship between variables.

Many economists now use the term "reduced form" to mean statistical estimation without reference to a specific economic model. For example, a regression is often called a reduced-form equation even when no standard economic model would generate it as the reduced form relationship between variables.

These conflicting distinctions between structural and reduced form estimation arose from the increasing complexity of economic theory since the formalization of simultaneous equations estimation. A structural model often involves sequential decision-making under uncertainty or strategic environments where beliefs about other agents' actions matter. Parameters of such models are estimated not with regression analysis but non-linear techniques such as generalized method of moments, maximum likelihood, and indirect inference. The reduced-form of such models may result in a regression relationship but often only for special or trivial cases of the structural parameters.

== See also ==
- Methodology of econometrics
