= Kiel Institute for the World Economy =

German economic research institute and think tank

- Kiel Institut für Weltwirtschaft
- Type: Non-profit
- Established: 1914
- Founder: Bernhard Harms
- Affiliations: Leibniz Association
- President: Moritz Schularick
- Total staff: approx. 160
- Location: Kiel, Schleswig-Holstein, Germany
- Website: www.kielinstitut.de

Former logo

The Kiel Institute for the World Economy (German: Kiel Institut für Weltwirtschaft) is an independent, non-profit economic research institute and think tank based in Kiel, Germany. In 2017, it was ranked as one of the top 50 most influential think tanks in the world and was also ranked in the top 15 in the world for economic policy specifically. The German business newspaper Handelsblatt referred to the institute as "Germany's most influential economic think tank", while Die Welt stated that "The best economists in the world are in Kiel" (Die besten Volkswirte der Welt sitzen in Kiel).

Founded in 1914, the institute is the oldest economic research institute in Germany. Its main areas of specialities include global economic research, economic policy, and economic education. The institute gave rise to the world's largest specialist library of economics and the social sciences, the German National Library of Economics, which has access to more than four million publications in printed or electronic format and subscriptions to over 30,000 periodicals and journals. It is also a member of the Gottfried Wilhelm Leibniz Scientific Community, or Leibniz Association, an association of research institutions, museums, and centers that includes Germany's six leading economic research institutes. The institute employs approximately 160 people, of whom more than 80 are economists. The current president of the institute is Moritz Schularick, a German economist who specializes in macrofinance, banking and financial stability, international finance, political economy, and economic history.

== History ==
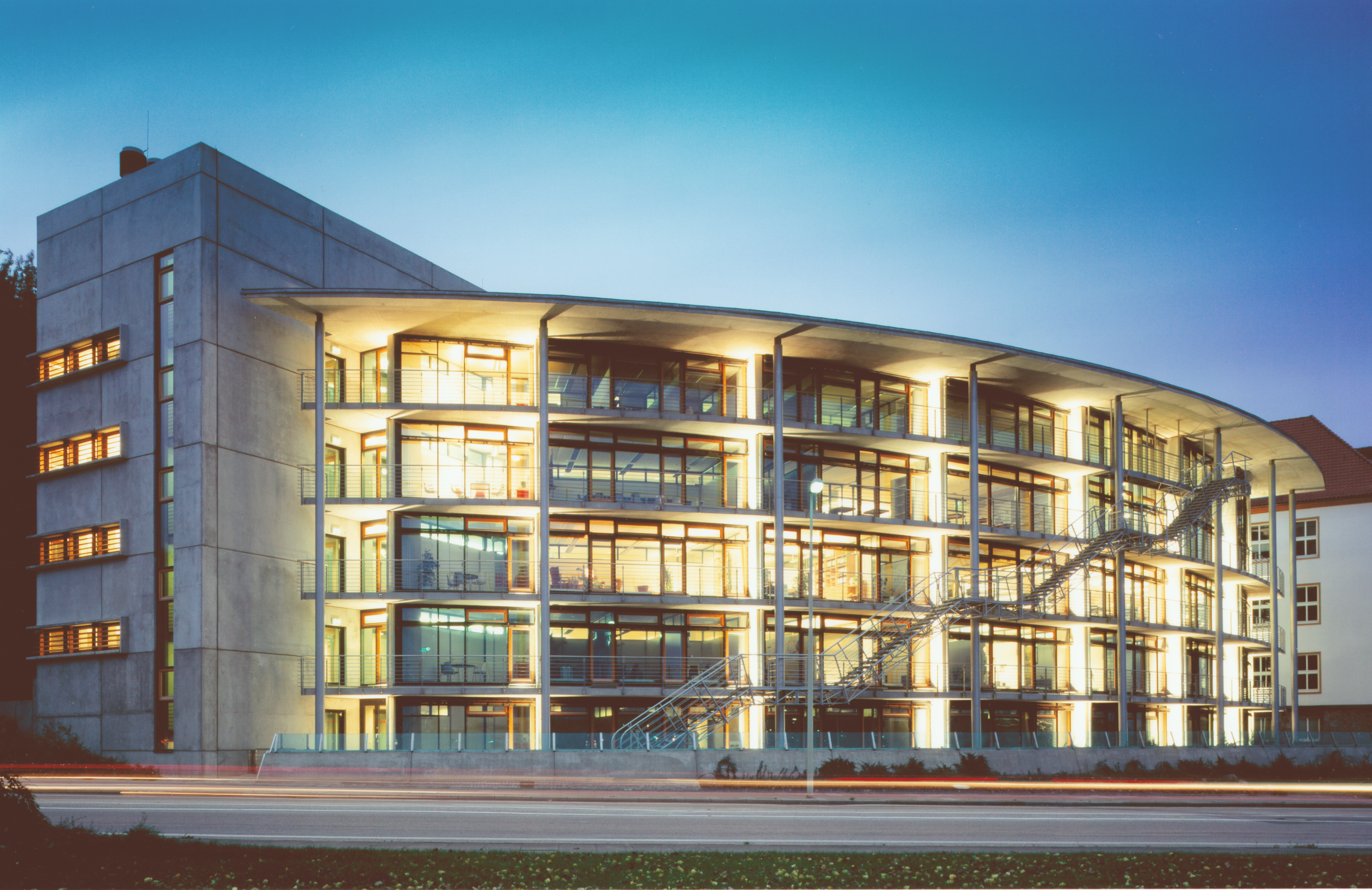
The Zentralbibliothek Wirtschaft is closely associated with the institute.

=== Founding ===
The institute was founded under the name of Königliches Institut für Seeverkehr und Weltwirtschaft an der Christian-Albrechts-Universität zu Kiel (lit. 'Royal Institute for Maritime Transport and World Economics at Kiel University') on 18 February 1914, and opened two days later at the address Schlossgarten 14. With the help of its Sponsors' Association, it was to acquire new premises in 1919, a hotel called the Seebadeanstalt, which was owned by the Krupp family, a prominent family in manufacturing and steelmaking industry. The institute moved to its new premises in the spring of 1920, where it changed its name to the current German one in 1934.

Its original mission, as part of Kiel University, was to study the world economy. It was one of the first institutions to adopt a research agenda focused on international economics, while most other economic institutes focused heavily on national economies. The institute sought to understand global economic flows and trends through consulting the German government on economic policy recommendations and developing an international network of experts. The founding director and first head of the Kiel Institute, Bernhard Harms, directed the establishment of a research library, which was systematically expanded by Wilhelm Gülich, the head of the library for a number of years as of 1924, into the world's largest economics library. Harms also established several journals and an economics-related press archive. Further, he attached great importance to linking research to practical economics and to teaching research findings to economics students.

=== World War I and World War II ===
The institute at the time conducted international research for the benefit of Germany, which led to the establishment of a war archive and to the expansion of the institute during World War I. During the Weimar Republic, the institute established a reputation for competence in international economics. In 1926, the institute established a department for statistical economics and business-cycle research, which gave the institute a new profile in business cycle theory and business cycle policies. The new department was headed by Adolph Lowe and staffed by such researchers as Gerhard Colm, Hans Neisser, Jacob Marschak, and Wassily Leontief, all of whom published highly acclaimed research findings.

When the Nazi Party seized power in Germany, Jewish members of staff and members of staff who were active in the Social Democratic Party were quickly forced to leave the institute. This affected the new department for statistical economics and business cycle research the most, and many of the staff in the department emigrated to the United States, where they became professors of economics. Bernhard Harms initially supported the Nazis and remained the head of the institute, but later resisted the Sturmabteilung (SA) when it forced the Jewish members of staff to leave the institute, and was himself then forced to leave. Formally, he retained his professorship at Kiel University, but was actually only active academically as an honorary professor in Berlin until his death in 1939. Harms was succeeded by Jens Jessen, who, because of differences with the Nazis, had himself transferred to the University of Marburg in October 1934. He was succeeded by Andreas Predöhl, who had worked for a long time under Bernhard Harms. Predöhl served as director of the institute from July 1934 to November 1945. He strengthened the ties between the institute and Kiel University and prevented the institute's library from being cleansed of books written by Jews. During his term in office, the library was also able to buy foreign literature until far into World War II.

Throughout the war, the institute continued to conduct international economic research that was important for Germany's war planning and its economic aspects, for example, access to natural resources and the geopolitical significance of areas that Germany considered to be part of its "Grossraum" (economic areas under German supremacy), up until 1945. A comprehensive analysis of the research conducted by the institute between 1933 and 1945 has never been undertaken. The complete holdings of the library were moved to Ratzeburg (Herzogtum Lauenburg) and thus were not destroyed during the war. However, parts of the institute and its press archive were destroyed. After the war, British occupation authorities dismissed Predöhl as the director of the institute (in November 1945) but allowed him to remain a professor at Kiel University, which he left for a professorship at the University of Münster in 1953. He died at the age of 80 in Münster in 1974.

=== Postwar period ===
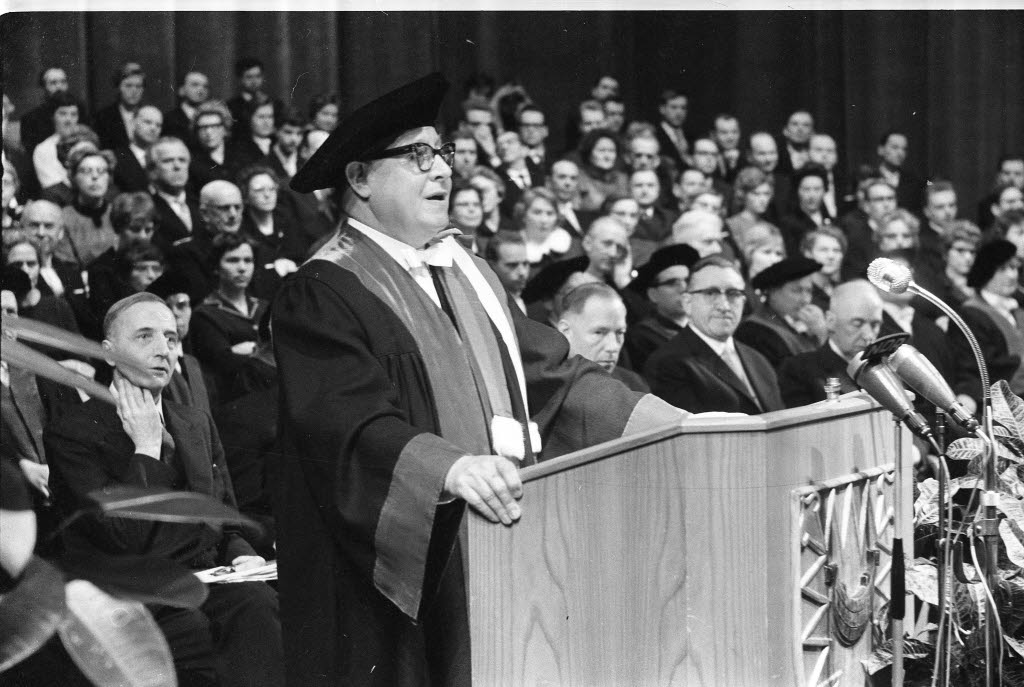
President Erich Schneider at the 50th anniversary of the institute

It was in the postwar period that the institute began to dominate "the German economic landscape". Friedrich Hoffmann was temporarily appointed to replace Predöhl as the acting director of the institute and was succeeded, in 1948, by Fritz Baade (1893–1974), who devoted himself primarily to research in agricultural economics and food security. Under his leadership and thanks to his good connections in the United States and other countries, he was able to reintegrate the institute into the international research community and to expand its role as an important economic research center with its own large library and its own archive of press clippings.

Erich Schneider (1900–1970) succeeded Fritz Baade as the director of the institute in 1961. As the leading proponent of Keynesianism in Germany at the time and the author of a multivolume bestseller entitled "Einführung in die Volkwirtschaftslehre" (Introduction to Economics), he affiliated the institute more closely with Kiel University, which resulted in many researchers at the institute becoming professors at German and non-German universities. He also established the Bernhard Harms Prize in 1964 upon the institute's 50th anniversary. The first person to be awarded the prize, Gerhard Colm, was a former researcher at the institute, a professor, an advisor to President Truman, and the engineer of the German currency reform in 1948. By the 1970s, the institute was recognized as "the most prestigious of the five main economic think tanks in Germany".

Herbert Giersch (1921–2010) was appointed director of the institute in 1969 and subsequently became president of the institute. Numerous macroeconomic changes and geopolitical, which determined the institute's research and policy-advising activities, took place during his period in office: the collapse of the Bretton Woods system, the rise in oil prices, and the increased manufacturing in developing countries and emerging markets. Giersch strengthened the institute's policy-advising role in Germany by playing a leading intellectual role in the German Council of Economic Experts. In this role, the institute became involved in numerous controversies with the German government because it differed with the government on such important issues as exchange rate policies and monetary, labor, and industrial policies. Under Giersch's leadership, the institute became significantly more active in research based on international collaboration. As a result, it played a leading role in the Sonderforschungsbereich 86 "Weltwirtschaft und internationale Wirtschaftsbeziehungen" (Special Research Area 86 for Global Economics and Global Economic Affairs).

=== Present day ===
Giersch was succeeded by Horst Siebert (1938–2009) in 1989. Numerous economic sea changes also took place during his period in office: communist economies collapsed, the two Germanys were reunited, China became a world economic power, information technology emerged, and reforms of the labor market and social security systems became topical, as did the sustainable use of environmental resources as well. During his period in office, he was, like Herbert Giersch before, a member of the German Council of Economic Experts. Further, he defined the institute's public image by often appearing on television and by publishing numerous articles and monographs on topical economic issues. Under his leadership, the institute became more involved in environmental and resource economics, and international financial market economics. Siebert served as the president of the institute until 2003, when he was given emeritus status.

After a period of 18 months in which the institute had difficulties appointing a new president, Dennis J. Snower (born 1950) succeeded Siebert. Snower was appointed president of the institute in October 2004 and is the first non-German to be appointed head of a leading economic research institute in Germany. He reorganized the institute from the ground up, redefined its mission, and established such events as the Global Economic Symposium and the Global Economy Prize Awards, both of which are symbolic of the institute's mission: to be a highly competent center for global economic affairs in research, education and policy-advising pertaining to topics and issues that are of immediate social importance from a global perspective, and to strike a balance between being a research center on its own and a part of various research networks.

As of January 2007, the institute's library officially became an independent nonprofit organization under German public law, and renamed itself the German National Library of Economics (ZBW). The ZBW is the world's largest research library for economic literature, providing scholars and researchers with documents through its Open Access portal, along with the ZBW-owned repositories EconStor and EconBiz. In 2014, the institute celebrated its 100-year anniversary.

== Events ==
=== Conferences and symposia ===
==== Global Economic Symposium ====
The institute co-hosts Germany's annual Global Economic Symposium, together with the German National Library of Economics. The Global Economic Symposium notably hosts the Global Solutions Summit, where politicians, NGOs, think tanks, and business leaders meet to discuss solutions to global challenges. The goal of the summit is to discuss solutions to urgent global problems and present a range of policy recommendations for international organizations. At the 2017 summit in Berlin, the institute presented a number of recommendations for the G-20 and G-7 concerning the digital economy, climate policy, international finance, and migration. The 2018 summit had many notable guests, including Chancellor Angela Merkel and Nobel Laureate Edmund Phelps. At the 2019 conference, Merkel was scheduled to speak alongside Heiko Maas (Federal Minister of Foreign Affairs), Peter Altmaier (Federal Minister of Economics and Energy), Katarina Barle (Federal Minister of Justice and Consumer Protection), Hubertus Heil (Federal Minister for Labor), Naoyuki Yoshino (dean of the Asian Development Bank Institute), and Pascal Lamy (former director-general of the World Trade Organization).

==== International Business Cycle Forum ====
Another conference is the Kieler Konjunkturgespräche (KKG) (International Business Cycle Forum). The bi-annual series of conferences alternates between Kiel (spring) and Berlin (autumn). The KKG runs the Forecasting Center, which presents forecasts and analyses on the German economy, the Euro area economy, and the world economy. The conference has run for the past 40 years.

=== Award ceremonies ===
==== Global Economy Prize ====
Along with the city of Kiel, the institute awards the Global Economy Prize, which is meant to honor new initiatives to deal with globalization. Since 2005, the award ceremony has been held annually at the Haus der Wirtschaft building of the Chamber of Commerce and Industry. It serves to inspire creative solutions to present-day economic challenges and to influence change in politics, business, and academia. Past recipients of the Global Economy Prize include Richard Thaler (University of Chicago), Edmund Phelps (Columbia University), Joseph Stiglitz (Columbia University), and Robert Shiller (Yale University).

==== Bernhard Harms Prize ====
Since 1964, the institute presents the biannually Bernhard Harms Prize, named for founder Bernhard Harms, which awards €25,000 to individuals "with a distinguished record in the field of international economics." Past winners include Carmen Reinhart (Harvard University), Abhijit Banerjee (Massachusetts Institute of Technology), and Gene Grossman (Princeton University). The award ceremony lectures are published in the institute's internationally renowned journal, Review of World Economics.

==== Excellence Award in Global Economic Affairs ====
Lastly, the institute awards the Excellence Award in Global Economic Affairs, which is granted to young researchers in the area of global economic affairs. Economists under the age of 35, or those who have received a PhD within the past seven years, are eligible to receive the award, which includes financial and administrative support for future research. Jury members select up to three Young Economists annually as Research Fellows.

=== Education ===
The institute is engaged in activities related to economic education, offering an Advanced Studies program, a summer school program, PhD courses, and support for junior researchers. The Advanced Studies Program (ASP) in International Economic Policy Research was founded in 1984 and brings together students and young professionals interested in collaborating on the evaluation of economic policies and obtain the necessary skills for rigorous economic analyses. The 10-month curriculum has an international dimension to it, focusing on international organizations and policies. The institute also offers one- and two-week Supplementary Courses for PhD candidates through the ASP.

In 2002, the institute founded the doctoral programme in quantitative economics in conjunction with the Institute of Statistics and Econometrics and with the department of economics at Kiel University. The program focuses on quantitative methods that fit within one or more research areas of the institute. The program maintains an admissions rate of approximately 5%. The institute also offers a number of postdoc and junior professorship positions. Many postdocs continue on to work for government organizations (the European Central Bank, Swiss National Bank, the German federal ministries), or take up positions in academia in Germany, the United Kingdom, and the United States.

Kiel Institute Summer School offers a series of lectures each year to leading researchers on topics of macroeconomics and finance. In 2018, the institute invited Stephen Hansen (University of Oxford), Theresa Kuchler (New York University), and Michele Modugno (Federal Reserve). In conjunction with its lectures, the institute hosts a number of seminars and workshops for scholars to collaborate on projects and share results findings. These events include the lunch-time Seminar in International Economics, the Behavioral Economics Seminar, and the Erich Schneider Seminar.

Lastly, the institute provides funding and support for project-related research.

== Research ==
=== Research areas ===
Each of the institute's research areas conducts original empirical research, publishes peer-reviewed articles, and provides policy recommendations through working papers. Each group also contributes to the institute's Economic Outlook Report and Review of World Economics. The groups often work together on projects when areas overlap, and all of the projects are global in scope and in analysis. The seven key research areas are:

- The Global Division of Labor group analyzes the effects of international trade, foreign direct investment, and international migration at the global level.
- The Knowledge Creation and Growth group evaluates the determinants of knowledge creation, diffusion, and knowledge-based growth in industrialized and emerging economies. Core research themes include the challenges of digitalization, innovation, and internationalization.
- The Social and Behavioral Approaches to Global Problems group focuses the impact of social interactions on the emergence of global economic problems.
- The Environment and Natural Resources group develops models and tools for understanding trade-offs between policy objectives, identify priorities for decision makers, and offer solutions for sustainable and inclusive prosperity in the globalized world.
- The Poverty Reduction, Equity, and Development group (PEGNet)addresses efforts of Sustainable Development Goals (SDGs) which aim to reduce absolute poverty, stress the importance of peace, and emphasize the need for cooperative sustainable development.
- The International Finance and Global Governance group explores the risks and opportunities of financial globalization by focusing on topics such as cross-border capital flows, sovereign debt, and economic crises.
- The Macroeconomic Policy under Market Imperfections group leads efforts to reduce unemployment, resolve inflationary pressures, and understand the key drivers for business cycle fluctuations.

=== Scholars ===
The institute brings together a number of scholars, professors, and policymakers from around Germany and the world. The following researchers have been affiliated with the institute.

Heads of the institute:

- Bernhard Harms (1914–1933)
- Jens Jessen (1933–February 1934)
- Andreas Predöhl (1934–1945)
- Fritz Baade (1948–1961)
- Erich Schneider (April 1961–December 1968)
- Herbert Giersch (1969–1989)
- Horst Siebert (1989–March 2003)
- Dennis Snower (October 2004–February 2019)
- Gabriel Felbermayr (March 2019–September 2021)
- Holger Görg (Interim President December 2021–May 2023)
- Moritz Schularick (June 2023–present)

Other notable researchers:

- Carmen Reinhart, Minos A. Zombanakis Professor of the International Financial System at Harvard Kennedy School
- Norbert Walter, chief economist of Deutsche Bank from 1990 to 2009
- Carl E. Walsh, distinguished professor of economics and chair of economics at the University of California, Santa Cruz
- Holger Görg, professor of international economics at the Kiel University
- Thomas Mirow, German politician of the Social Democratic Party and former president of the European Bank for Reconstruction and Development, 2008-2012
- Kai A. Konrad, former professor of economics at the Free University of Berlin and current director at the Max Planck Institute for Tax Law and Public Finance
- Marcel Fratzscher, German economist and professor at Humboldt University of Berlin
- Oskar Anderson, professor at the Commercial Institute of Varna and the University of Sofia, eventual chair at Kiel University
- Johannes Teyssen, CEO and chairman of E.ON, a German electric utility company
- Peter Kruse, professor of organizational psychology at the University of Bremen and pioneer in the field of collective intelligence
- Karl Schiller, German economist and former Federal Minister of Economic Affairs, 1966-1972
- Hermann Bente, German economist at the University of Königsberg
- Ewald Bosse, Norwegian economist and founder of "Arbeit" theory of a rational living labor force
- Gerhard Colm, German economist at the New School for Social Research and part of the first Council of Economic Advisors in the United States
- Wassily Leontief, Russian-American economist, most known for input-output analysis and Leontief production function
- August Lösch, German economist and founder of regional science
- Adolph Lowe, German sociologist and economist, specializing in behavioral economics
- Hans Neisser, German-American economist and pioneer of the field of econometrics
- Hermann Beckh, German anthropologist and lecturer at the Free University of Berlin

=== International reputation ===
The institute is consistently recognized as one of the premier institutions for economic research in Europe and in the world. The Lauder Institute at the University of Pennsylvania's annual ranking of think tanks placed No. 19 in Domestic Economics Think Tanks, No. 14 in International Economics Think Tanks, and No. 41 for Best Think Tanks in the world.

Consensus Economics, a UK-based survey organization, awarded the institute's Forecasting Center with the 2017 Forecast Accuracy Award. The institute, founded in 1914, has served as the model for other research organizations in Germany, such as the Deutsches Institut für Wirtschaftsforschung (DIW) and the Ifo Institut für Wirtschaftsforschung.

Research conducted by the institute has been featured in numerous publications, both in academic journals, such as the American Economic Review, the Journal of International Economics, Nature, European Economic Review, Journal of Health Economics, and in news outlets, such as Forbes, the Financial Times, Bloomberg, and the Wall Street Journal. The institute's publication serve stakeholders in both the public and private sectors, as well as those with an interest in domestic and international economic policy

Since 1913, the institute publishes has published its own peer-reviewed journal, the Review of World Economics (Weltwirtschaftliches Archiv). The journal has a 2017 impact factor of 1.31 and its 5-Years H index is 53.

=== Partnerships ===
The institute is affiliated with Kiel University where it cooperates closely with the department of business, Economics, and Social Sciences. It is nevertheless legally and academically independent of Kiel University. Since 1 January 2007, it has been an independent, non-profit organization (foundation under public law).

The Leibniz Association includes a group of six leading economic research institutes in Germany. Like all the institutions that are members of the Leibniz Association, it is funded 50% by the German federal government and 50% by the German states. All German institutes of economic research must undergo an evaluation by the Leibniz Association. The institute is the oldest of these six economic research institutes. In collaboration with the others, the institute publishes a joint report on the state of the German economy, the Gemeinschaftsdiagnose (Joint Economic Forecast). The other leading research institutes include:

- Deutsches Institut für Wirtschaftsforschung (DIW), in Berlin
- Ifo Institut für Wirtschaftsforschung, in Munich
- Halle Institute for Economic Research, in Halle (Saale)
- Rheinisch-Westfälisches Institut für Wirtschaftsforschung (RWI), in Essen
- Hamburgisches Welt-Wirtschafts-Archiv, in Hamburg

With the Deutsches Institut für Wirtschaftsforschung (DIW), the Kiel Institute leads the Think20 (T20), an initiative that provides research-based policy advice to the G-20. The aim of the T20 is to publish policy briefs, engage policymakers through task forces, and host a number of workshops and conferences.

The institute maintains an international research network of universities, research centers, think tanks, and foundations around the world. Because of this, the institute hosts a number of external (non-resident) researchers and experts to lead projects. Notable partners outside of Germany include KPMG, the Paris School of Economics, OECD, the African School of Economics, and the Institute for New Economic Thinking.
