= Bernhard Harms =

German economist

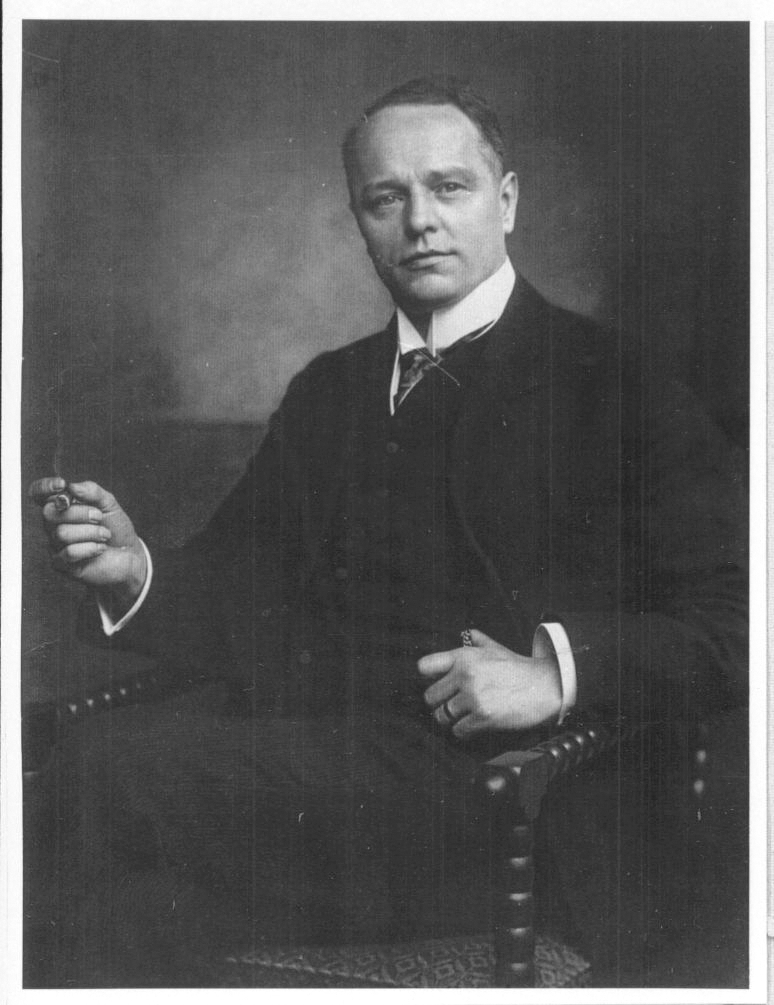
- Founder of the Kiel Institute for the World Economy
- Born: Christoph Bernhard Cornelius Harms; March 30, 1876; Detern, German Empire
- Died: September 21, 1939 (aged 63); Berlin, Germany
- Education: University of Leipzig (Diplom), University of Tübingen (PhD)
- Occupations: Founder of the Kiel Institute for the World Economy and Chair of Economics

Christoph Bernhard Cornelius Harms (30 March 1876 – 21 September 1939) was a German economist and one of the first professors to undertake research in the field of international economics. He founded the Kiel Institute for the World Economy, Germany's leading economic research institute, in 1914. Harms was Chair of Economics at the University of Kiel and head of the Institute until he was dismissed from office in 1933 by Nazi Party officials.

== Education ==
Christoph Bernhard Cornelius Harms was born in Detern, Ostfriesland, on 30 June 1876 to Menno F. Harms (1845–?) and Anna M. Ries (1844–1921). In 1887, he attended the Städtische Volksschule in Aurich, and later Gymnasium in Norden. From 1890 to 1893 he completed an apprenticeship (Ausbildung) as a bookbinder in Celle. Harms began a degree in political science at the University of Leipzig (1897), then began a PhD in Economics at University of Tübingen (1900). He completed his doctoral dissertation under Gustav von Schönberg, a founder of the theory of world economy. Two years later, he completed his habilitation.

Harms married in 1902 and had three children.

Harms began teaching as a professor at the University of Jena in 1906, then transferred to the University of Kiel in 1908 where he was Chair of Economics. There, he founded the Kiel Institute for the World Economy.

== Kiel Institute for the World Economy ==
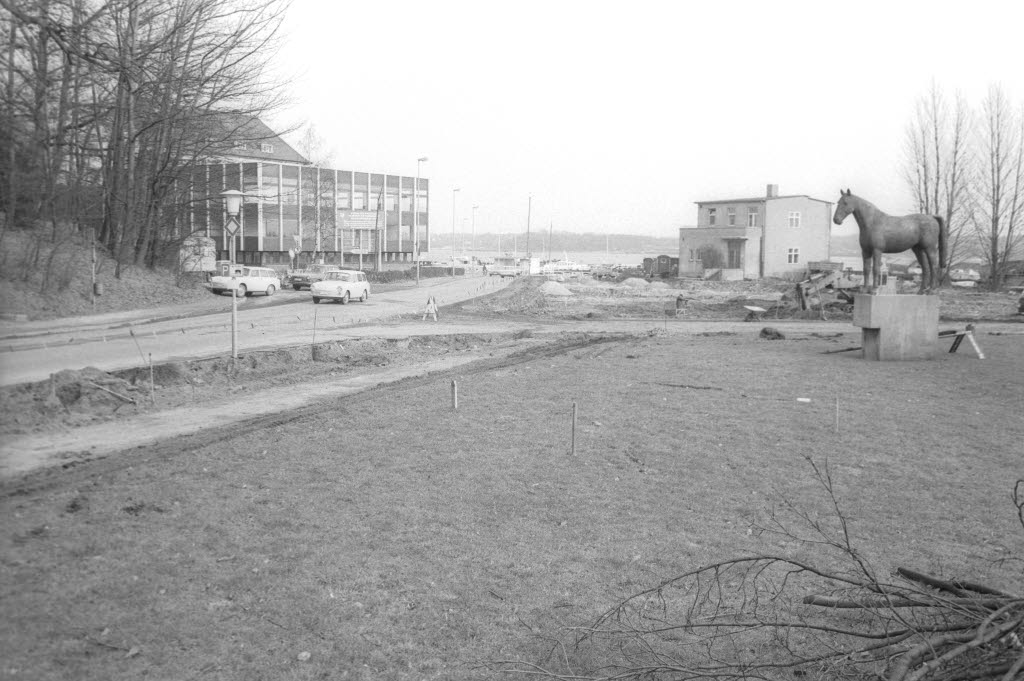
Construction of Bernhard-Harms-Weg, named in honor of the institute's founder (1971)

Founded on 18 February 1914, the Kiel Institute for the World Economy has been one of the leading economic research institutes in Germany. It began as the Königliches Institut für Seeverkehr and Weltwirtschaft an der Christian-Albrechts-Universität zu Kiel (Royal Institute for Maritime Transport and World Economics at the University of Kiel). Over the years, Harms worked to build the university's name, attracting well established economists such as Jacob Marschak, Wassily Leontief, Adolph Löwe, Gerhard Colm, and Hans Philipp Neisser. The original mission of the institute was to challenge the traditional scholar of nationally oriented political economy, and instead opting for a more international view on economic and political affairs.

== Expulsion and death ==
After the electoral victory of the Nazi Party in the March 1933 elections, Harms attempted to protect his Jewish colleagues from persecution. But on 25 April 1933, the Ministry of Culture enacted a new law, the Restoration of the Professional Civil Service. Harms was subsequently removed from the university and later from the institute. In 1933, Harms worked as an honorary professor in Berlin, then moved to the University of Marburg in 1934. He died in Berlin in 1939. His grave was placed in front of the original building of the Instituteon Düsternbrooker Weg in Kiel.

== Legacy ==
=== Bernhard Harms Prize ===
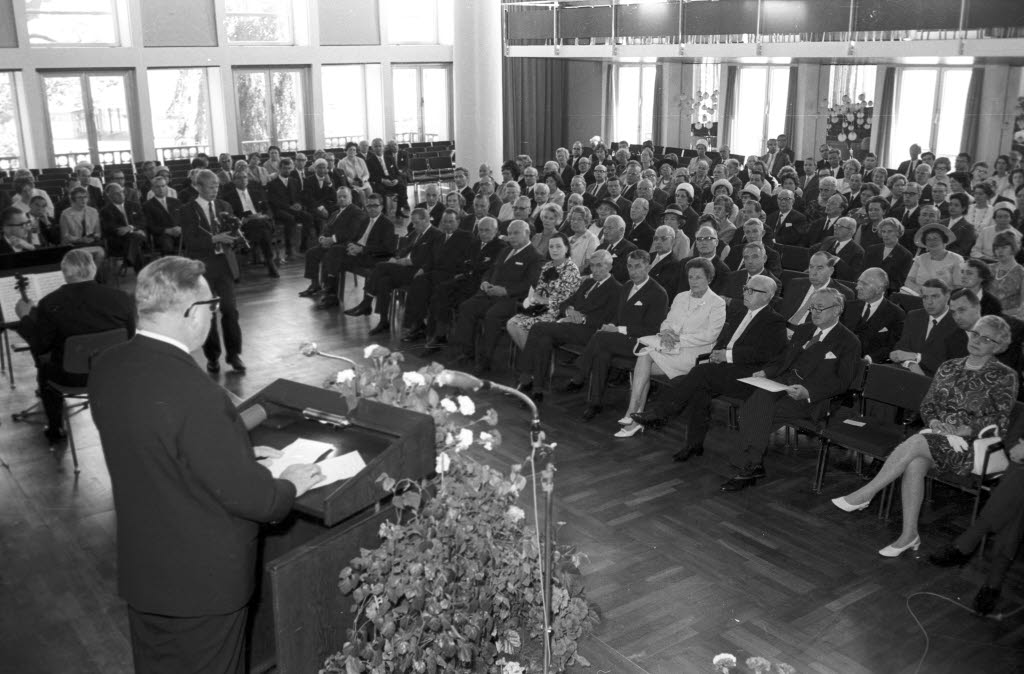
The 1968 award ceremony of the Bernard Harms Prize

Every two years since 1964, the Kiel Institute for the World Economy has awarded the Bernhard Harms Prize of €25,000 to individuals "with a distinguished record in the field of international economics." Award winners give presentations on their research at the Bernhard Harms Lectures at the institute, which are then published in the institute's journal, Review of World Economics / Weltwirtschaftliches Archiv.

| Year | Winner | Institution |
|---|---|---|
| 2018 | Carmen Reinhart | Harvard University |
| 2016 | Marc Melitz | Harvard University |
| 2014 | Abhijit Banerjee | Massachusetts Institute of Technology |
| 2012 | Gene Grossman | Princeton University |
| 2010 | Raghuram Rajan | University of Chicago |
| 2008 | Kenneth Rogoff | Harvard University |
| 2006 | Robert Feenstra | University of California |
| 2004 | Maurice Obstfeld | University of California |
| 2002 | Stanley Fischer | Massachusetts Institute of Technology |
| 2000 | Jeffrey D. Sachs | Harvard University |
| 1998 | Elhanan Helpman | Harvard University |
| 1996 | Assar Lindbeck | Institute for International Economic Studies |
| 1994 | Martin Feldstein | Harvard University |
| 1992 | Rudiger Dornbusch | Massachusetts Institute of Technology |
| 1990 | Anne O. Krueger | Duke University |
| 1988 | Jagdish Bhagwati | Columbia University |
| 1986 | W. Max Corden | Australian National University |
| 1984 | Bela Balassa | Johns Hopkins University |
| 1982 | William Fellner | Yale University |
| 1980 | Erik Lundberg | Stockholm School of Economics |
| 1978 | Charles P. Kindleberger | Massachusetts Institute of Technology |
| 1976 | Harry G. Johnson | University of Chicago |
| 1974 | Fritz Machlup | Princeton University |
| 1972 | Gottfried Haberler | Harvard University |
| 1970 | Wassily Leontief | Harvard University |
| 1968 | Hermann Josef Abs | Deutsche Bank |
| 1966 | Roy Harrod | Christ Church, Oxford |
| 1964 | Gerhard Colm | Washington, D.C. |

=== Bernhard Harms Medal ===
Since 1980, the Bernhard Harms Medal is awarded to individuals "who have contributed to the Kiel Institute's research on the world economy in the tradition of Bernhard Harms."

| Year | Winner | Institution |
|---|---|---|
| 2004 | Otmar Issing | European Central Bank |
| 2004 | Helmut Hesse | University of Göttingen |
| 2000 | Reinhard Mohn | Bertelsmann AG |
| 2000 | Marcus Bierich | Gesellschaft zur Förderung des Instituts für Weltwirtschaft |
| 1999 | Václav Klaus | Chamber of Deputies of the Czech Republic |
| 1995 | Herbert Grubel | Simon Fraser University |
| 1994 | Birgit Breuel | Treuhandanstalt |
| 1992 | Ingo Walter | New York University |
| 1992 | Helmut Schlesinger | Deutsche Bundesbank |
| 1991 | Juergen B. Donges | University of Cologne |
| 1989 | Tyll Necker | Bundesverband der Deutschen Industrie |
| 1989 | Karl Schiller | Jesteburg-Osterberg |
| 1988 | Rudolf Scheid | Frankfurt am Main |
| 1986 | Gerhard Fels | Kiel Institute for the World Economy |
| 1986 | Hans D. Barbier | Frankfurter Allgemeine Zeitung |
| 1984 | Karl Gustaf Ratjen | Kiel Institute for the World Economy |
| 1984 | Wolfgang F. Stolper | University of Michigan |
| 1983 | George Frank Ray | University of Greenwich |
| 1983 | Tadeusz M. Rybczynski | Lazard |
| 1981 | David Grove | IBM, University of Washington |
| 1980 | Kurt Pentzlin | Bahlsen |
| 1980 | Otto Ernst Pfleiderer | Heidelberg University |

=== Selected publications ===
- Zur Entwicklungsgeschichte der Deutschen Buchbinderei in der zweiten Hälfte des 19. Jahrhunderts, Tübingen und Leipzig 1902
- Die Münz- und Geldpolitik der Stadt Basel im Mittelalter. Tübingen 1907 (= Zeitschrift für die gesamte Staatswissenschaft, Ergänzungsheft 23)
- Der Stadthaushalt Basels im ausgehenden Mittelalter: Quellen und Studien zur Basler Finanzgeschichte. Tübingen 1909–1913
- Volkswirtschaft und Weltwirtschaft, Versuch der Begründung einer Weltwirtschaftslehre, Jena 1912
- Der auswärtige Handel in: Philipp Zorn, Herbert von Berger (Schriftleitung): Deutschland unter Kaiser Wilhelm II. Hrsg. von Siegfried Körte, Friedrich Wilhelm von Loebell u. a. 3 Bände. R. Hobbing, Berlin 1914.
- Ferdinand Lassalle und seine Bedeutung für die deutsche Sozialdemokratie [Kopie von 1919], Jena 1919
- Vom Wirtschaftskrieg zur Weltwirtschaftskonferenz, Jena 1927
- Strukturwandlungen der Deutschen Volkswirtschaft, Vorlesungen gehalten in der Deutschen Vereinigung für Staatswissenschaftliche Fortbildung. Berlin 1928
