= Gorg =

Gorg may refer to:

== Iran ==
- Gorg, Hamadan, Iran
- Gorg, Hirmand, Sistan and Baluchestan Province, Iran
- Mount Gorg, in the Alborz, a mountain range in northern Iran

== Spain ==
- Gorg, Badalona, a neighbourhood in Badalona, Catalonia, Spain
  - Gorg station, a metro and tram station serving the area

== People ==
- Ġorġ Borg Olivier, Maltese politician
- Ġorġ Mallia, Maltese communications academic, author and cartoonist
- Ġorġ Preca, Maltese Catholic priest
- Angelika Görg (1943–), German biochemist, expert of proteomics
- Galyn Görg (1956–2020), American actress
- Holger Görg, German economist
- Joseph Schmidt-Görg, German musicologist, composer and music editor
- Linus Görg (born 1994), German politician

== Other uses ==
- Gorgs, characters on the television series Fraggle Rock
