= Al Gorg =

Al Gorg or Algorg (Persian: ال گرگ) may refer to:

- Al Gorg, Hirmand, a village in Hirmand County, Sistan and Baluchestan Province, Iran
- Al Gorg, Zabol, a village in Sistan and Baluchestan Province, Iran

== See also ==
- Gorg (disambiguation)
