= Claus Lamm =

Austrian social neuroscientist

- Born: 1973 (age 52–53); Lustenau, Austria
- Awards: APS Lifetime Achievement Mentor Award 2024, Austrian Science Fund (FWF), Elected Board Member Austrian Academy of Sciences, Elected Corresponding Member Elisabeth Lutz Prize of the Austrian Academy of Sciences., Top Student Award 1997 (Foerderpreis des Bundesministeriums für Wissenschaft und Forschung)
- Scientific career
- Fields: Social neuroscience, Environmental neuroscience
- Workplaces: University of Vienna (professor, group leader), Austrian Academy of Sciences (corresponding member)

Claus Lamm (born in 1973 in Lustenau, Austria) is a professor of biological psychology and the head of the Social, Cognitive and Affective Neuroscience Unit at the Faculty of Psychology of the University of Vienna. His research focuses on the psychological and biological mechanisms underlying social cognition, affect, and behavior. His main research interest are the neural underpinnings of empathy, to whose understanding he has made pioneering contributions.

== Academic career and achievements ==
Claus Lamm received his diploma and Ph.D. in psychology from the University of Vienna. He then joined the lab of Jean Decety, first at the French Institute of Health and Medical Research (INSERM) in Bron, France (2005), and then at the University of Chicago (2006-2008). Subsequently, he joined Tania Singer’s research group at the Laboratory of Social and Neural Systems Research (founded by Ernst Fehr, University of Zurich). In 2010, Claus Lamm returned to the University of Vienna as a Professor of Biological Psychology.

He is the director and founder of the Social, Cognitive and Affective Neuroscience Unit, and currently also the vice dean of the Faculty of Psychology. Claus Lamm is a board member and co-director of the Cognitive Science Research Hub. He also established and directs the MRI Center of the University of Vienna. Together with Ludwig Huber he directs one of only a handful of comparative canine neuroimaging facilities that currently exist worldwide.

In 2014, he was elected to become a corresponding member of the Austrian Academy of Sciences, and he received the Elisabeth Lutz Prize by the same institution in recognition for his work on the biological and neural bases of social behavior. In 2024, he was a recipient of the APS Lifetime Achievement Mentor Award , and his research group for his 50th birthday wrote a "paper" to honor his mentoring style .

His research examines human social behavior using an interdisciplinary, multi-level approach. He combines behavioral and experimental psychology with methods from neuroimaging, electroencephalography, transcranial brain stimulation, psychopharmacology and psychoneuroendocrinology. He also actively collaborates with clinical investigators and with cognitive biologists. In several papers published in journals such as Proceedings of the National Academy of Sciences, Philosophical Transactions of the Royal Society B, The Journal of Neuroscience, and NeuroImage, Lamm and his collaborators were able to show that empathy is a complex construct for which two main components are essential: shared affective representations, and self-other distinction. More recently, he could show using the phenomenon of placebo analgesia that empathy for pain is grounded in self-experienced pain He has also been engaged in comparative research for several years, using behavioral and neuroscience approaches to gain a deeper understanding of the convergent evolution of empathy and related phenomena. Furthermore, one of his main research foci is environmental social neuroscience and the investigation of why people make pro-environmental decisions and how we can promote climate change mitigation, as well as how specific environments impact human health and well-being . This approach has also been highlighted in a perspective paper in Nature Climate Change (Doell et al., 2023).

== Selected works ==
- Doell, K.C., Berman, M.G., Bratman, G.N. et al. Leveraging neuroscience for climate change research. Nature Climate Change, 13, 1288–1297 (2023). https://doi.org/10.1038/s41558-023-01857-4
- Lamm, C., Bukowski, H., & Silani, G. (2016). From shared to distinct self–other representations in empathy: evidence from neurotypical function and socio-cognitive disorders. Philosophical Transactions of the Royal Society B, 371: 20150083. doi:10.1098/rstb.2015.0083
- Rütgen M., Seidel, E. M., Silani, G., Riecansky, G., Hummer, A., Windischberger, C., Petrovic, P. & Lamm, C. (2015). Placebo analgesia and its opioidergic regulation suggest that empathy for pain is grounded in self pain. Proceedings of the National Academy of Sciences, 112(41), E5638-E5646. doi:10.1073/pnas.1511269112
- Lamm C. & Majdandžić Y. (2015). The role of shared neural activations, mirror neurons, and morality in empathy – A critical comment. Neuroscience Research, 90, 15-24. doi:10.1016/j.neures.2014.10.008
- Lamm, C., Decety, J., & Singer, T. (2011). Meta-analytic evidence for common and distinct neural networks associated with directly experienced pain and empathy for pain. NeuroImage, 54(3), 2492-2502. doi:10.1016/j.neuroimage.2010.10.014
- Steininger, M.O., White, M.P., Lengersdorff, L., Zhang, L., Smalley, A.J., Kühn, S., & Lamm, C. (2015). Nature exposure induces analgesic effects by acting on nociception-related neural processing. Nature Communications, 16(1), 2037. doi: 10.1038/s41467-025-56870-2.
