= Global Economic Symposium =

- Genre: International conference
- Organizer: Kiel Institute for the World Economy and Bertelsmann Stiftung in cooperation with the German National Library of Economics (ZBW)
- People: Dennis J. Snower (director)
- Member: 400
- Website: www.global-economic-symposium.org

The Global Economic Symposium (abbreviated GES) is an annual conference organized by the Kiel Institute for the World Economy and the Bertelsmann Stiftung in cooperation with the German National Library of Economics (ZBW) – Leibniz Information Centre for Economics – that seeks to address global problems and formulate socially desirable responses. The GES primarily focuses on problems that cannot be solved by individual countries or organizations alone and therefore require global cooperation between leading policymakers, business executives, academics, and other representatives of civil communities. José Manuel Barroso, President of the European Commission, is the Patron of the GES. The conferences each year are attended by more than 400 people from around the globe, among them Nobel Laureates, Ministers, EU-Commissioners, CEOs and Academics.

== Annual meetings ==
=== GES 2008 ===
The first annual Global Economic Symposium convened at Schloss Plön Plön Castle in the city of Plön, Schleswig-Holstein, Germany, on September 4–5th 2008.

=== GES 2009 ===
The Global Economic Symposium (GES) 2009 addressed the question “Where do we go from here?”. The GES 2009 was also held at Schloss Plön on September 10–11th 2009.

=== GES 2010 ===
The GES 2010 addressed the issue of “Achieving Sustainability in the Face of Systemic Risks.” Hosted by the Central Bank of the Republic of Turkey, the GES 2010 took place in Istanbul on September 28- 29th 2010.

=== GES 2011 ===
The overarching theme of the GES 2011 is “New Forces of Global Governance”. The GES 2011 took place in Kiel, Schleswig-Holstein, Germany, the hometown of the Kiel Institute, on October 5–6th 2011.

The location of the GES continues to alternate between Schleswig-Holstein and a major international center. In 2012, it was planned to be held in Rio de Janeiro, Brazil.

== Organization ==
The Symposium is divided into four themes: The Global Economy, The Global Society, The Global Environment, and The Global Polity, each of which includes several panel sessions addressing specific problems relevant to the global economy. Unlike at other symposia, the sessions at the GES are meant to be primarily solution-oriented; that is, moderators are asked to focus discussions on suggested solutions. To avoid stifling creative thinking and open discussion, the session are off-the-record.

=== Advisory board ===
The Advisory Board of the GES provides advice on the development of the GES. It may suggest themes and special events at the GES, and helps attract insightful, top-flight participants. The honorary Chairperson of the Advisory Board is former German Chancellor Helmut Schmidt. Other members include Nobel Laureates, Ministers, CEOs and high-level representatives of the Civil Society.

=== Global Economic Partnership (GEP) ===
The Global Economic Partnership aims to identify business strategies and economic policies that address the challenges discussed during the GES.

=== Global Economic Solutions ===
The main publication of the GES, entitled Global Economic Solutions, summarizes areas of agreement and disagreement concerning suggested solutions to the problems discussed in each session. It is meant to stimulate an ongoing discussion that eventually feeds back into the next Global Economic Symposium. To this end, it is presented at major international institutions like the European Commission or the OECD. The Global Economic Solutions 2008/2009, 2009/2010 and 2010/2011 have been published by the Kiel Institute.

=== Participants ===
Participants of the GES take an active part in the open discussions following each panel debate. Furthermore, they have the right to contribute to the discussion of policy and strategy proposals in the Virtual GES, the web-based communication and information platform containing suggested policy recommendations and business strategies as well as state-of-the-art research publications.

=== Global Economic Fellows Program ===
The aim of the Global Economic Fellows Program is to promote the initiatives of young individuals in the mission of global problem-solving.

=== Global Economic Student Association (GESA) ===
The goal of the Global Economic Student Association (GESA) is to expose bright, active, promising students from around the world to the challenges of global problem-solving. Through this Community, university students are exposed to the debates on how to deal with major global problems and are called to contribute to this debate. Members of the GESA contribute their ideas on global problem-solving. The discussions will take place in the GESA Solution Fora. Members are invited to suggest and discuss topics of global importance and develop concrete solutions proposals for them. The authors of the best contributions will receive the GES Outstanding Young Scholars Award, entitling them to participation in the GES and interaction with the senior GES Community.

== Quotes ==
Dennis Snower (Director of the GES and President of the Kiel Institute for the World Economy): “The present Age of Globalization must now be supplemented by an Age of Global Cooperation, where shared goals motivate diverse stakeholders to pull in the same direction.”

Alessio Brown (Executive Director of the GES): "The GES is a facilitating movement. The underlying idea is that if we all join forces to solve problems that affect us all, we are more likely to recognize our common humanity and our common destiny than if we address global problems from the perspective of special interest groups or focus all our attention on national, cultural, and religious rivalries."

Josef Joffe (Publisher-Editor, DIE ZEIT) has commented;

“Take Germany’s most renowned economics institute, add one of the country’s most beautiful spots, Lake Ploen, and you get the Global Economic Symposium, a gathering of first-rate minds that will become a global household term.”
