= Gropp =

Gropp is a surname. Notable people with the surname include:

- Bill Gropp, American computer scientist
- Reint E. Gropp (born 1966), German economist
