= Active labor market policy in South Korea =

Active labour market policies are actions that governments take to help the unemployed back into work. In South Korea, they are administered under the direct supervision of the Ministry of Labor and Employment. They involve subsidized education, vocational training, direct monetary support, and low interest loans.

== Background ==
The South Korean government, following the end of the Korean War, had little need for active labor market policies. Records from the Korea Labor Institute show that up to 10.4% of Korea's population was unemployed in 1963. Additionally, Korea's largest exports at the time were shoes, wigs, and plywood: all items that are produced through low skilled labor. Through the 1970s, the transfer of workers from the majority agrarian population into urban light industry provided a steady source of labor for Korean firms. Additionally, the constant need for low to medium skilled work gave workers an unwritten job security. Most workers enjoyed the benefits of proper notification and a chance to challenge unfair dismissal. This system continued well into the 1990s, by which point the Miracle on the Han River had caused miraculous levels of economic growth. The Korean market, by this point, was dominated by large family-run conglomerates known as chaebols. The unemployment crisis faced by the nascent South Korea were the least of the nation's concerns by the 1990s: studies report that by 1997, only 2.5% of Koreans were unemployed. However, the sharp downturn the Korean economy experienced later that year during the Asian Economic Crisis proved the need for an active labor market policy and marked the end of labor elasticity and the postwar economic miracle in Korea.

== Establishment ==
The crisis continued into the new millennium and with it came the end of Korean industry giant Daewoo and other prominent chaebols. As such, the nation experienced heavy spikes in unemployment, rising to near 8.7% unemployment rate by February 1999. The D.C based think tank, Brookings Institution states that an 8.7% employment rate in Korea is similar, in intensity, to a 13% unemployment rate in other OECD nations. This is attributed to the weakness of Korean social services and the lack of women in the labor force to support unemployed husbands. In response to the national and regional crisis, a tripartite commission under the Dae-jung government authored the first active labor market legislature in the Korean government. This included clauses that weakened unemployment protection. However, legislature like the Dispatched Worker's Act created new, temporary, short-term jobs for workers who had been laid off or out of work. Social expenditure under this commission's policy accounted for 4.8% of the total budget between 1997 and 2003, compared to 2.3% between 1990 and 1996. This expansion led to the creation of what is classified as "non-regular labor" by the Korean government, which were originally meant to curb unemployment during the market recovery. The rise of these "non-regular" positions led to the birth of a polarizing insider–outsider structure in the Korean labor market. Scholars commonly refer to this situation as labor market duality in Korea.

== Unemployment benefits ==
- Unemployment benefits are primarily administered through employment insurance, which is one of the main four insurances in South Korea.
- Unemployment Pay: designed to support the unemployed with monetary assistance so that they can maintain their financial stability until they can find another employment.

Eligibility:

1. The unemployed must have accumulated at least 180 working hours within the past 180 days prior to unemployment.
2. Involuntary employment due to the employer's management circumstance.
3. Unemployment status despite with willingness to work, while actively searching for reemployment.

The duration of the benefit can be extended to 240 days depending on the age and the duration of the beneficiary's unemployment insurance status.

- Education and training Opportunities for Unemployed: Employment Insurance pays for unemployed workers' education fee if the beneficiary voluntarily applies to a training program for the purpose of seeking reemployment. It is designed to assist the beneficiary in finding reemployment by providing an opportunity to develop their job-related skills. Furthermore, Employment Insurance works in conjunction with civilian vocational training programs and Korea Chamber of Commerce and Industry.

== Vocational training and education opportunities ==
- The government provides training programs for free in the industries that are expected to grow and deemed strategically in demand in the future.
- "Learning for Tomorrow" Program: It provides an opportunity for the unemployed to obtain vocational skills development.
- Low-interest loans up to 2,000 South Korean won per month at the rate of 1% are offered while in such programs to ensure the trainees can fully participate in the training programs.
