= Arbeit =

Arbeit is a word of the German language which means "work" or "labour".

- Arbeit in Japan and South Korea, a form of part-time job as practiced in Japan (where it is called arubaito [アルバイト], and often shortened as baito [バイト]) and South Korea (where it is called areubaiteu [아르바이트], and often shortened as alba [알바])
  - Part-time jobs in South Korea, an overview of the situations in South Korea

It is also a surname, and may refer to:

- Arnold Arbeit (1911–1974), American artist and architect
- Jochen Arbeit, German guitarist

== See also ==
- Arbeit macht frei, a German phrase meaning "work makes (you) free", known for being placed over Nazi concentration camps entrances
- Work (disambiguation)
- Labour (disambiguation)
