= Gabriel Felbermayr =

Austrian economist

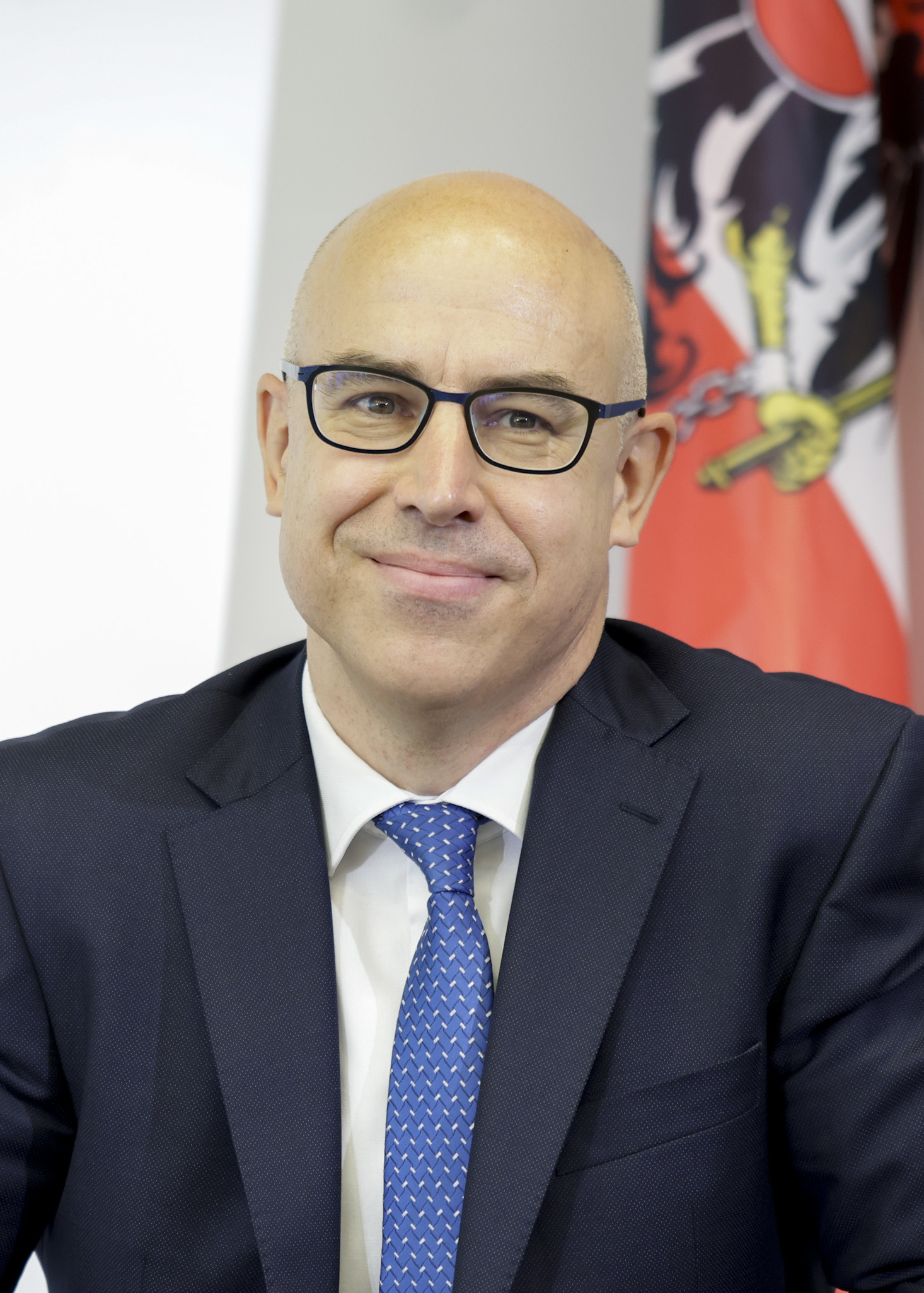
- Born: Gabriel Felbermayr; June 24, 1976 (age 50); Steyr, Austria
- Education: Johannes Kepler University (Magister), European University Institute (PhD)
- Occupations: Incoming President of the Kiel Institute for the World Economy and Professor of Economics at Kiel University

Gabriel Felbermayr (born 24 June 1976) is an Austrian economist who has been serving as president of the Austrian Institute of Economic Research (WIFO) since 2021. In addition, he has been serving as member of the German Council of Economic Experts since 2026.

Felbermayr specializes in international economics, international trade agreements, economic policy, and environmental economics. Considered a leading economist in the field of international economics, he is cited in the top 5% of all economists and has been referred to as "Germany's Chief Economist of the North" ("Deutschlands neuer Chefökonom des Nordens").

Early in his career, Felbermayr was a professor of economics at LMU Munich and Director of the Ifo Institute for Economic Research, which is based in Munich. From 2019 to 2021, he was the president of the Kiel Institute for the World Economy.

== Early life and education ==
Felbermayr was born on 24 June 1976 in Steyr, Austria. From 1986 to 1994, he attended the Gymnasium der Abtei Schlierbach in Schlierbach, Austria, where he graduated summa cum laude. He then continued his education at the Classe Préparatoire aux Hautes Études Commerciales in Vienna. In 1995, he began his studies at the Johannes Kepler University in Linz, receiving both a Magister in Economics and in International Business Administration in 2000. From 2000 to 2004, he joined the PhD program in Economics at the European University Institute in Florence, Italy, under the supervision of Omar Licandro.

== Career ==
From 2003 to 2004, Felbermayr worked as a university assistant at the University of Linz.

After graduating, Felbermayr worked as an Associate Consultant at McKinsey & Company in Vienna. He also became an academic councilor at the University of Tübingen. He subsequently completed his habilitation with a thesis on trade and unemployment under the supervision of Claudia Buch. He has had various academic posts at the University of Konstanz, the University of Zurich, and the University of Nottingham. From 2008 to 2011, he worked as a professor of economics at the University of Hohenheim in Stuttgart.

From 2011, Felbermayr was a professor of economics at LMU Munich, where he regularly taught courses on Microeconomics, International Finance, and Economic Growth.

Felbermayr is an associate editor for the European Economic Review and the International Review of Economics and Finance. He has also been a board member of the European Trade Study Group since 2014. He also serves as a member of the Board of Academic Advisors at the Federal Ministry for Economic Affairs and Energy.

=== Kiel Institute for the World Economy, 2019–2021 ===
In March 2019, Felbermayr replaced current president Dennis J. Snower of the Kiel Institute for the World Economy, who had reached the compulsory age of retirement. Prime Minister of Schleswig-Holstein Daniel Günther and State Minister of Science Karin Prien confirmed Felbermayr succession, believing the Institute's focus would shift to issues on custom duties, free trade agreements, and the intersection of politics and society. Felbermayr aimed to maintain the Institute's "world economic profile".

== Other activities ==
- Foundation for Family Businesses in Germany and Europe, Member of the Advisory Board
- German-African Business Association (AV), Member of the Scientific Advisory Board
- German Institute for International and Security Affairs (SWP), Member of the Scientific Advisory Board
- Herbert Giersch Stiftung, Member of the Advisory Board
- Institute for Applied Economic Research (IAW), University of Tübingen, Member of the Scientific Advisory Council
- Wirtschaftsdienst, Member of the Scientific Advisory Board

== Honors and awards ==
Felbermayr has published numerous articles in learned journals such as the Review of Economics and Statistics, the International Economic Review, the Journal of International Economics, and the American Economic Journal. Some of his notable honors and awards include:

- Most cited article, Journal of Economic Theory, 2015
- Ralph C. d'Arge and Allen V. Kneese Award, Journal of the Association of Environmental and Resource Economists, 2013
- Economist Rankings, Handelsblatt, 2015
- Reinhard Selten Award Association for Social Policy, German Economic Association (Verein für Socialpolitik), 2007
- Young Economist Award, Austrian Economic Association (Nationalökonomischen Gesellschaft), 2007
- Theodor Körner Prize, University of Vienna (Universität Wien), 2004
- Franz Weninger Prize, (Oesterreichische Nationalbank), 2000

== Personal life ==
Felbermayr is married to Sophie Tareau, a French citizen. The couple has three daughters.
