= Gemeinschaftsdiagnose =

Semiannual economic report

Die Gemeinschaftsdiagnose
- Discipline: Economics
- Language: German

Publication details
- History: 1950–present
- Publisher: Kiel Institute for the World Economy (IfW), German Institute for Economic Research (DIW), Ifo Institute for Economic Research (Ifo), Halle Institute for Economic Research (IWH), RWI Essen (RWI) (Germany)
- Frequency: Semiannual

Standard abbreviations
- ISO 4: Gemeinschaftsdiagnose

Indexing
- ISSN: 0018-974X
- OCLC no.: 263668009

Links
- Journal homepage

The Joint Economic Forecast (Gemeinschaftsdiagnose, GD) is a semiannual report that aims to analyze the German and the world economy, while also providing in-depth policy recommendations for the German Federal Government. Each publication comprises a projection for the current and following years, along with a special study of varying topics. First published in 1950, the GD is prepared by Germany's leading economic research institutes, which are members of the Leibniz Association.

== History ==
The GD, originally known as the Forecast, began in 1950 under the direction of six institutes, which were then members of the Association of German Economic Research Institutes (ARGE). It began in the years of post-World War 2 reconstruction as a means of facilitating Germany's reintegration into the global economy. The participating institutes until 2007 included:

- Kiel Institute for the World Economy (IfW)
- German Institute for Economic Research (DIW)
- Hamburg World Economic Archive (HWWA, until 2006)
- Ifo Institute - Leibniz Institute for Economic Research at the University of Munich (ifo)
- Institute for Economic Research Halle (IWH)
- Rheinisch-Westfälisches Institut für Wirtschaftsforschung (RWI)

From 2007 to 2010, with the dissolution of the HWWA in 2006, the DIW also ceased publication of the report. The Federal Government had reservations about the efficiency of the institute due to the departure of experienced DIW employees. The GD was then published by:

- Kiel Institute for the World Economy (IfW)
- Ifo Institute - Leibniz Institute for Economic Research at the University of Munich (ifo)
- Rheinisch-Westfälisches Institut für Wirtschaftsforschung (RWI)
- Business Center of the Swiss Federal Institute of Technology (ETH)
- Halle Institute for Economic Research (IWH)
- Macroeconomic Policy Institute (IMK)
- Austrian Institute for Economic Research (WIFO)
- Institute for Advanced Studies

From 2010 to 2013, three new institutes were added to the project: KOF Swiss Economic Institute at ETH Zurich and the Center for European Economic Research. In 2013, the latter left the group. After a series of dissolutions and departures, the five current institutes that write the report are:

- Kiel Institute for the World Economy (IfW)
- German Institute for Economic Research (DIW)
- Ifo Institute - Leibniz Institute for Economic Research at the University of Munich (ifo)
- Rheinisch-Westfälisches Institut für Wirtschaftsforschung (RWI)
- Halle Institute for Economic Research (IWH)

== Publication ==
The GD is Germany's leading economic report that generates economic forecasts and produces policy recommendations. It is nominally produced by the Project Group Community Diagnosis (Institute der Projektgruppe Gemeinschaftsdiagnose), an independent group of economists from each represented economic institute. The results of the publication are subsequently discussed by representatives of the Federal Ministry for Economic Affairs and Energy and Energy and the Federal Ministry of Finance and serve as the basis for their economic forecasts. Key areas of discussion in recent reports include free trade agreements, demographic changes in Germany, and tax reform.
