= PEGNet =

German research network

PEGNet is a research network in Germany. The Poverty Reduction, Equity and Growth Network was founded in 2005 as a joint initiative of the Kiel Institute for the World Economy, Germany's (Federal Ministry for Economic Cooperation and Development), its implementing agencies Deutsche Gesellschaft für Internationale Zusammenarbeit and KfW Entwicklungsbank as well as the universities of Göttingen and Frankfurt. PEGNet‘s mission is to foster research cooperation between academic institutions working on poverty issues in developing countries and to intensify the exchange of knowledge between researchers and development practitioners.

The founding institutions were later joined by other research institutions, individual researchers and practitioners from all over the world. Notable examples include the London-based Overseas Development Institute (Overseas Development Institute), the Paris-based think tank DIAL (Développement, Institutions et Ajustement à Long terme), and the Southern Africa Labour and Development Research Unit in Cape Town.

As of 2011, PEGNet had more than 100 institutional and individual members.
