= Herbert Giersch =

German economist (1921–2010)

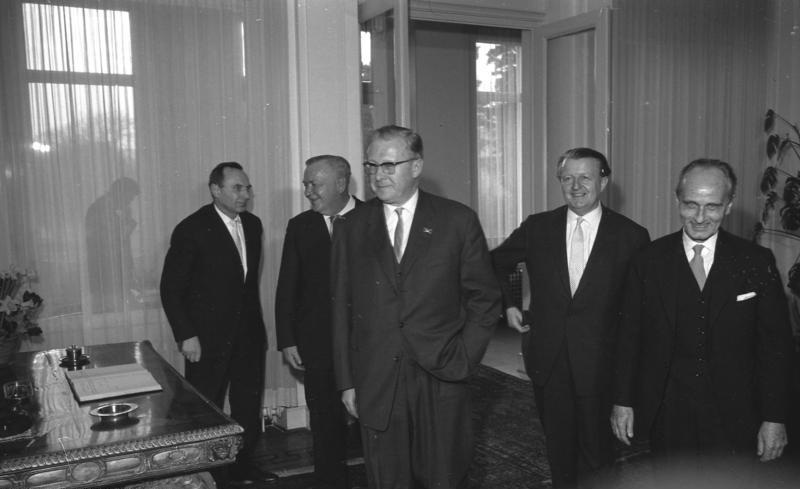
- Herbert Giersch (left)
- Born: 11 May 1921; Reichenbach im Eulengebirge, Prussia, Germany
- Died: 22 July 2010 (aged 89); Saarbrücken, Germany

Academic background
- Education: University of Kiel; University of Breslau
- Influences: John Maynard Keynes; Joseph Schumpeter; Friedrich Hayek; Robert Solow

Academic work
- Discipline: Political economics
- School or tradition: Neo-Keynesian economics
- Institutions: Kiel Institute for the World Economy

Herbert Giersch (11 May 1921 – 22 July 2010) was a German economist. He was one of the initial members of the German Council of Economic Experts in 1964, serving on the council until 1970, and also was president of the Kiel Institute for the World Economy 1969–1989. Giersch was considered the most influential German economist during the chancellorships of Willy Brandt, Helmut Schmidt, and Helmut Kohl.

Born in Reichenbach, Silesia, Giersch attended the University of Breslau and the University of Kiel between 1939 and 1942, until he was drafted to serve in World War II. Returning from war captivity, he earned his Ph.D. in economics from the University of Münster in 1948. Giersch received a full professorship at the Saarland University in 1955. In 1969, he succeeded Erich Schneider at the University of Kiel, and held that chair until 1989.

Originally adherent to Keynesian economics in the 1950s and 1960s, he gradually became an advocate of supply-side economics in his later years.

In 1985, Giersch coined the term "Eurosklerose" to describe Europe's political and economic stagnation during the 1970s and 1980s. He was also a co-signatory of the Eurosceptic manifesto "Die währungspolitischen Beschlüsse von Maastricht: Eine Gefahr für Europa" (1992). Additionally, Giersch is credited with introducing the concept of the "Diktat der leeren Kassen" ("dictate of empty coffers"), a political strategy aimed at enforcing cuts in government spending despite public resistance. Rather than directly reducing social expenditures, Giersch advocated for shrinking the state's revenue base through tax cuts, thereby limiting its fiscal maneuverability.

Giersch was actively involved in numerous academic organizations. From 1960 to 2007, he served as a member of the Scientific Advisory Board to the German Federal Ministry for Economic Affairs and Technology.[4] In 1991, he was elected to the Order Pour le Mérite for Sciences and Arts.

The Herbert Giersch Foundation, based in Frankfurt am Main, is named in his honor.

== See also ==
- Eurosclerosis
