= Eurosclerosis =

Term to describe a pattern of economic stagnation in Europe

Eurosclerosis (German: Eurosklerose) is a term coined by German economist Herbert Giersch in the 1970s, to describe a pattern of economic stagnation in Europe that was alleged to have resulted from government over-regulation and overly generous social benefits policies. The term alludes to the medical term sclerosis, and is a rhyme of the archaic term neurosclerosis.

The term was used to describe European countries of the 1970s and 1980s which had high unemployment and slow job creation in spite of overall economic growth, in contrast to what the United States experienced in the same period when economic expansion was accompanied by high job growth. In its political context, the term "eurosclerosis" was used to describe a period with a perceived stagnation of European integration. The slow pace of enlargement, a perceived lack of democracy and economic problems meant that negative and apathetic attitudes to the European Economic Community (EEC) were high.

Wilfried Martens, Prime Minister of Belgium from 1981 to 1992, states in his 2008 memoirs that the period of "eurosclerosis" was brought to an end by the 1986 Single European Act which re-launched the drive to integration by framing the single market of the EEC.

As an economic term, "eurosclerosis" has later been used more broadly to refer to overall economic stagnation. According to Paul Krugman and the US Federal Reserve, at least one alleged victim of Eurosclerosis (France) has gone from having a lower employment than the US in 1999, to a significantly higher employment rate following the Great Recession (2007–2009).

== See also ==
- European integration
- Single European Act
- Welfarism
