= Review of World Economics =

- Discipline: International economics
- Language: English
- Edited by: Dennis Snower

Publication details
- History: 1913–present
- Publisher: Springer Publishing
- Frequency: Quarterly
- Impact factor: 1.383 (2014)

Standard abbreviations
- ISO 4: Rev. World Econ.

Indexing
- ISSN: 1610-2878 (print); 1610-2886 (web)
- JSTOR: 16102878
- OCLC no.: 801819617

Links
- Journal homepage; Online archive

Review of World Economics is a peer-reviewed quarterly journal of international economics. It is published by Springer on behalf of the Kiel Institute for the World Economy. Under the name Weltwirtschaftliches Archiv, it was founded in 1913 as the world's first journal with a focus on international economics. In 2003, it was renamed to Review of World Economics. The journal's main areas of publication include international trade, international finance, currency systems and exchange rates, monetary and fiscal policies, economic development, and technological growth. According to the Journal Citation Reports by Thomson Reuters, the journal has a 2017 impact factor of 1.383, ranking it 18th out of 85 journals in the category "International Relations".
