= Tania Singer =

German social neuroscientist (1969-)

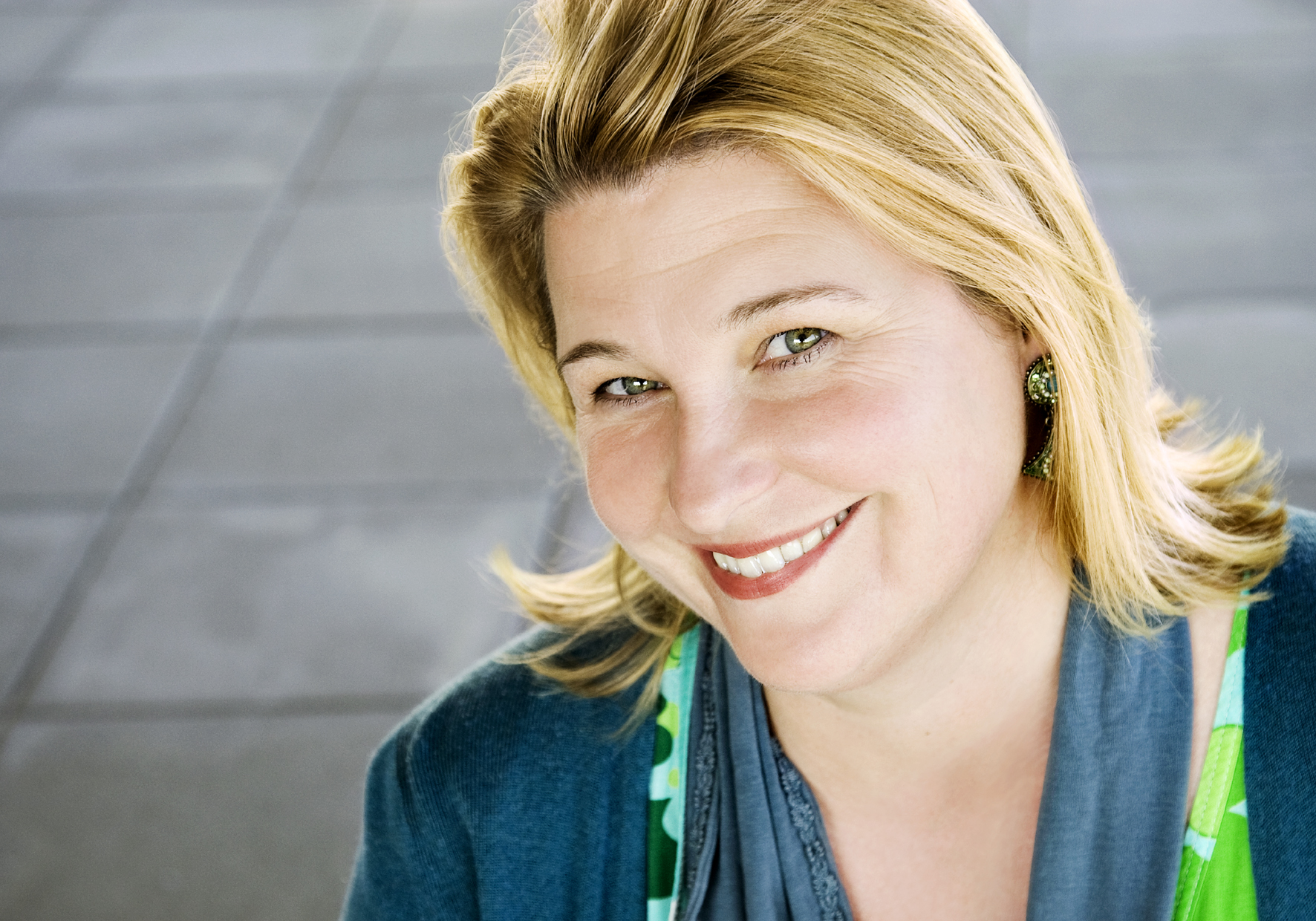
- Born: 1969 (age 56–57); Munich, Germany
- Education: Freie Universität Berlin
- Awards: Otto Hahn Medal of the Max Planck Society for the best dissertation of the year 2000
- Scientific career
- Fields: Social neuroscience, Neuroeconomics, Contemplative Science
- Workplaces: Social Neuroscience Lab, Max Planck Society (professor, Scientific Head)
- Website: www.social.mpg.de

Tania Singer (born 1969) is a German psychologist and social neuroscientist and the scientific director of the Max Planck Society's Social Neuroscience Lab in Berlin, Germany. Between 2007 and 2010, she became the inaugural chair of social neuroscience and neuroeconomics at the University of Zurich and was the co-director of the Laboratory for Social and Neural Systems Research in Zurich. Her research focuses on the developmental, neuronal, and hormonal mechanisms underlying human social behavior and social emotions such as compassion and empathy. She is founder and principal investigator of the ReSource project, one of the largest longitudinal studies on the effects of mental training on brain plasticity as well as mental and physical health, co-funded by the European Research Council. She also collaborates with the macro-economist Dennis Snower on research on caring economics. Singer's Caring Economics: Conversations on Altruism and Compassion, Between Scientists, Economists, and the Dalai Lama was published in 2015. She is the daughter of the neuroscientist Wolf Singer.

== Education and academic career ==
Singer studied psychology at the University of Marburg from 1989 to 1992. From 1992 to 1996 she studied psychology, media psychology, and media counseling at Technische Universität Berlin, graduating with a Diplom in 1996. She was a predoctoral fellow at the Max Planck Institute for Human Development in Berlin and received her Ph.D. from the Free University of Berlin in 2000, for which she was awarded the Otto Hahn Medal of the Max Planck Society. She then continued to work at the Max Planck Institute as a research scientist at the Center for Lifespan Psychology until 2002.

After a period at the Wellcome Department of Imaging Neuroscience and then at the Institute of Cognitive Neuroscience in London, UK, she became an assistant professor at the University of Zurich in 2006. From 2007 to 2009, she was co-director of the Laboratory for Social and Neural Systems Research, and in 2008, she was appointed as the inaugural chair of social neuroscience and neuroeconomics at the University of Zurich. In 2010 she became the director of the Max Planck Institute for Human Cognitive and Brain Sciences in Leipzig, Germany. Between 2011 and 2019, she held honorary professorships at the University of Leipzig and the Humboldt University, Berlin. She is also an honorary research fellow at the Laboratory for Social and Neural Systems Research of the University of Zurich as well as an honorary board member of Mind and Life Europe. In 2019, she became the scientific director of the Social Neuroscience Lab in Berlin, Germany.

== Research ==
Singer's work focuses on social cognition; social moral emotions such as empathy, compassion, envy, and fairness; social decision making; and communication. She is interested in the determinants of cooperation and prosocial behavior as well as the breakdown of cooperation and the emergence of selfish behavior. Her research uses a range of methods including functional magnetic resonance imaging, virtual reality environments, biological markers such as cortisol, and behavioral studies.

Singer was a board member and vice president of the Mind and Life Institute and is now an honorary board member of Mind and Life Europe. She has worked with the French Buddhist monk Matthieu Ricard to investigate brain activity during meditation. Together, they helped organize two large-scale Mind and Life Conferences with the Dalai Lama in 2010 in Zürich and again in 2016 in Brussels. Two books resulted from these two conferences:Caring Economics and Power and Care. Singer is the author of more than 150 peer-reviewed articles and book chapters.

Talk at the World Economic Forum, Davos, 2015

Singer founded and is principal investigator of the ReSource Project, a large-scale one-year longitudinal mental training study co-funded by the European Research Council since 2008. This is a longitudinal investigation of the long-term effects of different types of mental training (ranging from practices based on mindfulness and compassion to perspective-taking) on well-being, brain plasticity, prosocial behavior, stress reduction, and health in more than 300 participants using 90 different measurements. So far, more than 30 scientific papers have been published based on the data assessed between 2013 and 2016. Results show for example that mental training reduces social stress and has effects on changes in structural brain plasticity.

Another research focus is on how social cognition and motivations can explain human social interaction and human economic decision making. The new research program on caring economics, co-funded by the Institute for New Economic Thinking (INET) between 2013 and 2017, carried out in collaboration with Professor Dennis J. Snower, former president of the Kiel Institute of World Economy, explores new avenues of how psychological and neuroscientific knowledge about human motivation, emotion, and social cognition can inform models of economic decision making in addressing global economic problems.

In a paper published in the journal Science in 2004, Singer showed that some pain-sensitive regions of the brain are also activated when volunteers experience their partners feeling pain. In follow-up studies, published in the journals Nature and Neuron, she showed that empathy-related brain responses are influenced by the perceived fairness of others and by whether a target belonged to an ingroup or outgroup.

Based on earlier studies she did with the Buddhist monk Matthieu Ricard, she further showed that the neural circuits underlying empathic responses to the suffering of others (feeling with someone) are different from the neural networks underlying compassion (feeling concern for someone paired with a motivation to help). Whereas empathy is associated with negative emotions and can lead to burn-out if it turns into empathic distress, compassion comes with positive feelings of care and warmth and can boost resilience in the face of suffering.

Singer also has a long-standing interest in collaboration between arts and science and for example produced the multi-media, free-downloadable e-book Compassion: Bridging Practice and Science together with the artist Olafur Eliasson.

== Controversy ==
In August 2018, Science Magazine reported that Singer bullied several of her employees. Difficulties were brought up by team members during a meeting with the scientific advisory board in February 2017 as a part of the institute's official evaluation. An internal investigation did not find evidence for scientific misconduct but confirmed failures in leadership. In a press release, the Max Planck Society acknowledged that partial anonymity of the accusations was not lifted which "made it more difficult for the director to respond to the allegations". However, employees' names were known to the internal commission and evidence of bullying was brought for review to the investigation committee as well. Singer resigned from her director position and became Professor and scientific Head of the Social Neuroscience Lab of the Max Planck Society in Berlin.

== Awards and selected memberships ==
- 2000: Otto Hahn Medal of the Max Planck Society
- 2011: Honorary Research Fellow at the Laboratory for Social and Neural Systems Research at the University of Zurich, Switzerland
- Since 2014: Vicepresident of the Board, Mind & Life Europe, Zurich, Switzerland
- Since 2013: Member, Young Academy of Europe (YAE), Europa
- Since 2012: Board Member, Mind & Life Institute (MLI), Hadley, MA, USA
- Since 2011: Member, European Initiative for Integrative Psychological Science, Association for Psychological Science (APS)

== Selected publications ==
A complete publication list of Tania Singer can be found on her website.

- Singer, T. & Ricard, M. & Karius, K. (2019). Power and Care: Conversations toward balance for our common future - Science, society, and spirituality. New York: MIT Press. ISBN 978-0262039529
- Singer, T. & Ricard, M. (2015). Caring economics: Conversations on altruism and compassion, between scientists, economists, and the Dalai Lama (pp. 240). New York: Picador. ISBN 978-1250064127
- Singer, T. & Bolz, M. (2013). Compassion. Bridging Practice and Science. Max Planck Society. ISBN 978-3-9815612-1-0. E-Book
- Singer, T., & Engert, V. (2019). It matters what you practice: Differential training effects on subjective experience, behavior, brain and body in the ReSource Project. Current Opinion in Psychology, 28, 151–158. https://doi.org/10.1016/j.copsyc.2018.12.005
- Engert, V., Kok, B. E., Papassotiriou, I., Chrousos, G. P., & Singer, T. (2017). Specific reduction in cortisol stress reactivity after social but not attention-based mental training. Science Advances, 3(10): e1700495. https://doi.org/10.1126/sciadv.1700495
- Kok, B. E., & Singer, T. (2017). Effects of contemplative dyads on engagement and perceived social connectedness over 9 months of mental training: A randomized clinical trial. JAMA Psychiatry, 74(2), 126-134. https://doi.org/10.1001/jamapsychiatry.2016.3360
- Valk, S. L., Bernhardt, B. C., Trautwein, M., Böckler, A., Kanske, P., Guizard, N., Collins, D. L., & Singer, T. (2017). Structural plasticity of the social brain: Differential change after socio-affective and cognitive mental training. Science Advances, 3(10): e1700489. https://doi.org/10.1126/sciadv.1700489
- Steinbeis, N., Bernhardt, B. C., & Singer, T. (2015). Age-related differences in function and structure of rSMG and reduced functional connectivity with DLPFC explains heightened emotional egocentricity bias in childhood. Social Cognitive and Affective Neuroscience, 10(2), 302-310. https://doi.org/10.1093/scan/nsu057
- Singer, T. (2012). The past, present and future of social neuroscience: A European perspective. NeuroImage, 61 (2), 437–449. https://doi.org/10.1016/j.neuroimage.2012.01.109.
- Lamm, C., Decety, J., & Singer, T. (2011). Meta-analytic evidence for common and distinct neural networks associated with directly experienced pain and empathy for pain. NeuroImage, 54 (3), 2492–2502. https://doi.org/10.1016/j.neuroimage.2010.10.014.
- Singer, T., Seymour, B., O'Doherty, J. P., Stephan, K. E., Dolan, R. J., & Frith, C. D. (2006). Empathic neural responses are modulated by the perceived fairness of others. Nature, 439, 466–469. https://doi.org/10.1038/nature04271.
- Singer, T., Seymour, B., O'Doherty, J., Kaube, H., Dolan, R. J., & Frith, C. D. (2004). Empathy for pain involves the affective but not sensory components of pain. Science, 303 (5661), 1157–1162. https://doi/10.1126/science.1093535.
