= Wolfgang Wiegard =

German economist

- Born: 17 February 1946 (age 80); Berlin, Germany

Academic work
- Discipline: Public finance
- School or tradition: Neoclassical economics

Wolfgang Wiegard (born 17 February 1946) is a German economist and member of the German Council of Economic Experts. He served as chairman of the council from April 2002 to March 2005.

Born in Berlin, Wiegard studied at the University of Heidelberg, receiving his doctoral degree in economics in 1981. Since 1999 Wiegard holds a tenured professorship in economics at the University of Regensburg.

Wiegard is considered a strong proponent of neoclassical supply-side economics. He is also a member of the Social Democratic Party of Germany.
