= Reint E. Gropp =

German economist

Reint E. Gropp (born 21 December 1966, in Bottrop) is a German economist, the president of the Halle Institute for Economic Research (IWH) as well as professor of economics at Otto-von-Guericke University Magdeburg. His fields of research cover financial economics, macroeconomics, corporate finance as well as money and banking.

== Life ==
Gropp studied economics at the University of Freiburg and the University of Wisconsin, Madison. He obtained his PhD in economics from the University of Wisconsin in 1994. He worked for the International Monetary Fund in Washington, D.C. from 1994 to 1999 and for the European Central Bank from 1999 to 2007, most recently as deputy head of the Financial Research Division. After that, Gropp was professor of financial economics and taxation at EBS University Wiesbaden until 2012. From 2012 to 2014, he held a chair of sustainable banking and finance at the House of Finance, Goethe University Frankfurt am Main.

Since November 2014, Gropp is president of the Halle Institute for Economic Research and professor of economics at Otto-von-Guericke University Magdeburg. He is fellow of the Center for Financial Studies, Frankfurt am Main, and associate editor of the Review of Finance. He serves as a consultant for the Bank of Canada and the Federal Reserve Bank of San Francisco.

Gropp made headlines in 2019 when his institute published a study proving that East German companies are 20 percent less productive than their West German equivalents. Gropp blamed the continuous subsidy policy and recommended no longer supporting rural areas but focusing on cities instead.

== Affiliations ==
- Professor of Economics, Otto von Guericke University Magdeburg (since 2014)
- Member, Expert Group on the Economic and Societal Impact of Research and Innovation (ESIR)
- Research Fellow, Center for European Studies (CefES), Milan (since 2019)
- Fellow, Center for Economic Policy Research (CEPR), London (since 2019)
- Fellow, Center for Financial Studies (CFS), Frankfurt am Main (since 2008)
- Visiting professor, University of Amsterdam (2014)
- Visiting financial economist, Federal Reserve Bank of San Francisco (2012)
- Duisenberg fellow, European Central Bank, Frankfurt am Main (2012)

== Selected publications ==
- Gropp, Reint; Mosk, Thomas; Ongena, Steven; Simac, Ines; Wix, Carlo (2024). "Supranational Rules, National Discretion: Increasing Versus Inflating Regulatory Bank Capital?". Journal of Financial and Quantitative Analysis. 59 (2): 830–862. doi:10.1017/S002210902300025X. ISSN 0022-1090.
- Baessler, Laura; Gebhardt, Georg; Gropp, Reint; Guettler, Andre; Taskin, Ahmed (2024). "Do Public Bank Guarantees Affect Labor Market Outcomes?". IWH Discussion Papers (7). ISSN 2194-2188.
- Gropp, Reint; Guettler, Andre; Saadi, Vahid (2020). "Public bank guarantees and allocative efficiency". Journal of Monetary Economics. 116: 53–69. doi:10.1016/j.jmoneco.2019.09.006. ISSN 0304-3932.
- Behr, Patrick; Drexler, Alejandro H.; Gropp, Reint; Guettler, Andre (2014). "Financial Incentives and Loan Officer Behavior: Multitasking and Allocation of Effort Under an Incomplete Contract". SSRN Electronic Journal. doi:10.2139/ssrn.2466294. ISSN 1556-5068.
- Damar, H. Evren; Gropp, Reint; Mordel, Adi (2020). "Banks' Funding Stress, Lending Supply, and Consumption Expenditure". Journal of Money, Credit and Banking. 52 (4): 685–720. doi:10.1111/jmcb.12673. ISSN 0022-2879.
- Gropp, Reint; Mosk, Thomas; Ongena, Steven; Wix, Carlo (2019-01-01). "Banks Response to Higher Capital Requirements: Evidence from a Quasi-Natural Experiment". The Review of Financial Studies. 32 (1): 266–299. doi:10.1093/rfs/hhy052. ISSN 0893-9454.
- Corradin, Stefano; Gropp, Reint; Huizinga, Harry; Laeven, Luc (2016-01-01). "The effect of personal bankruptcy exemptions on investment in home equity". Journal of Financial Intermediation. 25: 77–98. doi:10.1016/j.jfi.2015.04.001. ISSN 1042-9573.
- Gropp, Reint; Guettler, Andre; Saadi, Vahid (2020-12-01). "Public bank guarantees and allocative efficiency". Journal of Monetary Economics. 116: 53–69. doi:10.1016/j.jmoneco.2019.09.006. ISSN 0304-3932.
- Adams, Zeno; Füss, Roland; Gropp, Reint (June 2014). "Spillover Effects among Financial Institutions: A State-Dependent Sensitivity Value-at-Risk Approach". Journal of Financial and Quantitative Analysis. 49 (3): 575–598. doi:10.1017/S0022109014000325. ISSN 0022-1090.
- Gropp, Reint; Gruendl, Christian; Guettler, Andre (2014-04-01). "The Impact of Public Guarantees on Bank Risk-Taking: Evidence from a Natural Experiment". Review of Finance. 18 (2): 457–488. doi:10.1093/rof/rft014. ISSN 1573-692X.
- Gropp, Reint; Boissay, Frédéric (2007). "Trade Credit Defaults and Liquidity Provision By Firms". SSRN Electronic Journal. doi:10.2139/ssrn.966281. ISSN 1556-5068.
- Gropp, Reint; Kadareja, Arjan (2006). "Stale Information, Shocks and Volatility". SSRN Electronic Journal. doi:10.2139/ssrn.936891. ISSN 1556-5068.
- Gropp, Reint; Hakenes, Hendrik; Schnabel, Isabel (June 2011). "Competition, Risk-shifting, and Public Bail-out Policies". Review of Financial Studies. 24 (6): 2084–2120. doi:10.1093/rfs/hhq114. ISSN 0893-9454 – via Oxford Academic.
