= Marcus Bierich =

Post war German business person

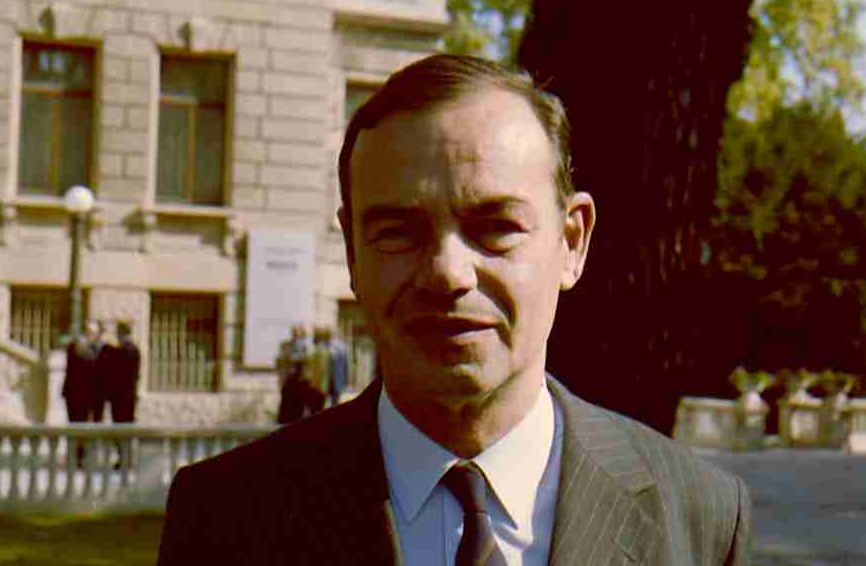
Marcus Bierich (1986)

Marcus Bierich (29 April 1926 in Hamburg - 25 November 2000 in Stuttgart) was CFO for Mannesmann AG from 1961 to 1980 (what became Vodafone) in Düsseldorf; CFO for Allianz AG from 1980 to 1984 in Munich; CEO for Robert Bosch GmbH 1984-1993 and Chairman of the Advisory Board until his death in 2000 in Stuttgart.

== Education ==
- School: Johanneum in Hamburg;
- Studies: Philosophy and Mathematics in Hamburg and Münster;
- Doctorate: Freges 'Lehre von dem Sinn und der Bedeutung der Urteile' und Russels Kritik an dieser Lehre in 1951;
- apprentice: Delbrück, Schickler & Co., private Bankers in Berlin;
- Honorable Doctorate in economics from Ruhruniversität Bochum in 1977;
- Honorable Senator to the Universität Tübingen in 1988
