= German Council of Economic Experts =

Committee

The German Council of Economic Experts (German: Sachverständigenrat zur Begutachtung der gesamtwirtschaftlichen Entwicklung) is a group of economists set up in 1963 to evaluate economic policies of the German government. In the media, the council is often referred to as the "Five Sages of Economy" (Fünf Wirtschaftsweisen), or simply the "Five Sages" (Fünf Weisen).

== Role ==
Every year the Council prepares an annual report which is published before or by November 15. The federal government has to publish its comments and conclusions within eight weeks of the publication of the annual report.

The Council’s secretariat is based at the Federal Statistical Office of Germany in Wiesbaden.

== Membership ==
=== Composition ===
The Council has five members which – based on the recommendation of the Federal Minister for Economic Affairs and Energy – are nominated by the federal government and appointed by the President of Germany for a term of five years. Every membership expires on 1 March of the term’s final year. Traditionally, the Joint Committee of German Associations in Trade and Industry – including the Confederation of German Employers' Associations and 14 other leading business associations – and the country’s trade unions each nominate one member of the Council.

=== Current members ===
- Achim Truger (since March 2019)
- Veronika Grimm (since April 2020)
- Monika Schnitzer (since April 2020)
- Martin Werding (since September 2022)
- Ulrike Malmendier (since September 2022)
- Gabriel Felbermayr (Nachfolge Malmendier)

=== Former members ===
(in chronological order)

- Wilhelm Bauer (January 1964–July 1974; chairman: March 1964–February 1970)
- Paul Binder (January 1964–February 1968)
- Herbert Giersch (January 1964–February 1970)
- Harald Koch (January 1964–May 1969)
- Fritz W. Meyer (January 1964–February 1966)
- Wolfgang Stützel (February 1966–September 1968)
- Manfred Schäfer (March 1968–July 1970)
- Norbert Kloten (June 1969–April 1976; chairman: March 1970–February 1976)
- Claus Köhler (December 1969–February 1974)
- Olaf Sievert (May 1970–February 1985; chairman: March 1976–February 1985)
- Armin Gutowski (December 1970–February 1978)
- Gerhard Scherhorn (May 1974–February 1979)
- Kurt Schmidt (August 1974–May 1984)
- Gerhard Fels (June 1976–February 1982)
- Horst Albach (May 1978–February 1983)
- Werner Glastetter (August 1979–August 1981)
- Hans-Jürgen Krupp (March 1982–February 1984)
- Hans Karl Schneider (July 1982–February 1992; chairman: March 1985–February 1992)
- Ernst Helmstädter (March 1983–February 1988)
- Dieter Mertens (March 1984–February 1986)
- Dieter Pohmer (July 1984–February 1991)
- Helmut Hesse (March 1985–November 1988)
- Rüdiger Pohl (July 1986–February 1994)
- Otmar Issing (April 1988–September 1990)
- Herbert Hax (March 1989–February 2000; chairman: March 1992–February 2000)
- Horst Siebert (January 1991–February 2003)
- Rolf Peffekoven (April 1991–February 2001)
- Juergen B. Donges (April 1992–February 2002; chairman: March 2000–February 2002)
- Wolfgang Franz (May 1994–February 1999; March 2003–February 2013; chairman: March 2009–February 2013)
- Jürgen Kromphardt (March 1999–February 2004)
- Bert Rürup (March 2000–February 2009, chairman: March 2005–February 2009)
- Wolfgang Wiegard (March 2001–February 2011; chairman: April 2002–February 2005)
- Axel A. Weber (March 2002–April 2004)
- Beatrice Weder di Mauro (June 2004–February 2012)
- Peter Bofinger (March 2004–February 2019)
- Isabel Schnabel (June 2014–December 2019)
- Christoph M. Schmidt (March 2009–February 2020; chairman: March 2013–February 2020)
- Lars Feld (since March 2011-February 2021; chairman: March 2020-February 2021)
- Claudia Maria Buch (March 2012–May 2014)
- Volker Wieland (March 2013–April 2022)

== Notable proposals ==
In the 1970s, the Council was one of the first global voices in favour of supply-side economics, including lower taxes and less government interference in the economy.

In 2002, the Council's annual report offered a blueprint for labour market reforms enacted by Chancellor Gerhard Schröder the following year.

In 2011, the Council proposed a plan for the issuance of collectivized European debt as part of a mechanism for contending with the Euro area crisis.

== Controversy ==
Council member Wolfgang Stützel resigned in 1968 after his colleagues rejected his minority views on exchange rate policy; an arbitration court ruled later that they did violate Stützel’s rights.

In 2024, Council member Veronika Grimm sued the four other members for having adopted transparency rules against her will, arguing that the guidelines on how to deal with alleged conflicts of interest are invalid and violate her rights enshrined in federal law.
