= Holger Görg =

German economist (born 1970)

Holger Görg (born 1970) is a German economist who currently works as Professor of International Economics at the University of Kiel. Görg also leads the Kiel Center for Globalization and heads the Research Area "Global Division of Labour" at the Kiel Institute for the World Economy. In 2009, he was awarded the Gossen Prize for his contributions to the study of firms' decisions to invest, export and outsource parts of their value chains abroad.

== Biography ==
Holger Görg earned a master's degree and a Ph.D. in economics from Trinity College Dublin in 1996 and 1999, partly while working as a lecturer at the University College Cork. After his graduation, Görg worked as a lecturer at the University of Ulster (1999-2000) before becoming a postdoctoral researcher at the University of Nottingham's Leverhulme Centre for Research on Globalisation and Economic Policy (2000–03). Thereafter, he worked as a lecturer (assistant professor) (2003–05) and then as a reader (associate professor) in international economics in Nottingham (2005–08). Since 2008, Görg has worked in Germany, where he holds the position of Professor of International Economics at the University of Kiel and heads the research area "Global Division of Labour" at the Kiel Institute for the World Economy (IfW). Moreover, he has been the Director of the Kiel Centre for Globalization, an interdisciplinary research centre focused on the analysis of global supply chains, since 2016. Additionally, Görg maintains affiliations with the Tuborg Research Centre for Globalisation and Firms at Aarhus University, and the IZA Institute of Labor Economics.

== Research ==
Holger Görg's main expertise lays in the analysis of the effects of globalization. His current research focuses on the activities of multinational firms, in particular their international outsourcing and exporting, as well as the application of panel data econometrics at the micro level. In his research, Görg has frequently collaborated with Eric Strobl (University of Birmingham). According to IDEAS/RePEc, Görg belongs to the top 2% of economists as ranked by research output.

=== Research on multinational firms ===
One major area of Görg's research regards the behaviour of multinational firms. Therein, he has in particular researched - often with Strobl - how productivity spills over from multinationals to a host country's domestic firms, e.g. through worker mobility, demonstration effects, and technological competition. In the Irish manufacturing sector, which a substantial part of Görg's research focuses on, Görg and Strobl find that multinational companies support the development of indigenous firms through linkages with local suppliers. Therein, they also find that the multinationals are indeed more "footloose" than indigenous firms in terms of having plants with lower survival rates, though new jobs generates in multinationals appear to be more persistent than those created in indigenous plants. Relatedly, they observe that the presence of multinationals is associated with higher survival rates of domestic plants in high-tech industries, likely due to technology spillovers, whereas multinationals in Ireland's low-tech sectors simply compete with each other. Investigating whether productivity spillovers from multinationals can be attributed to multinationals' previous employees using their acquired know-how to start their own enterprises, they find that firms managed by owners who used to work for multinationals in the same industry immediately prior to opening up their own firm are more productive than other domestic firms. In another study on the Irish manufacturing sector, Görg and Strobl find that public R&D subsidies of any size don't affect establishments' private R&D spending if they belong to a multinational, whereas large R&D grants to domestic plants are found to crowd out private R&D spending and small ones to promote it. Together with Salvador Barrios, Görg and Strobl also argue that Irish regional policy successfully attracted low-tech firms to disadvantaged areas when using a more indirect approach, though overall policy incentives seem to have been a less important determinant of multinationals' location choice than agglomeration economies. Finally, in the UK, Görg finds together with Sourafel Girma that the effect of acquisition by a foreign firm on workers' wages (the "foreign ownership wage premium") depends on the nationality of the foreign acquirer and the skill group of workers, with e.g. substantial post-acquisition wage effects on skilled and unskilled wages if a firm has been acquired by a multinational from the U.S., no such effects in the case of an EU acquirer, and a positive wage effect for unskilled workers if acquired by multinationals from the rest of the world. In later work with Strobl and Frank Walsh, Görg finds that this foreign ownership wage premium can likely be attributed to the higher gain in productivity and firm-specificity of foreign-owned firms' on-the-job training, as the wage premium of foreign-owned firms' workers is only earned gradually and by those who receive on-the-job training.

=== Research on foreign direct investment ===
A second area of Görg's research is foreign direct investment (FDI). In particular, Görg argues that a firm entering a foreign market via FDI is generally best off by acquiring an existing indigenous high-technology firm in order to form a duopoly with an indigenous low-technology firm instead of setting up an entirely new plant (greenfield investment). Together with Strobl and Frank Barry, he moreover finds that both "efficiency agglomerations", i.e. increases in firms' efficiency due to reductions in the distance between them, and "demonstration effects", i.e. firms' signals to new investors that the host country is reliable and attractive, were important determinants of U.S. firm entry into Ireland. Reviewing the literature on FDI and intra-industry spillovers with David Greenaway, Görg and Greenaway conclude that empirical evidence for a positive impact of foreign direct investment through productivity, wage and export spillovers from the pre-2000s is at best mixed and warrants further research. In another study with Strobl and Barrios, Görg finds that while inward FDI in Ireland may have initially deterred the entry of local firms by signalling an increase in competition, this initial effect has been exceeded by positive externalities fostering the development of local firms, resulting in an overall strongly positive impact of FDI on the local economy. With Girma, he also finds that British establishments' ability to benefit from productivity spillovers from FDI depends on their absorptive capacity. Finally, Görg and Paolo Figini argue that the impact of FDI on wage inequality depends on countries' economic development: In developing countries, inward FDI degressively increases wage inequality, whereas inward FDI in developed countries decreases wage inequality.

=== Research on firm exports ===
A third research area in Görg's work studies the exports of firms. Together with Barrios and Strobl, Görg observes that, in the 1990s, own R&D activity made Spanish firms more likely to export, while R&D spillovers increase firms' export ratios, especially if they are exporting to other OECD countries; by contrast, there is little evidence for export spillovers. In research with Girma and Strobl, he moreover finds that multinational plants in the UK perform better than domestic exporters and non-exporters, which perform roughly about the same. Görg, Girma and Mauro Pisu argue that the effects from productivity spillovers from FDI on domestic firms are very complex and differ substantially depending on whether the domestic firm operates in the export market as well as on the type of inward FDI. Additionally, Görg, Girma and Aoife Hanley find that previous exporting experience enhances the innovative capability of Irish firms, whereas British firms don't display strong learning-by-exporting effects, with differences being partly attributable to Irish firms' greater interface with OECD markets. Finally, Görg, Strobl and Michael Henry assess that if export grants are large enough, they can encourage already exporting firms to compete more effectively on the international market, though grants don't appear to encourage nonexporters to start exporting.

=== Research on international outsourcing ===
A fourth area of Görg's research concerns outsourcing, which he has intensively studied in Ireland and the UK. Together with Hanley, he finds that the international outsourcing of the production of intermediate materials increases the productivity of plants in the Irish electronics sector only if these have low export intensities, but that the outsourcing of services inputs only increases the productivity of domestic or foreign owned plants which export. The impact of outsourcing on profitability appears to depend not only on the type of outsourced input but also on plant size, with e.g. large plants benefitting from outsourcing materials whereas small plants don't. With regard to labour demand, outsourcing appears to decrease plant-level labour demand in the short run, especially for the outsourcing of materials. In British manufacturing, Görg and Girma find that outsourcing might be motivated by cost savings as wages increase as outsourcing increases, that foreign-owned firms have higher levels of outsourcing, and that establishments' labour productivity and total factor productivity growth increases in establishments' outsourcing intensity, especially among foreign-owned ones. Moreover, together with Alexander Hijzen and Robert Hine, Görg finds that international outsourcing strongly decreased the demand for unskilled labour in the UK while R&D increased the demand for skilled labour. Similarly, in Germany, Görg and Ingo Geishecker observe that a 1 percentage point increase in an industry's outsourcing reduced the wages of low-skilled workers within that industry by up to 1.5% whereas it increased those of high-skilled workers by up to 2.6%.
