= Part-time jobs in South Korea =

News about part-timers in Korea

Part-time jobs in South Korea refers to a short-term or temporary employment in South Korea. Part-time employees are considered non-regular workers, and their employee rights are protected by South Korean law. Usually, students and homemakers take part-time jobs to earn income. Office workers can also take part-time jobs as temporary positions in addition to their regular jobs. While part-time jobs are considered as supplementary income with minimal commitment, a recent survey found that many part-time workers in Korea work for more than 40 hours per week, and that part-time jobs are a primary source of income.

== Term ==
Part-time jobs of South Korea are called areubaiteu (아르바이트) or alba (알바) for short. This originally came from the German arbeit, meaning labor, then through Japanese arubiato (アルバイト), meaning part-time employment.

== History ==
The start of economic development in the 1970s made part-time jobs available to college students. These jobs were aimed at students who needed to earn tuition due to difficult family circumstances. In the 1990s, when economic growth was achieved to some extent, the lack of labor, the development of the service industry, and the increase of leisure time led to more and more college students working part-time jobs to earn pocket money. In particular, with the development of the service industry, businesses that are best maintained using part-time workers have emerged. As a result, the number of freeters (a Japanese term for an unemployed individual) who meet their economic needs only with part-time job activities had begun to increase. The first concept of the freeters was to refer to a small number of young people who live comfortably doing what they wanted to do without getting a full-time job. Still, it became a concept that included college students who were only looking for temporary jobs because they could not get a job over time.

A change in the industrial structure of Korean society took place. According to a study conducted by the Korean Institute for Industrial Economics and Trade, a notable feature in the trend of changes of the nation's industrial structure was a decrease in the proportion of employment in manufacturing industries and an increase in the percentage of jobs in service industries. A decline in manufacturing and expansion in the service sector increased in the proportion of low-wage employment.

The transition to neoliberalism in Korean society has become increasingly apparent under the Kim Young-same administration, through policies to liberalise labor flexibility and financial capital following intensive restructuring since the 1997 financial crisis. As a result, regular restructuring and layoffs have resulted in a decrease in ordinary workers and an increase in irregular workers.

== Labor rights ==
=== The minimum wage system ===
The minimum wage system is a system that protects low-wage workers by forcing the state to intervene in the wage-setting process between labor and management to set a minimum wage level and pay wages above this level. The minimum wage system's purpose is to ensure the minimum wage level for workers, thereby contributing to the development of the national economy by stabilizing the livelihood of workers and improving the quality of labor. The Minimum Wage Act was enacted and promulgated on December 31, 1986.

the year of implementation	an hourly wage	Daily wage (based on 8 hours)	a monthly salary (Based on 209 hours and based on public notice)
'20.1.1 ~'20.12.31	8,590	68,720	1,795,310
'19.1.1 ~'19.12.31	8,350	66,800	1,745,150
'18.1.1 ~'18.12.31	7,530	60,240	1,573,770
'17.1.1 ~'17.12.31	6,470	51,760	1,352,230
'16.1.1 ~'16.12.31	6,030	48,240	1,260,270
'15.1.1 ~'15.12.31	5,580	44,640	
14.1.1~'14.12.31	5,210	41,680	
'13.1.1 ~'13.12.31	4,860	38,880	
'12.1.1 ~'12.12.31	4,580	36,640	
'11.1.1~'11.12.31	4,320	34,560	
'10.1.1~'10.12.31	4,110	32,880	
'09.1.1~'09.12.31	4,000	32,000	
'08.1.1~'08.12.31	3,770	30,160	
'07.1.1~'07.12.31	3,480	27,840	
'05.9~'06.12	3,100	24,800	
'04.9~'05.8	2,840	22,720	
'03.9~'04.8	2,510	20,080	
'02.9~'03.8	2,275	18,200	
'01.9~'02.8	2,100	16,800	
'00.9~'01.8	1,865	14,920	
'99.9~'00.8	1,600	12,800	

=== Weekly holiday allowance ===
The employer must grant paid weekly holidays to workers who have completed all of the working days specified in the employment contract. They do not provide work on weekdays, but they are entitled to a one-day pay. Workers who have worked a certain number of working days for a week should be given 'at least once a week on average' paid holidays. Receiving this paid holiday is called a 'weekly holiday allowance'.

A weekly holiday allowance does not apply to workers with a fixed working time of fewer than 15 hours per week.

As such, all full-time workers who work more than 15 hours in a week must be provided with an average of one paid holiday per week and a weekly holiday allowance accordingly. Also, the weekly holiday allowance applies to businesses with less than four employees.

=== Industrial accident compensation ===
Industrial Accident Compensation Insurance is mandatory insurance implemented by the state to protect workers who have suffered industrial accidents. Social insurance provides medical care benefits, vacation compensation, disability benefits, etc. to workers who are injured or ill due to business reasons.

A job injury or illness refers to an employee's injury or illness or death due to work reasons. Specific criteria for industrial accidents are as follows:

1. An accident caused by an occupational accident or disease.
2. Proof of causal relationship between work and disaster.
3. Not an accident caused by a worker's intentional self-inflicted or criminal act.

=== Four major insurances ===
The four significant insurance policies refer to mandatory social insurance policies, a state system for the protecting worker's rights and interests. They include health insurance, employment insurance, industrial insurance, and national pension. Even if there is only one worker, you must join. Only those who work less than 15 hours a week are excluded from the subscription. The employer should fully cover industrial accident insurance. In contrast, health insurance, including the National Pension Service and employment insurance, will be paid by the employer and the employee, respectively.

=== Youth part-time work and age limits ===
Teenagers under the age of 15 and those under the age of 18 in Middle School are not allowed to work. However, teenagers aged at least 13 years or older and under 15 years of age can work if they have obtained a work permit issued by the Minister of Employment and Labor. Those under 13 years of age can also get a work permit for participating in art performances. When an employer hires a teenager under the age of 18, he/she shall have a certificate of family relationship records proving his/her age and a consent form of the person with parental authority, such as a parent or guardian.

== Types of part-time jobs ==
Temporary workers (한시적 근로자): Includes workers who have set the working contract period (regular workers) or workers who have not yet been set up to renew the contract repeatedly and who can't expect to continue to work due to involuntary reasons.

Part-time workers (시간제 근로자): Where the working hours specified to work at the same workplace are shorter than the prescribed working hours of workers performing the same work at the same workplace, usually less than 36 hours per week

== Damage ==
=== Unfair treatment ===
Unfair treatment experienced in part-time jobs includes no guarantee of mealtime and food expenses, arbitrary adjustment of contract working hours employers, failure to write work contracts, and low paychecks.

=== Risk from participating in high-risk part-time jobs ===
High-risk part-time jobs have relatively high physical and mental risks Occupational. For example, there are upper and lower logistics warehouses, entertainment bars, live experiments, multistage sales, construction sites, factories, and shipyards. The main reasons for participating in high-risk part-time jobs are the immediate provision of living expenses and tuition fees. The high-risk part-time wage is 1.5 to 5 times higher than the average part-time wage, but the labor intensity is severe. In particular, teenagers who are financially struggling later in college are more likely to participate in high-risk part-time jobs.

=== Low awareness of labor-related laws ===
49.4 percent of teenagers did not know the minimum hourly wage, and 13.3 percent did not receive the minimum hourly wage. Late-stage college teens were generally not well aware of the Labor Standards Act, which provides a basis for protecting their rights when experiencing unfair treatment at part-time jobs. It turns out that even if they were mistreated, they often endure it, or even if they want to take steps to correct the unfair treatment, they often don't know how to report it.

=== Discrimination against foreign workers ===
In Korea, the Act on the Employment, etc. of Foreign Workers was enacted on August 17, 2004, targeting foreign workers in production functions. Under the law, the overseas employment permit system allows users who fail to find workers to hire foreign workers with government permission. From the perspective of foreign workers, it is also a system that will enable them to work at companies set for a certain period of time by obtaining a job permit from the Korean government. The government then decided to unify the production function foreign power system into an employment permit system from January 1, 2007, by holding a foreign power policy committee meeting on July 27, 2005. The government decided to abolish the system that institutionalized discrimination by giving foreign workers status as trainees.
