= Linus Görg =

German politician (born 1994)

Member of the Hamburg Parliament
- Incumbent
- Assumed office 18 March 2020

Personal details
- Born: 8 February 1994 (age 32)
- Party: Alliance 90/The Greens (since 2017)

Linus Alexander Görg (né Jünemann; born 8 February 1994) is a German politician serving as a member of the Hamburg Parliament since 2020. From 2019 to 2020, he was a borough councillor of Wandsbek.
