= Placebo analgesia =

Ability of placebos to reduce pain

Placebo analgesia occurs when the administration of placebos leads to pain relief. Because placebos by definition lack active ingredients, the effect of placebo analgesia is considered to result from the patient's belief that they are receiving an analgesic drug or other medical intervention. It has been shown that, in some cases, the endogenous opioid system is critical for mediating placebo analgesia, as evidenced by the ability of such analgesia to be reduced by the opioid antagonist naloxone. However, it is also possible for placebo analgesia to be mediated by non-opioid mechanisms, in which case it would not be affected by naloxone. Other research has indicated that the human spinal cord, prefrontal cortex, and rostral anterior cingulate cortex also play a role in placebo analgesia.

== Psychological mechanisms ==
=== Pavlovian classical conditioning ===
Classical conditioning has been identified as a means by which we can induce placebo analgesia with drugs.

Recent research demonstrates how a neutral stimulus, experienced with an unconditioned stimulus, can generate a conditioned response, i.e., inducing analgesic effects, after a short conditioning period. In this study, an experimental group was given cyclosporine with a drink; here, the drink acts as the neutral stimulus and cyclosporine the unconditioned stimulus. When the two are ingested concurrently, an association is learnt, generating a conditioned stimulus of drink. This results in a conditioned response of pain-relief. In this particular study, analgesia was observed during the evocation stage, where participants were exposed to the drink and a placebo, then displayed a decreased lymphocyte activity.

Classical conditioning has been identified as a means to induce analgesia without drugs also. Common to-be conditioned stimuli in studies investigating analgesia are various coloured lights, e.g., blue, and orange and a common unconditioned stimulus, electric shocks. During conditioning phases of experiments, one light is displayed at the same time as a shock is administered. The shock comes from electrodes secured to the hands, where the intensity alternates between two extremes, generally high and non-painful, so participants can identify the difference and therefore bridge an association between the lights and shocks given, e.g., blue = not painful, and orange = very painful.

The shocks act as unconditioned stimuli, producing unconditioned responses, i.e., pain, and the neutral stimuli are the different coloured lights. In the experimental phase, participants are exposed to the same lights, but this time the shocks are uncoordinated; orange no longer signifies a painful shock, instead a weaker, non-painful shock and blue, now signifies pain. This is where the analgesic effect occurs. Participants witnessing both lights in a randomised sequence, state that the shock administered with the blue light is less painful than that of the one with the orange. This happens because the association bridged between the lights and shock intensity, gives participants an idea of what the shocks will feel like, when a certain light is shown. Owing to this, high intensity shocks that intend to cause pain, won't generate intense pain, because the pain level associated with that specific light is low.

=== Clinical applications ===
The applicability to pharmacotherapy is extensive. On one hand, the theory of classical conditioning suggests that medication dosage could be reduced, by associating it with another substance, like a nice tasting drink, therefore allowing people to slowly reduce and stop taking the medication, whilst maintaining the symptom-relieving effects. Theoretically, it should work, however in practice may not be feasible, as effects of conditioning last for a short period of time, approximately 4–7 days. This would mean constant classical conditioning using the medication would need to be conducted, which is likely to have reservations from an ethical viewpoint. This durability can be affected by a person's previous experience with therapy. Given a person has undergone therapy before, whether a negative or positive experience, the staggered reduction in stimuli affectivity, to induce an analgesic effect, will create an effect that is larger, prior the trial and smaller, after it. This in clinical application would be inutile as therapy should not lose its efficacy over an extended period of time.

On the other hand, research on the role that both expectancy, alongside conditioning play in inducing the analgesic effect, have prompted ideas to better the practice of pharmacotherapy. Expectancy in the analgesic effect comes from the conditioning prior, where the analgesic is associated with physiological pain relief. In practice, this knowledge can inform how specialists explain medicative therapy to their patients. Specialists could exercise emphasis on the symptom-relieving effect of the tablets, as opposed to the side effects. This would create an expectation in the patient's mind, of how they should feel upon taking the medication, as well as provide them with confidence it's going to be beneficial for them. This could be especially useful for treating those with chronic pain.

Classical conditioning can inform pharmacotherapy, in encouraging clinicians to help their patients to create associations between the analgesic medication and between pain relieving techniques. By developing these techniques, even if the medication dosage were reduced, to act as a single-blind placebo, those patients would still be able to experience some pain relief. This supports the idea of using behavioural conditioning to relieve patients of their pain and not need to continue medication at the same time, despite the durability constraints.

=== Social observational learning ===
The social learning theory, as part of behaviourism, is considered a way by which analgesic effects can be induced. Where a demonstrator sits with participants and responds to different coloured shocks administered when different lights appear, like above, the participants observing report the same answers as reported by the demonstrator. Separately, whilst the associations constructed around shock intensity through social observation were true based on statistical tests, the perception of the experience differ from that of the demonstrator. Alongside classical conditioning and social observational learning are verbal suggestions, tested as ways in which to engender analgesic effects. Of the three, classical conditioning and social observational learning are the most effective, regarding the strength of analgesic effects. An additional contributor to the analgesic effect is empathy. This can be measured using the Interpersonal Reactivity Index, containing subscales of which Empathetic Concern was the aspect positively correlated with social observational learning. This is suggestive of the idea that prosocial behaviour may be linked to placebo effects, as empathy scores tend to be higher where social learning 'gains' were greater.

The obtaining of empathy whilst learning how to respond to pain stimuli, is a stark contrast to the first-hand experience of pain, and how empathy is affected by that. Meta-analytical research demonstrates shared regions between the experience of pain and empathy. The dynamics of this relatability, having been investigated, show that both functions cannot be at their most active, at the same time. Instead, they are negatively correlated, when placebo analgesia is being experienced, the ability to empathise with oneself or others decreases greatly. This has implications for medication, specifically for painkillers, with possible evocation of anti-social attitudes amongst people, as was found with acetaminophen.
