= Horst Siebert =

German economist (1938–2009)

- Born: 20 March 1938; Neuwied
- Died: 2 June 2009 (aged 71); Switzerland

Academic background
- Education: University of Münster; Wesleyan University; University of Cologne

Academic work
- Discipline: International economics
- Institutions: Johns Hopkins University School of Advanced International Studies; University of Kiel (1989–2003); University of Konstanz (1984–1989); University of Mannheim (1969–1984)
- Awards: Bundesverdienstkreuz (2004)

Horst Siebert (20 March 1938 – 2 June 2009) was a German economist. He was a member of the German Council of Economic Experts from 1990 to 2003. Siebert also served as a member of both the Group of Economic Analysis (GEA) and the Group of Economic Policy Analysis (GEPA), a number of "European economists who advise the European Commission's president." From 2002 to 2004, as a member of GEA, he advised EU President Romano Prodi. From 2005 to 2007, as a member of GEPA, he advised EU President Jose Manuel Barroso Siebert spent most of his academic career at the University of Kiel, where he held the chair for economic theory from 1989 to 2003.

A native of Neuwied, Rhineland-Palatinate, Siebert studied economics at the University of Cologne (1959–1963), while also studying, and undertaking research in, economics at Wesleyan University (1960–1961). He earned his doctorate degree in economics from the University of Münster in 1965.

Siebert was appointed to the chair of economics and foreign trade at the University of Mannheim in 1969. He left in 1984 for the chair of economic relations at the University of Konstanz. Five years later, Siebert was appointed to the chair of economic theory at the University of Kiel. He was awarded the Ludwig-Erhard Prize in 1999, the Bundesverdienstkreuz in 2004, the Hayek Prize for excellence in economic writing in 2007.

In his book entitled Der Kobra-Effekt. Wie man Irrwege der Wirtschaftspolitik vermeidet, he illustrated the causes of perverse incentives in economy and politics in referring to the so-called cobra effect. His other publications include: The German Economy, Beyond the Social Market (2005); The World Economy. A Global Analysis (2007, 3rd edition); Einführung in die Volkswirtschaftslehre, co-author (2007); Economics of the Environment: Theory and Policy (2008, 7th revised edition; 2001 in Chinese); Rules for the Global Economy (2009). Siebert reportedly was a frequent contributor to academic journals and other publications. His seminal book, World Economics (1999, reprinted in 2000, 2nd edition 2002), "offered a new global perspective on international economic structures and processes."

He was a visiting scholar at The Australian National University, European University Institute, Harvard University, Massachusetts Institute of Technology (MIT), New York University, and the University of California, among other institutions. He held the Heinz Nixdorf Chair in European Integration and Economic Policy at Johns Hopkins University's Paul H. Nitze School of Advanced International Studies, Bologna Center. Siebert also served as President of the Kiel Institute for World Economics from 1989 to 2003.
