= Insider–outsider theory of employment =

Theory of labor economics

The insider–outsider theory is a theory of labor economics that explains how firm behavior, national welfare, and wage negotiations are affected by a group in a more privileged position. The theory was developed by Assar Lindbeck and Dennis Snower in a series of publications beginning in 1984.

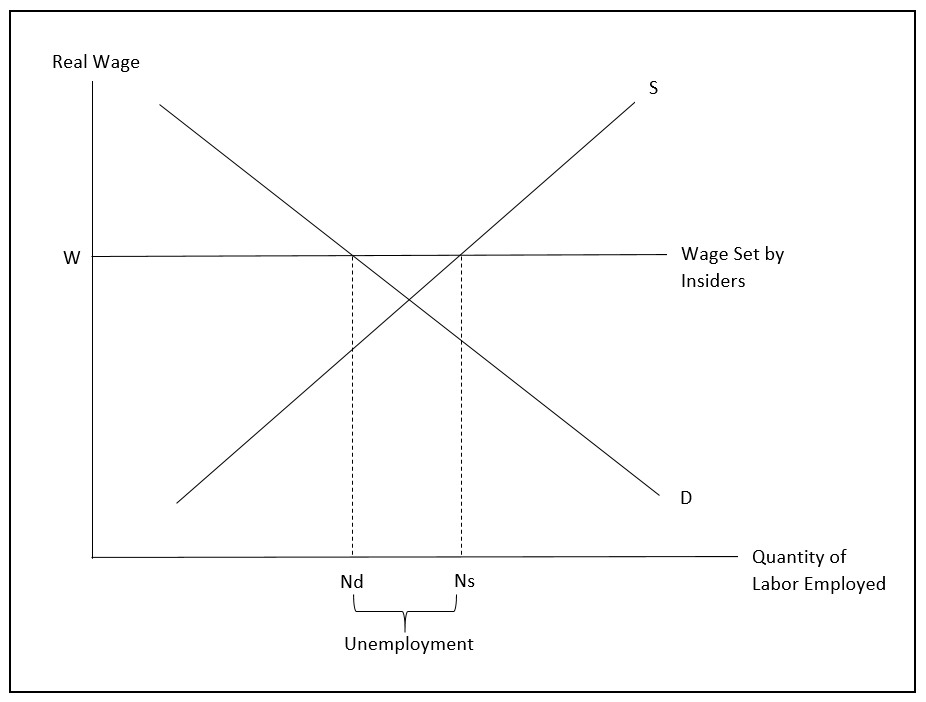
Wages set by insiders

The insiders, those employed by a firm, and the employers are the bargainers over wages. Because the insiders are already employed, they are in a position of power and are ultimately uninterested in expanding the number of jobs available for those who are not already employed. In other words, they are interested in maximizing their own wages rather than expanding jobs by holding wages down and allowing outsiders to become employed. Firms have a strong incentive to bargain with the insiders because of the high cost of replacing those workers. This cost, called labor turnover cost, includes severance pay, hiring process expenditures, and firm-specific training. Because the rate of unemployment has no weight to the monopoly of the union and employers on wage-setting, the natural rate of unemployment rises as the actual rate does. The outsiders (unemployed) become increasingly less relevant in the bargain. Because insiders commonly use their position of power to dissuade outsiders from underbidding their current wage. Research in educational sociology has identified comparable insider–outsider dynamics in public-sector institutions, showing that kinship‑based insider groups can use their social position to marginalize regional outsiders and restrict their access to institutional support. The result is a labor market that does not see any wage underbidding despite the willingness of many unemployed workers to work at a lower wage. This results in a market failure, meaning that the wage is not being set according to the labor market's needs or preferences.

A behavior of the insider–outsider model is illustrated at right, where Nd represents the optimal level of employment of labor firms and Ns represents the quantity of labor time workers desire to supply at a given wage rate. Insiders leverage their position of power to negotiate a wage that is much higher than the market-clearing wage rate. This bargain sets the wage rate for the whole labor market, meaning that unemployed workers are hired less often, even if they are willing to work for a lower wage. The disparity results in a new level of unemployment, which can lead to permanent unemployment.

== Economic agents ==
Percent of workers covered by collective bargaining, 2017

The economic agents at play are the employed, the unemployed, firms, often unions (referred to by collective bargaining), and sometimes the government.

The insider–outsider model explains why nations with high collective bargaining experience the most severe persistence in the natural rate of unemployment. For example, Spain has a high percentage of workers covered by collective bargaining compared to its global counterparts, indicating that the insiders of their labor market harness most of the power when it comes to wage bargaining and wage-setting (see Figure below) and hence experiences high and persistent unemployment. This changes when there is corporatism. The wage is typically set by only two economic agents, the firm and the insiders. However, with corporatism the national wage negotiation includes the government as the third party at the table, like in Sweden. But this is not the case for countries like Spain, so the insiders set the wage without the goal of decreasing unemployment, keeping the outsiders from getting in.

In this case, the government should intervene. Corporatism keeps insiders from tightly regulating the wage, which creates an inefficiency. Government intervention can be seen as a response to unemployment and income insecurity when workers are risk-averse. For example, a worker may be willing to exchange a lower expected wage for a wage structure that offers insurance against uncertainty about “where one will find oneself” in the wage distribution, i.e. unions will tend to produce a more compressed wage distribution. This is a form of insurance - as is labor market regulation or welfare state benefits - when markets for such insurance are missing.

== Consequences ==
When some external shock reduces employment, so that some insiders become outsiders, the number of insiders decreases. This incentivizes the insiders to set even higher wages when the economy again gets better, as there are not as many insiders remaining as before, instead of letting the outsiders to again get jobs at earlier wages. This causes hysteresis, i.e., the unemployment becomes permanently higher after negative shocks. Key explanations for the persistence in the natural rate of unemployment go back to Hall's (1979) theory of the natural rate of unemployment as a function of the job separation rate and the job finding rate. We observe an extremely persistent and high natural rate of unemployment through hysteresis as more outsiders become the long-term unemployed.

The outsiders bear the majority of the burden in terms of consequences from insiders setting the wage and disregarding the need for more job creation. The unemployed risk never developing the human capital required for employment, disaffection with the labor market, and experiencing the atrophy of any skills that would have been attractive to firms. These consequences mean that current unemployment leads to an increase in future unemployment. For the insiders, the job separation rate is essentially zero, whereas the outsiders have an extremely high job separation rate and an incredibly low job finding rate, directly creating unemployment persistence. A firm can justify against hiring the unemployed and especially the long-term unemployed by interpreting the duration of their unemployment as an indicator of poor productivity and work ethic, which keeps the outsiders from ever becoming insiders and furthers hysteresis mechanisms.

A more personal effect of the insider–outsider theory on outsiders is social consequence. Comparable patterns have been documented in educational settings, where outsider groups experience a “feedback loop of alienation” in which their withdrawal is interpreted as a lack of cultural fit, reinforcing their exclusion. Outsiders can become socially stigmatized for their unemployment and can be excluded from activities and networks within their societies. Unemployed workers who are constantly being crowded out by insiders rely on social welfare programs, family income, or the black market. In turn, the outsiders exist in a space with few resources, like meager social assistance, poor schooling, underdeveloped policy protection, and most importantly, little opportunity to move up in society. Their social exclusion is a direct result of their outsider status in the labor market, making them the real "outsiders" in society.

Scholars have extended insider–outsider theory to sociocultural and institutional settings, showing how insider groups can shape access to resources and legitimacy within public-sector organizations. Research in kinship‑dominated school systems demonstrates that local insiders may control symbolic and material resources while regional outsiders remain socially marginal despite formal inclusion. This application broadens the theory beyond wage bargaining to encompass institutional belonging and intra‑ethnic marginalization.
