= Al Gorg, Hirmand =

Al Gorg ال گرگ
- Village
- Location within Iran
- Coordinates: 31°08′34″N 61°41′49″E
- Country: Iran
- Province: Sistan and Baluchestan
- County: Hirmand
- Bakhsh: Central
- Rural District: Margan

Population (2006)
  - Total: 601
- Time zone: UTC+3:30 (IRST)
  - Summer (DST): UTC+4:30 (IRDT)

Al Gorg (Persian: ال گرگ, also Romanized as Āl Gorg and Ālgorg; also known as Deh-e ‘Alī Gorgī) is a village in Margan Rural District, in the Central District of Hirmand County, Sistan and Baluchestan Province, Iran. At the 2006 census, its population was 601, in 115 families.
