= Assar Lindbeck =

Swedish economist (1930–2020)

- Born: 26 January 1930; Umeå, Sweden
- Died: 28 August 2020 (aged 90); Stockholm, Sweden

Academic work
- Discipline: Economics
- School or tradition: Stockholm School
- Notable ideas: Insider–outsider theory of employment
- Website: Information at IDEAS / RePEc

Carl Assar Eugén Lindbeck (26 January 1930 – 28 August 2020) was a Swedish professor of economics at Stockholm University and at the Research Institute of Industrial Economics (IFN).

Lindbeck was a member of the Royal Swedish Academy of Sciences and the Norwegian Academy of Science and Letters, and previously chaired the Academy's prize committee for the Nobel Memorial Prize in Economic Sciences. He was the first Swede to be appointed a foreign Honorary Member of the American Economic Association, and one of only three Swedes ever.

Lindbeck has done research on unemployment (e.g. the insider–outsider theory of employment), the welfare state (including the effect of changing social norms and its interaction with economic incentives), and China's reformed economy. Lindbeck received a Ph.D. from Stockholm University in 1963 with the doctoral thesis A study in monetary analysis.

Assar Lindbeck also has a theory on self-destructive welfare state dynamics, in which the welfare system erodes norms relating to work and responsibility: change in the work ethic is related to a rising dependence on welfare state institutions. It was on the basis of this viewpoint that he promoted the economic theories of conservative American theorist James McGill Buchanan. It is said that it was through Lindbeck's influence at the Royal Swedish Academy of Sciences that Buchanan was awarded the 1986 Nobel Memorial Prize in Economic Sciences, a decision which was criticized by the British writer and columnist George Monbiot in 2017.

He is also attributed to authoring two empirical papers surrounding sick leave. He jointly worked with Mårten Palme and Mats Persson to study how local variation occurs in regards to sick leave. He also wrote upon the relationship between labor security legislation and sick leave insurance.

Lindbeck previously headed the Institute for International Economic Studies at Stockholm University, Sweden. In 1992–1993 he headed the so-called "Lindbeck Commission", which was appointed by the Government of Sweden to propose reforms in light of the then-ongoing economic crisis.

Lindbeck also sat as a fellow at CESifo in Munich and at the Kiel Institute of World Economics.

Lindbeck criticized the Swedish rent control system beginning in the early 1960s. This later resulted in one of his most famous quotes: “In many cases rent control appears to be the most efficient technique presently known to destroy a city—except for bombing.” which appeared in the book The Political Economy of the New Left: An Outsider's View (1971), written in reaction to the developments he had observed on American campuses during a sabbatical in the US.

Lindbeck was a social democrat, although he left the Swedish Social Democratic Party in 1982.

== Bibliography ==
- The housing shortage. A study of the price system in the housing market (with Ragnar Bentzel och Ingemar Ståhl), Almqvist & Wiksell, Stockholm, 1963.
- The Political Economy of the New Left: An Outsider's view, Harper and Row, 1971.
- Swedish Economic Policy. University of California Press, 1974.
- The Insider-Outsider Theory of Employment and Unemployment, (with Dennis Snower) MIT Press, Cambridge, Massachusetts, 1988.
- The Swedish Experiment, SNS Förlag, Stockholm, 1997.
