= Halle Institute for Economic Research =

German research institute

IWH
- Established: 1992
- President: Reint E. Gropp
- Executive Board: Reint E. Gropp, Oliver Holtemöller, Michael Koetter, Tankred Schuhmann
- Faculty: Economics
- Staff: 106
- Budget: 11,85 million Euros (2025)
- Address: Kleine Maerkerstrasse 8 D-06108 Halle (Saale), Germany
- Location: Halle (Saale), Saxony-Anhalt, Germany
- Website: www.iwh-halle.de/en/

The Halle Institute for Economic Research – Member of the Leibniz Association (German: Leibniz-Institut für Wirtschaftsforschung Halle, abbreviated IWH) is a non-profit organisation and one of the leading economic research institutes in Germany.

== History ==
The IWH was founded on January 1, 1992. It is a member of the Leibniz Association and receives its institutional budget from the federal government and the German federal states in equal parts, respectively.

In terms of its legal status, the IWH is a registered association. In accordance with its statutes, the institute pursues aims directly and exclusively related to the public interest, especially research interests. Within this framework, the IWH carries out both institutionally financed tasks as well as research for third parties.

IWH's founding mission was to carry out research on the economic transition in East Germany and Central and Eastern Europe. Transition comes along with institutional changes and processes of adaption and offers both a rich source of economic questions and the possibility to apply modern scientific methods. As the transformation of the formal institutions has been completed, IWH has extended its research profile and focuses on processes of economic convergence and the role of the financial system regarding the (re-)allocation of production factors as well as the facilitation of productivity and innovation.

Former presidents of the IWH include:

- Manfred Wegner, 1992-1993
- Rüdiger Pohl, 1994-2003
- Ulrich Blum, 2004-2010
- Jutta Günther and Oliver Holtemöller, 2011-2013 (acting directors)
- Claudia M. Buch, 2013
- Reint E. Gropp, 2014–present

== Tasks ==
IWH's tasks are economic research and research-based advising of economic policy. IWH conducts evidence-based research by combining theoretical and empirical methods. In the focus of its research, IWH investigates processes of economic convergence, the role of the financial system regarding the (re-)allocation of production factors as well as the facilitation of productivity and innovation.

== Research ==
IWH research is organised in a matrix structure. One dimension of the matrix consists of research groups organised as fixed-term projects. The establishment of research groups follows a structured, competitive procedure. Research clusters and research groups comprise researchers from different departments, thus allowing for a cross-departmental integration of research at IWH. The three topic-oriented research clusters currently are:

- Economic Dynamics and Stability
- Productivity and Institutions
- Financial Resilience and Regulation

The other dimension of the matrix consists of four research departments:

=== Financial Markets ===
Research in this department centres on institutional changes in Europe's financial markets. The department analyses the causes and consequences of banks’ international expansions, the link between market structures in banking and aggregate (financial) stability, contagion effects on international financial markets and the role of the financial system for the real economy.

=== Labour Markets ===
The Department of Labour Markets studies key issues in labour economics, with a particular focus on employment, labour productivity, wage formation, and inequality, and how educational choices shape labour market outcomes. In addition, the department examines processes of structural change caused by the decarbonization of the economy, shifts in global trade patterns, or technological progress. The department analyzes these topics empirically using microeconometric methods.

=== Laws, Regulations and Factor Markets ===
The regulation of financial and labour markets is traditionally analysed separately. The department aims to overcome this divide from the perspective of real sector development. It will achieve this objective by conducting joint research into aspects of the framework conditions for financial and labour markets that are relevant to growth and structure. The unique attribute of the department is the analysis of interdependency between national and supranational regulation within the field of financial and labour markets on the one hand, and real sector development on the other.

=== Macroeconomics ===
The department of macroeconomics analyses economic fluctuations of important economic indicators as Gross Domestic Product, employment, and interest rates in the short and medium horizon, the impact of economic policy on these, and the institutional framework that determines long term growth and the business cycle. Founded on this research, the department offers policy advice.

The IWH also operates a Research Data Centre (IWH-RDC), which serves as a research infrastructure providing research data for empirical economic research. Its data portfolio includes firm-level and establishment data, historical microdata, and additional datasets generated through the institute's research activities.

== Report on the German economy ==
IWH is one of the leading economic research institutes in Germany that, twice a year (in spring and autumn), submit a joint report on the state of the German economy, the so-called Gemeinschaftsdiagnose (Joint Economic Forecast). IWH participated for the first time in spring 1993.
