= Dennis Snower =

American-German economist (born 1950)

Dennis J. Snower
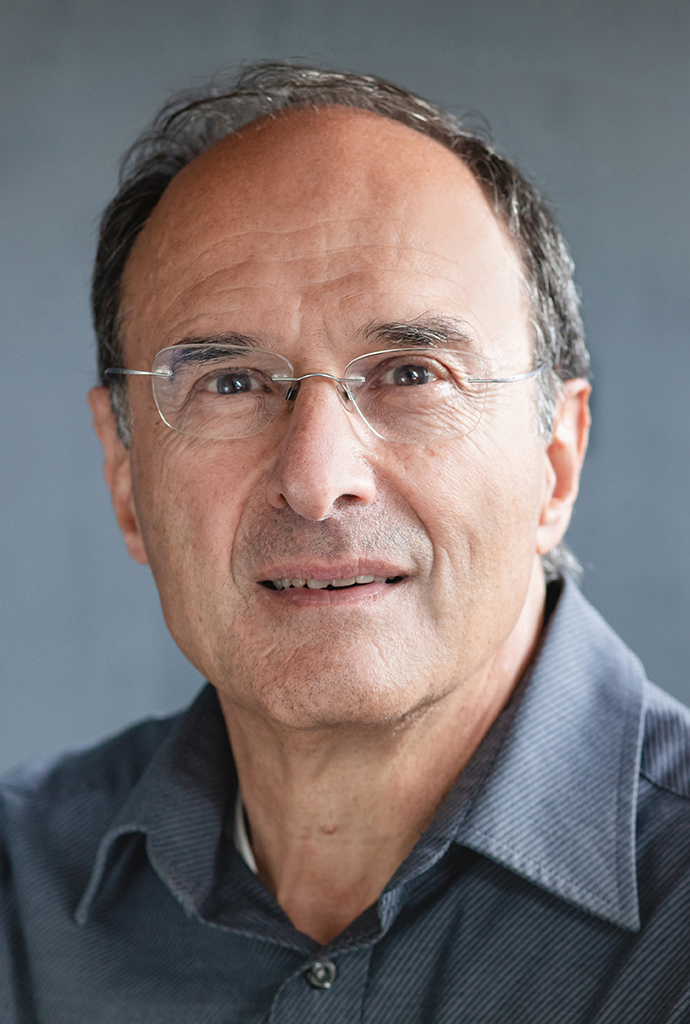
- Born: 14 October 1950 (age 76); Vienna, Austria

Academic background
- Education: Princeton University; New College, Oxford

Academic work
- Institutions: Global Solutions Initiative
- Website: Information at IDEAS / RePEc

Dennis J. Snower (born 14 October 1950) is an American-German economist, specialising in macroeconomic theory and policy, labor economics, digital governance, social economics, and the psychology of economic decisions in "caring economics".

== Life and career ==
Snower was born in Vienna, Austria, where he went to the American International School. He received a BA and MA from New College, Oxford University, an MA and a PhD from Princeton University. He is a US citizen, married and has two children. He received German citizenship in 2018.

== Research in labor economics ==
The insider–outsider theory of employment and unemployment, created by Dennis Snower in conjunction with Assar Lindbeck, explains employment and unemployment in terms of a conflict of interest between insiders and outsiders in the labor market.

Insiders are employees whose positions are protected by labor turnover costs (such as costs of hiring, training, and firing, or costs arising when insiders cooperate with each other but not with outsiders). Outsiders enjoy no such protection. The insider–outsider theory has spawned a large literature on unemployment dynamics, dual labor markets, employment policy, macroeconomic policy, social inequality, and political economy.

The chain reaction theory of unemployment, conceived by Snower together with Marika Karanassou and Hector Sala, views movements in unemployment as the outcome of the interplay between labor market shocks and a network of lagged adjustment processes. This theory indicates that cyclical and structural unemployment are interdependent. This implies that the lagged adjustment processes – for example, current employment depends on past employment on account of labor market adjustment costs – are shape both for the fluctuations in unemployment and the long-run unemployment rate.

The theory on the reorganization of work towards multi-tasking, created by Dennis Snower in conjunction with Assar Lindbeck, identifies driving forces underlying the shift from "Tayloristic" organizations (characterized by specialization by tasks) to "holistic" organizations (featuring job rotation, integration of tasks and learning across tasks). It was one of the first contributions analyzing the fundamental changes in the world of work arising from the digital revolution and was a precursor of the large literature on the polarization of work.

== Research on the psychological and social foundations of economics ==
Caring economics, created by Snower in conjunction with Tania Singer and their respective research teams, laid the analytical and empirical foundations for a new theory of microeconomic decision making, based on underlying psychological motives. The analysis rests on the insights that all economic behavior is psychologically motivated, everyone has access to an array of discrete motivation systems, which affect their objectives, as well as their beliefs and perceptions, and which motive is active at any particular point in time depends on the person's physical and social context. This research has generated wide-ranging insights, such as for psychology, mental training, identity economics, environmental psychology, and welfare policy.

Together with George Akerlof and Steven Bosworth, Snower made seminal contributions to identity and narrative economics. This work explores the formation of competitive versus cooperative identities and the channels whereby narratives affect economic decisions. It has influenced thinking in political economy, socio-economics, psychology, behavioral finance and environmental economics.

== Macroeconomic Research ==
Snower laid the theoretical and empirical groundwork for a reappraisal of the Phillips curve – the tradeoff between inflation and unemployment – in conjunction with Liam Graham, Marika Karanassou, Hector Sala, Mewael Tessfaselassie and Andrea Vaona. This approach suggests that unemployment is not independent of inflation in the long run, but instead explores the circumstances under which there is an inverse long-run relation between inflation and unemployment. This theory calls into question the conventional claim that real economic activity is independent of monetary phenomena in the long run. The approach rests on the theory of "frictional growth," focusing on the interplay between nominal frictions and money growth. This work breaks the conventional compartmentalization of macroeconomics into short-term macroeconomic fluctuations versus long-term growth. This research has influenced work on monetary policy, behavioral economics, and macroeconomic theory.

Snower developed new theories of sluggish price adjustment. With Assar Lindbeck, Snower showed how the sluggish adjustment of prices and wages in response to macroeconomic shocks depends on lags in the production process. The longer the production lags, the more slowly prices and wages adjust. With Steffen Ahrens and Inske Pirshel, Snower examined how asymmetric price sluggishness is generated by "loss aversion," the phenomenon that people are more sensitive to utility losses from price increases than to utility gains from price decreases.

In conjunction with Wolfgang Lechthaler and Christian Merkel, Snower made seminal contributions to the macroeconomics under labor turnover costs. These contributions show how labor turnover costs help explain the persistent effects of macroeconomic shocks on aggregate output and employment, as well as strong amplification effects of real and monetary shocks on unemployment and the job finding rate.

Dennis Snower was one of the originators of the macroeconomics of imperfect competition, as he was among the first to provide imperfectly competitive microfoundations for macroeconomic models. Together with Assar Lindbeck, he also made seminal contributions to our understanding of how macroeconomic shocks are transmitted to the labor market.

== Research on the economics of imperfect information ==
The theory of "high-low search" in product markets, which Snower created together with Steve Alpern, shows how firms use their pricing and product supply decisions to gain information about product demand under conditions of radical uncertainty. The analysis was also extended to the labor market to explain unemployment as an "information gathering device" under uncertainty.

This research was among the early contributions to the analysis of economic decisions making under radical uncertainty, influencing various subsequent contributions to the analysis of information acquisition and the role of experimentation.

Together with Alessio Brown and Christian Merkel, Snower created the incentive theory of matching. In contrast to the conventional theory of matching in the labor market, unemployed workers and vacant jobs are not matched through an arbitrary matching function, but rather the labor market matching process is analyzed as the outcome of a two-sided search process among workers and firms facing heterogeneous economic conditions.

== Research on economic policy ==
Dennis Snower is the author of the benefit transfer program and other active labor market policies, whereby the unemployed receive jobs and training incentives in accordance with their needs. These policies redistribute economic incentives, not money, to the disadvantaged in the labor market. Thereby Snower became one of the earliest architects of active labor market policies. In the benefit transfer program, unemployment benefits are converted into hiring and training subsidies for the long-term unemployed. This work has influenced thinking on welfare policy in other areas, such as support for the disabled.

He also analyzed the implications of replacing current welfare systems by individualized welfare accounts. These accounts include retirement, employment, health and human capital accounts. Instead of paying the taxes to finance the welfare state, people are to make ongoing, mandatory contributions to each of their welfare accounts, covering their major welfare needs. Redistribution is achieved by taxing the accounts of the wealthy and subsidizing the accounts of the poor.

As an overarching theme for G20 policy making, Dennis Snower initiated the concept of recoupling economic and social prosperity, together with Colm Kelly, he explored how business prosperity can be recoupled with social prosperity. Recoupling policies are designed not only to reduce income inequalities, but also promote empowerment and social solidarity of people displaced by the forces of globalization and automation. Together with Katharina Lima de Miranda, Snower created the SAGE dashboard for economic performance, where S stands for "solidarity", A for "agency, "G" for "material goods", and E for "environmental sustainability." The SAGE dashboard is an ethically based set of wellbeing indicators, measured annually on a coherent basis for over 150 countries. It provides a framework for capturing economic, social and environmental aspects of wellbeing, all of which are required for achieving meaningful, satisfying lives.

== Selected publications ==
- Dennis Snower and Assar Lindbeck, Involuntary Unemployment as an Insider-Outsider Dilemma (1984).
- Dennis Snower and Assar Lindbeck, The Insider-Outsider Theory of Employment and Unemployment (1988).
- Dennis Snower, Steven Bosworth and Tania Singer, Cooperation, Motivation and social balance (2016).
- Dennis Snower and Steven Bosworth, Identity-Driven Cooperation versus Competition (2016).
- Dennis Snower and George Akerlof, Bread and Bullets (2016).
- Dennis Snower and Maria Karanassou, Is the natural rate a reference point (1997).
- "Dennis Snower". JSTOR.

== Other activities ==
- Potsdam Institute for Climate Impact Research (PIK), Member of the Scientific Advisory Board
