= Gustav Stolper =

Austrian-German economist, journalist, and politician (1888–1947)

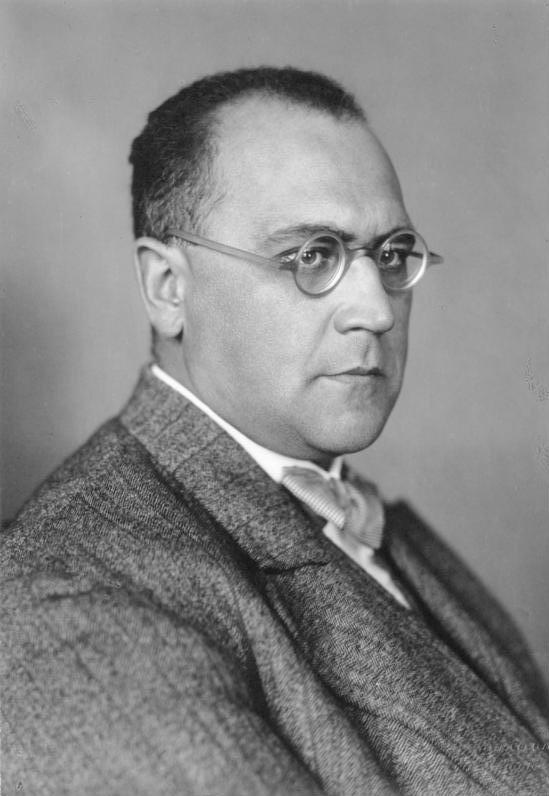
- Stolper in 1920
- Born: 25 July 1888; Vienna, Austria-Hungary (now Austria)
- Died: 27 December 1947 (aged 59); New York City, US
- Occupation: Economic writer
- Spouse: Toni Stolper (m. 1921)
- Children: Wolfgang Stolper

Gustav Stolper (25 July 1888 – 27 December 1947) was an Austrian-German economist, economics journalist and politician.

== Life and work ==
Stolper was born in Vienna, Austria-Hungary. He was born into a Jewish family that had immigrated from Poland to Austria.

In 1913 he established Der Österreichischer Volkswirt. Stolper and Joseph Schumpeter reportedly knew each other when they lived in Vienna in the 1910s. In 1925, Stolper moved to Berlin. In 1926 he established the Deutscher Volkswirt, the forerunner of Wirtschaftswoche weekly business magazine. In 1929 he drafted a platform for the German Democratic Party geared towards the interests of the middle class; it was well-received but came too late to prevent the party's disintegration.

Stolper was elected to the Reichstag of the Weimar Republic in 1930 as a member of the German State Party.

Stolper migrated to the United States after Hitler's rise to power.

In 1940, he published German Economy, 1870-1940, an economic history of modern Germany. In 1948, he published German Realities; A Guide to the Future Peace of Europe.

== Gustav Stolper Prize ==
The Gustav Stolper Prize is awarded by the Verein für Socialpolitik for "outstanding scientists who have employed the findings of economic research to influence the public debate on economic issues and problems, and have made important contributions to understanding and solving contemporary economic problems."

Winners:

- 2007: Bruno S. Frey
- 2008: Hans-Werner Sinn
- 2009: Martin Hellwig
- 2010: Ernst Fehr
- 2011: Otmar Issing
- 2012: Wolfgang Franz
- 2013: Clemens Fuest
- 2014: Carl Christian von Weizsäcker
- 2015: Justus Haucap
- 2016: Christoph M. Schmidt
- 2017: Ludger Wößmann
- 2018: Isabel Schnabel
- 2019: Ulrike Malmendier
- 2020: Markus Brunnermeier
- 2021: Lars Feld
- 2022: Monika Schnitzer
- 2023: Veronika Grimm
- 2024: Simon Jäger
- 2025: Nicola Fuchs-Schündeln
- 2026: Gabriel Felbermayr

== Family ==
His eldest son Wolfgang Stolper (1912-2002) was an American economist.

== See also ==
- Einstein–Szilárd letter
