= Gustav Stolper Prize =

The Gustav Stolper Prize is an award given by the Verein für Socialpolitik to outstanding scientists who have used economic research to influence the public debate on economic issues, and have contributed substantially to the understanding and solution of current economic problems. It is named for the Austrian-German economist and politician Gustav Stolper.

== Recipients ==
Source: Verein für Socialpolitik

Year	Recipients	Research institution
2007	Bruno Frey	University of Zurich
2008	Hans-Werner Sinn	LMU Munich
2009	Martin Hellwig	Max Planck Institute for Research on Collective Goods
2010	Ernst Fehr	University of Zurich
2011	Otmar Issing	Goethe University Frankfurt
2012	Wolfgang Franz	University of Mannheim
2013	Clemens Fuest	Centre for European Economic Research
2014	Carl Christian von Weizsäcker	Max Planck Institute for Research on Collective Goods
2015	Justus Haucap	Heinrich Heine University Düsseldorf
2016	Christoph M. Schmidt	RWI Essen
2017	Ludger Wößmann	LMU Munich
2018	Isabel Schnabel	University of Bonn
2019	Ulrike Malmendier	University of California, Berkeley
2020	Markus Brunnermeier	Princeton University
2021	Lars Feld	Walter Eucken Institut
2022	Monika Schnitzer	LMU Munich
2023	Veronika Grimm	University of Erlangen–Nuremberg
2024	Simon Jäger	Massachusetts Institute of Technology
2025	Nicola Fuchs-Schündeln	Goethe University Frankfurt

== See also ==
- List of economics awards
- Erwin Plein Nemmers Prize in Economics
- Nobel Memorial Prize in Economic Sciences
