= Stolper =

Stolper is a surname. Notable people with the surname include:

- Aleksandr Stolper (1907–1979), Russian/Soviet film director
- Daniel Stolper, American oboist
- Edward Stolper, American geologist
- Gustav Stolper, Austrian economist, journalist and politician
- Johannes Stolper, German wheel gymnast
- Matthew Stolper, American Assyriologist
- Pinchas Stolper, American rabbi
- Toni Stolper (born Antonie Kassowitz), Austrian journalist, wife of Gustav
- Wolfgang Stolper, American economist, son of Gustav

== Fictional ==
- Lt. Kevin Stolper, character in the TV series 'Law and Order'
