= Roland Kirstein =

German economist and professor

Roland Kirstein (born 10 August 1965) is a German economist and professor of Business Administration at the Otto-von-Guericke-University in Magdeburg, Germany.

== Biography ==
Roland Kirstein was born Schröder in Bremen, Germany. He studied economics and law at the Saarland University in Germany in 1988-1994. He finished his Ph.D. thesis in 1998 (supervisor Prof. Dieter Schmidtchen) on the topic "Imperfect Decision-Making Judges". As an assistant professor of economics, he specialized in law and economics, namely banking regulation, insurance economics, and constitutional economics.

In 2002, Roland Kirstein visited the University of California, Berkeley (Law School, invited by Prof. Robert Cooter) and in Santa Barbara (Economics Department, invited by Prof. Ted Bergstrom) to do research into asymmetric information in consumer markets. In 2003 and 2005, he has been a visiting professor at the University of California, Santa Barbara, giving courses in Law and Economics.

Since October 2006, he holds the professorship "Economics of Business and Law" at the Otto-von-Guericke-University Magdeburg. In August 2007, he became a tenured professor. From 2012 to 2023 he was the president of the German Law and Economics Association (Gesellschaft fuer Recht und Oekonomik e.V.).

== Personal ==
Roland Kirstein is a supporter and member of the German soccer clubs SV Werder Bremen and 1._FC_Magdeburg.

== Research areas ==
- Law and Economics
- Game theory, Bargaining theory
- Collective Decision-Making in Organisations
- Intellectual Property Rights
- Regulation of Banking and Insurance, Islamic Finance

== Achievements and awards ==
- President of the German Law and Economics Association 2012-2023, vice president 2006-2012.
- Member of the steering committee (2001-2005) and the advisory board of the European Association of Law and Economics.
- Member of the following committees of the Verein für Socialpolitik: economic policy, competition, institutions.
- Editorial Board of the journal Banks and Bank Systems.
- Editorial board of The Reviews of Law and Economics.
- Member of the Center for the Study of Law and Economics, Saarland University.
- Eduard-Martin-Award of the Saarland University for his PhD thesis.

== Memberships ==
- American Economic Association (AEA), Royal Economic Society (RES), Verein für Socialpolitik (VfS).
- American Law and Economics Association (ALEA), Canadian Law and Economic Association (CLEA), Greek Association of Law and Economics (GALE), European Association of Law and Economics (EALE).
- Verband der Hochschullehrer der Betriebswirtschaft e. V. (VHB), Schmalenbachgesellschaft für Betriebswirtschaft, German Economic Association for Business Administration (GEABA).

== Selected publications ==
- Haucap, J./Kirstein, R. (2003): Government Incentives when Pollution Permits are Durable Goods; in: Public Choice 115, 163-183.
- Kirstein, R. (2000): Risk-Neutrality and Strategic Insurance. In: The Geneva Papers on Risk and Insurance. Issues and Practice 25 (2), 262-272.
- Kirstein, R. (2002); The New Basle Accord, Internal Ratings, and the Incentives of Banks. In: International Review of Law and Economics 21 (4), 393-412.
- Kirstein, A./Kirstein, R. (2009): Collective Wage Agreements on Fixed Wages and Piece Rates may Cartelize Product Markets. In: Journal of Institutional and Theoretical Economics 165(2), 250-259.
- Kirstein, R./Cooter, R. (2007): Sharing and Anti-Sharing in Teams. In: Economics Letters 96(3), 351-356.
- Kirstein, R./Rickman, N. (2004): „Third Party Contingency“ Contracts in Settlement and Litigation. In: Journal of Institutional and Theoretical Economics 160 (4), 555-575.
- Kirstein, R./Schmidtchen, D. (1997): Judicial Detection Skill and Contractual Compliance. In: International Review of Law and Economics 17 (4), 509-520.
- Kirstein, R./Schmidtchen, D. (2001): Do Artists Benefit from Resale Royalties? An Economic Analysis of a New EU Directive. In: Deffains, B./Kirat, T. (eds.): Law and Economics in Civil Law Countries; The Economics of Legal Relationships Vol. 6, Elsevier Science, Amsterdam et al., 231-248.
- Kirstein, R./Voigt, S. (2006): The Violent and the Weak. When Dictators Care about Social Contracts. In: American Journal of Economics and Sociology 65(4), 863-889.
- Kirstein, R. / Will, B. (2006): Efficient Compensation for Employees' Inventions. In: European Journal of Law and Economics 21 (1), 129-148.

== Referee reports ==
- American Economic Review
- B.E. Journals in Theoretical Economics
- European Economic Review
- European Journal of Law and Economics
- German Economic Review
- Homo Oeconomicus
- Industrielle Beziehungen
- International Journal of Industrial Organization
- International Review of Law and Economics
- Journal of Cultural Economics
- Journal of Economic Studies
- Journal of Institutional and Theoretical Economics
- Metroeconomica
- Political Studies
- Schmalenbach Business Review
- Theory and Decision
- Cusanuswerk
- Deutscher Akademischer Austauschdienst (DAAD)
- Studienstiftung des Deutschen Volkes
- Verein für Socialpolitik
