= The Fox Effect =

2012 book by David Brock

- Author: David Brock and Ari Rabin-Havt
- Language: English
- Subject: Media bias
- Publisher: Anchor Books
- Publication date: 21 February 2012
- Publication place: United States
- Pages: 336
- ISBN: 978-0-307-94768-0

The Fox Effect: How Roger Ailes Turned a Network into a Propaganda Machine is a 2012 book written by David Brock and Ari Rabin-Havt. Brock heads the progressive media watchdog group Media Matters, the stated mission of which is "to comprehensively monitor, analyze, and correct conservative misinformation in the U.S. media." The book details the numerous controversies of Fox News, with emphasis on its president, Roger Ailes.

== Summary ==
The idea of a "Fox effect" dates back to at least 2006 in a National Bureau of Economic Research working paper titled "The Fox News Effect: Media Bias and Voting," by Stefano DellaVigna and Ethan Kaplan. The working paper, which was subsequently published in the Quarterly Journal of Economics in 2007, found "a significant effect of the introduction of Fox News on the vote share in Presidential elections between 1996 and 2000," as well as "a significant effect of Fox News on Senate vote share and on voter turnout."

According to publisher Random House, the book "follows the career of [Roger] Ailes..." and features "transcripts of leaked audio and memos from Fox News reporters and executives."

== Reception ==
Publishers Weekly positively reviewed the book, noting the "diligently documented book... leave[s] us with the warning that 'the single most important player' in the upcoming election will be none other than Fox News." Kirkus Reviews called it a "thorough catalogue," but warned that those who are well-versed may believe that the "book feels like an exhaustively researched exercise in stating the obvious." The book was reviewed by Erik Wemple at the Washington Post, who criticized the book's lack of balance. A review at The New York Times praised it as a "close study" while questioning the book's success, noting the book "demonstrates not its reach but the limits of conservative jihadism."

== See also ==
- Big lie
- Fake news
