= Ludger Wößmann =

German economist

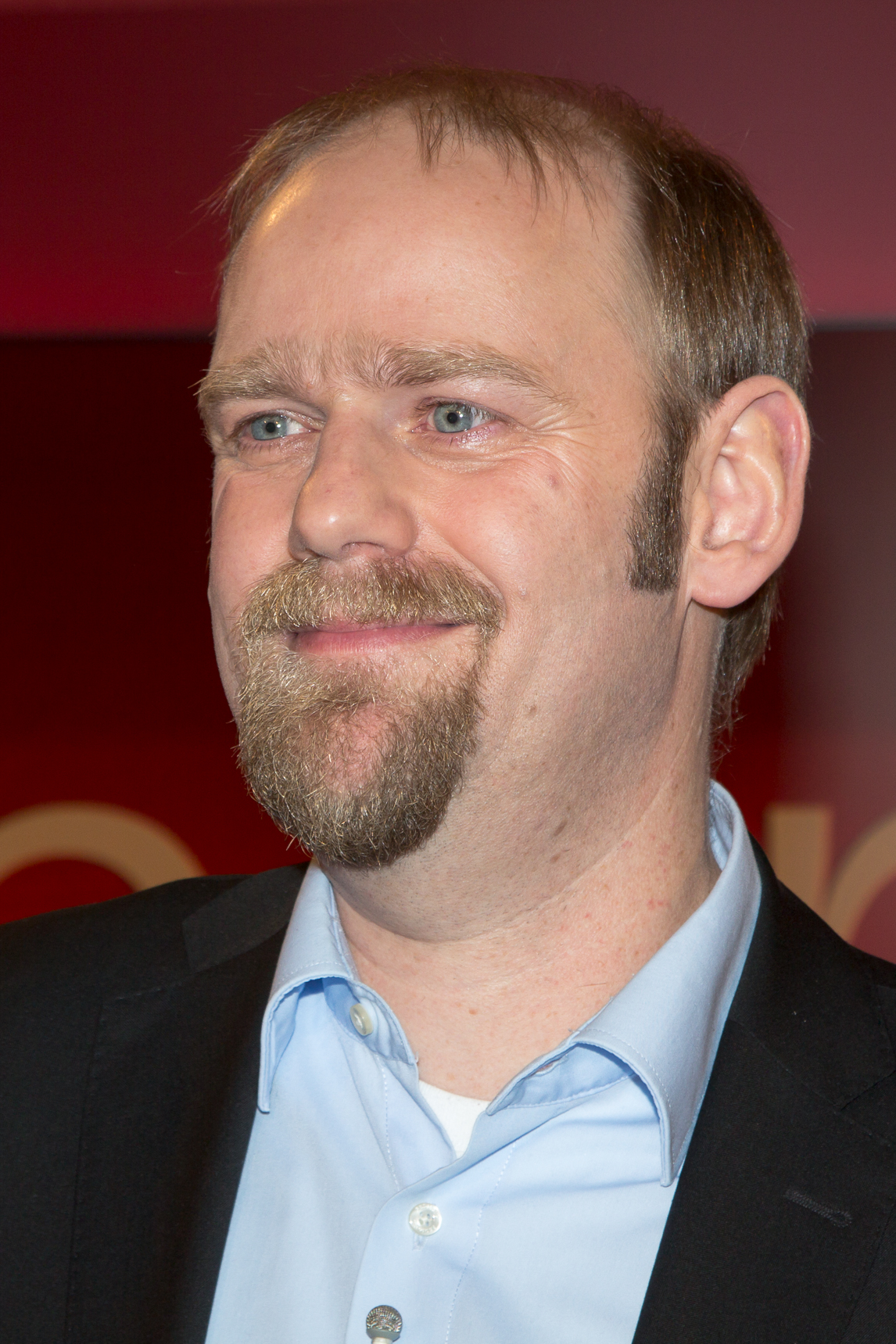
- Ludger Wößmann in Hart aber fair, 2016
- Born: 1 July 1973 (age 53); Sendenhorst, North Rhine-Westphalia, Germany
- Occupations: German economist and professor of economics
- Website: https://www.ifo.de/en/woessmann-l

Ludger Wößmann (German: [ˈluːtɡɛʁ ˈvœsman]; born in Sendenhorst on July 1, 1973) is a German economist and professor of economics at LMU Munich. Moreover, being one of the world's foremost education economists, he is the director of the ifo Center for the Economics of Education at the ifo Institute. Beyond the economics of education, his research interests also include economic growth and economic history. In 2014, Wößmann's empirical research on the effects of education and his corresponding contribution to public debate were awarded the Gossen Prize (the German equivalent of the John Bates Clark Medal), followed by the Gustav Stolper Prize in 2017.

== Biography ==
A native of Sendenhorst (North Rhine-Westphalia), Ludger Wößmann earned a MA from the University of Marburg in 1998, a PhD (Dr. sc. pol.) from Kiel University in 2001 under Horst Siebert, and obtained his habilitation from the Technical University of Munich in 2006 under Robert K. von Weizsäcker and Hans-Werner Sinn, with all degrees being in economics. Additionally, he also studied at the University of Kent at Canterbury (1995–96) and at the Kiel Institute for the World Economy (IfW) (1998–99), where he worked as a researcher before and after his PhD (1999–2003). In 2003, Wößmann became Senior Researcher at the ifo Institute, where he took over the leadership of the ifo Center for the Economics of Education one year later. Following his habilitation in 2006, he has worked as a professor of economics at LMU Munich. In parallel to his academic career in Germany, Wößmann has also held visiting appointments at the Hoover Institution (2007, 2014–15), at Harvard University (2007) and at Aarhus Business School in Denmark (2006).

Wößmann maintains affiliations with several economic research institutions around the world, including the IZA Institute of Labor Economics, CESifo, Warwick's Centre for Competitive Advantage in the Global Economy (CAGE), and Harvard University's Program on Education Policy and Governance (PEPG). Moreover, he is a fellow of the International Academy of Education, sits on the editorial boards of the Economics of Education Review and Education Economics, is a member of the executive committee of the German Economic Association and chairs its Research Committee on the Economics of Education. Finally, he is also a member of the Academic Advisory Council of the Federal Ministry of Economic Affairs and Energy (BMWi) as well as of the German Academy of Science and Engineering and the Academy of Sciences Leopoldina.

== Academic research ==
Wößmann's research has focused on educational achievement and long-term economic growth and development. According to IDEAS/RePEc, Wößmann belongs to the 1% of most cited economists, with a leading position in rankings of education economists. Together with Eric A. Hanushek and Stephen Machin, Wößmann has been a co-editor of the Handbook of the Economics of Education, the main academic reference in the field of economics of education, since 2011.

=== Student achievement ===
One major strand of Wößmann's research studies the determinants of student achievement, including the role of class size and teacher quality, of educational institutions and education systems, and of tracking and early childhood education. Key themes that emerge from this research focus on the often small effect of quantitative educational inputs such as class size, on students' cognitive skills in developed countries and the substantial effects of educational institutions and systems as well as of the quality of teaching. In this context, Wößmann's analyses of students' performance using TIMSS and PISA data find central exams and control mechanisms, school autonomy in personnel and process decisions, individual teachers' influence over teaching methods, limits to teacher unions' influence on curriculum scope, scrutiny of students' achievements and competition from private schools to be related with higher student performance, findings for which Wößmann and John Bishop provide theoretical foundations. As a consequence, Wößmann has argued in favour of policies promoting school accountability, school autonomy, and school choice, the latter including school choice through public funding for private schools as means to improve learning outcomes. However, while Wößmann emphasizes that school autonomy has positively affected student achievement in developed countries or countries with high-performing education systems, he also cautions that school autonomy may have the opposite effect in countries with low-performing education systems, including many developing countries. In other words, he emphasizes that educational reforms need to be applied with nuance.

Moving beyond the efficiency of education, Wößmann (with Gabriela Schütz and Heinrich Ursprung) has also investigated the inequality of educational opportunity in developed and emerging countries and finds the organisational setup of the education system to have a substantial effect. In particular, he finds private financing of education (but not publicly funded private schools), early tracking and very short as well as very long preschool education to exacerbate educational inequality. Relatedly, Wößmann finds family background to strongly and similarly affect student performance in both European countries and the United States, with the influence of family background being strongest in Germany and Britain and lowest in France and Flemish Belgium. In sum, however, Wößmann argues that education and training systems can advance efficiency and equity at the same time by exploiting complementarities between high returns to (public) educational investment concentrating during early childhood for poor families and high returns during later stages for wealthier families through a policy mix which effectively includes public early childhood education and lifelong training in addition to conventional vocational and higher education.

=== Economic growth and development ===
The other major strand of Wößmann's research addresses the determinants of long-run economic development and short-run economic growth, including education, religion, culture, innovation, and economic structure. Addressing Lant Pritchett's puzzle of a missing link between growth rates in schooling and in economic output, Wößmann and Eric Hanushek find that cognitive skills, rather than mere schooling, are most strongly related to individual earnings, income inequality and economic growth, with important roles for both minimal and high-level skills as well as for complementarities between skills and economic institutions. Consequently, they conclude that measures of school enrollment and attainment tend to underestimate the very large gap between the skill levels of developing and developed countries' populations and that global economic convergence requires a closing of that gap, including through the restructuring of developing countries' educational institutions. Relatedly, Wößmann and Hanushek find that using educational attainment instead of school attainment as a measure of human capital enabled lower growth in Latin American countries' human capital in the second half of the 20th century to largely solve the "Latin American growth puzzle" by explaining up to two-thirds of income differences between that region and the rest of the world. The initial conclusion of Wößmann and Hanushek's research of a strong positive relationship between countries' growth in cognitive skills and economic output has been robust to more sophisticated measures of cross-country educational achievement.

More recently, Wößmann's research has also investigated the international returns to skills as well as the labour market outcomes of different types of education. Criticizing again the use of school attainment as a measure of human capital as well as previous studies' focus on early career earnings, Wößmann and Hanushek (with Guido Schwerdt and Simon Wiederhold) find the lifetime returns to skills based on PIAAC data on adult skills to be about a quarter higher than earlier estimates. Differences between countries' returns to skills estimates are considerable: 14 out of 23 countries display returns to skills in excess of 12% per standard deviation increase, with six countries sporting returns to skills in excess of 21%, the largest returns being offered in the United States at 28%; generally, higher union density, stricter employment protection and larger public sectors are associated with lower returns to skills. Comparing the employment outcomes of general and vocational education, Wößmann, Hanushek and Lei Zhang identify a tradeoff between the gains in youth employment afforded by vocational education and the increased adaptability and higher prime-age employment associated with general education, especially in the context of technological change.

In another part of his research on economic growth, Wößmann has studied the roles of innovation, trade, structural change, and the internet. Analysing the impact of structural change in a dual economy on growth, Wößmann and Jonathan Temple argue that changes in the structure of employment will increase productivity more the higher the inequality between both sectors' marginal products of labour, suggesting that differences in labour reallocation may account for a substantial part of cross-country differences in economic growth. Drawing on theories of the relationship between trade and growth, Wößmann investigates whether innovation in Germany causes exports and suggests that innovation aimed at addressing specific challenges faced by manufacturing on average increases the export share of these firms by about 7%. Last, in their estimation of the effect of broadband infrastructure, a prerequisite for high-speed internet, Wößmann, Nina Czernich, Oliver Falck and Tobias Kretschmer find that a 10% increase in broadband penetration among OECD countries is associated with an increase in annual per capita growth of 0.9–1.5pp.

Regarding long-term economic development, Wößmann has been investigating the roles of education, religion and culture in work with fellow economist Sascha Becker. Challenging Max Weber's theory of Protestants' work ethic as the main cause for their higher prosperity, they instead argue that Protestant economies prospered because Protestant society emphasized laypeople's Bible lecture, which in turn increased human capital and, by extension, economic prosperity, and find Prussian Protestants' higher literacy in the 19th century to account for most of the difference in economic prosperity to Catholics. In another use of historical Prussian census data, Wößmann, Becker and Francesco Cinnirella present evidence for the existence of a trade-off between child quantity and child education prior to the beginning of Germany's demographic transition, with an endogenous relationship between fertility and education. Finally, in a study of the long-term impact of the Habsburg Empire's civil service on public attitudes, Wößmann, Becker, Katrin Boeckh and Christa Hainz find a positive "Habsburg effect" on current trust and bureaucratic integrity for individuals living in border communities that were narrowly within the Habsburg Empire relative to those that were narrowly without.

== Selected awards ==
- Gustav Stolper Prize (Verein für Socialpolitik): 2017
- Gossen Prize (Verein für Socialpolitik): 2014
- Bruce H. Choppin Memorial Award (International Association for the Evaluation of Educational Achievement): 2005
- Young Economist Award (European Economic Association): 2003
- EIB Prize (European Investment Bank): 2001
