= Center for European Governance and Economic Development Research =

- Established: 1999
- Research type: Interdisciplinary research institute
- Field of research: European integration, governance and development research
- Location: Germany
- Campus: University of Göttingen

The Center for European, Governance and Economic Development Research (cege) is an interdisciplinary research institute of the University of Göttingen, Germany. The cege was founded in 1999 by Prof. Dr. Renate Ohr. It analyzes European and global economic structures, the effects of economic incentives on a national and international scale, as well as with processes of growth and development in developed and developing countries.

== Activities ==
The cege conducts researches and supports research projects in the fields European integration, governance and development research.

=== Symposium ===
On a regular basis, the cege organizes symposiums on current European policy issues.

- On the importance of referenda in the process of European integration, 2009 (Participants among others: Lars Feld, Roland Vaubel, Christian Calliess)
- Globalisation in critical discussion (Participants among others: Norbert Berthold, Rolf Langhammer, Wilhelm Kohler)
- Globalisation - A challenge for economic policy 2003 (Participants among others: Friedrich L. Sell, Axel Dreher, Wolf Schäfer)

=== Research Seminar ===
The cege organizes a research seminar to promote scientific exchange. Presenters include Justus Haucap, Carl Christian von Weizsäcker, Michael C. Burda, Christoph M. Schmidt und Bruno Frey.

=== Third-party funded projects ===
The cege studied on behalf of Transparency International the extent and consequences of corruption, also with regard to central banks.

Cege is involved in the project "Responsive Regulation of Innovation Behaviour for Sustainability (ReSINa)“. ReSINa is funded by the German Federal Ministry of Education and Research. It is a joint project of the University of Göttingen (cege – Center for European, Governance and Economic Development Research), the University of Augsburg (CEPRA – Centre for Performance Research & Analytics) and the College of Darmstadt (sofia – Society for Institutional Analysis).
