= Heinrich Herkner =

German economist

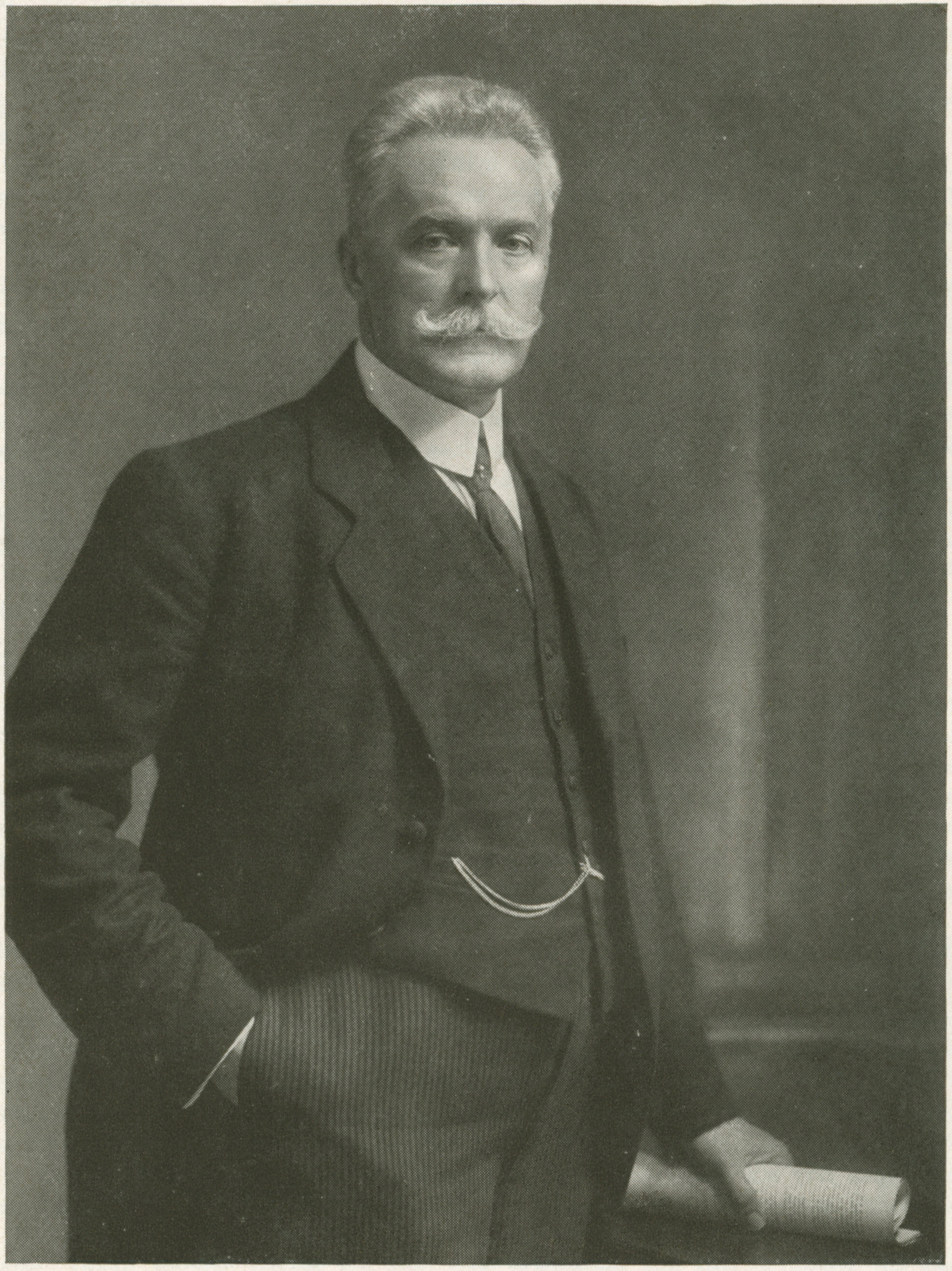
- Born: 27 June 1863; Reichenberg, Bohemia, Austrian Empire
- Died: 27 May 1932 (aged 68); Berlin, Germany

Academic background
- Education: University of Strasbourg
- Doctoral advisor: Lujo Brentano

Academic work
- Institutions: Frederick William University
- Doctoral students: Toni Stolper

Heinrich Herkner (27 June 1863 – 27 May 1932) was a German economist as well as a social reformer.

== Biography ==
Herkner was born in Liberec (German: Reichenberg), Bohemia and died in Berlin, Germany.

Herkner studied with Lujo Brentano in Strasbourg. Later he taught as a professor at the universities of Freiburg (1890–1892), Karlsruhe (1892–1898), and Zürich (1898–1907), as well as the Technical University (1907–1913) and Frederick William University (1913–1932) of Berlin.

Herkner was originally a Marxist who later evolved towards realist views. Alexandra Kollontai went to Zürich to study under him, but found he had become a “revisionist” and spent much of her time at the university contesting his views.

His major work was Die Arbeiterfrage, first published in 1894.

He was a founding member of the German Society for Sociology and along with Max Weber, Ferdinand Tönnies and Georg Simmel on its first board. In 1917 he succeeded the deceased Gustav Schmoller as the President of the Verein für Socialpolitik, a position he held until 1929.

== Works ==
- Die oberelsässische Baumwollenindustrie und ihre Arbeiter. Auf Grund der Thatsachen dargestellt, 1887
- Die soziale Reform als Gebot des wirtschaftlichen Fortschritts, 1891
- Die Arbeiterfrage, 1894
- Der Kampf um das sittliche Werturteil in der Nationalökonomie, in: Schmollers Jb. f. Gesetzgebung, Verw. u. Volkswirtschaft im Dt. Reiche 36 (1912), 515-555
- Krieg und Volkswirtschaft, 1915
- Deutschland und Deutsch-Österreich, 1919
- Liberalismus und Nationalismus 1848-1890, 1930
