= Monika Schnitzer =

German economist

Monika Schnitzer (born September 9, 1961, in Mannheim) is a German economist and chair of comparative economic research at LMU Munich. She was the president of the Verein für Socialpolitik from 2015 to 2016 and is the chairwoman of the German Council of Economic Experts since 2022.

== Education ==
Schnitzer graduated with a diploma in economics from the University of Cologne in 1986. She went on to further study at the University of Bonn and received her doctorate (Ph.D.) in 1991. She was granted a habilitation at the same university in 1995.

== Career ==
LMU Munich appointed Schnitzer to her current position in 1996.

In addition to her academic work, Schnitzer advised the German Federal Ministry of Economic Affairs and Energy and the European Commission from 2011 to 2020. From 2011 to 2019, she served as deputy chair of the Commission of Experts for Research and Innovation (EFI). She is a fellow of the European Economic Association.

In 2025, the government of Chancellor Friedrich Merz appointed Schnitzer as member of an expert commission to advise Minister of Finance Lars Klingbeil on reforming Germany's rules on public debt, co-chaired by Stephan Weil, Eckhardt Rehberg and Stephan Müller.

== Research and position ==
Schnitzer's research is mainly in Industrial economics and external trade. Some of her positions following ordoliberalistic views of economy, society and idea of man.

== Other activities ==
=== Non-profit organizations ===
- Centre for Economic Policy Research (CEPR), Member of the Steering Committee of the Competition Policy Research and Policy Network
- Center for European Economic Research (ZEW), Member of the Scientific Advisory Board
- Ifo Institute for Economic Research, Member of the Board of Trustees
- Max Planck Institute for Biological Intelligence, Member of the Board of Trustees
- Deutsches Museum, Member of the Board of Trustees

=== Editorial boards ===
- German Economic Review, Member of the Board of Editors
- Wirtschaftsdienst, Member of the Scientific Advisory Board

== Recognition ==
- 2005 – Order of Merit of the Federal Republic of Germany
- 2012 – Bavarian Order of Merit
- 2019 – Honorary Doctorate from Kiel University
- 2022 - Gustav Stolper Prize

== Personal life ==
Schnitzer is married to fellow economist Klaus M. Schmidt. The couple has three daughters.
