= The Green Paradox =

Book by economist Hans-Werner Sinn

The Green Paradox is a controversial book by German economist, Hans-Werner Sinn, describing the observation that an environmental policy that becomes greener with the passage of time acts like an announced expropriation for the owners of fossil fuel resources, inducing them to accelerate resource extraction and hence to accelerate global warming.

== Main line of reasoning ==
The Green Paradox's line of reasoning starts by recognizing a fundamental, unavoidable fact: every carbon atom in the gas, coal or oil extracted from the ground to be used as fuel ends up in the atmosphere, in particular if high efficiency combustion processes ensure that no part of it ends up as soot. About a quarter of the emitted carbon will stay in the atmosphere practically forever, contributing to the greenhouse effect that causes global warming.

Apart from afforestation, only two things can mitigate the accumulation of carbon in the atmosphere: either less carbon is extracted from the ground, or it is injected back underground after harvesting its energy.

Environmental policy efforts, in particular European ones, move in the first direction, aiming at the promotion of alternative, CO_{2}-free energy sources and a more efficient use of energy, both of which should cut demand for hydrocarbons. While the author, Hans-Werner Sinn in particular claims that support schemes for renewable energy sources have little effect, he overlooks government support to fossil fuel consumption and production. In OECD countries and key emerging economies such support is high, at US$160–200 billion annually, according to an OECD report. This support is said to hamper global efforts to curb emissions and combat climate change.

According to Sinn green policies, by heralding a gradual tightening of policy over the coming decades, exert a stronger downward pressure on future prices than on current ones, decreasing thus the rate of capital appreciation of the fossil fuel deposits. The owners of these resources regard this development with concern and react by increasing extraction volumes, converting the proceeds into investments in the capital markets, which offer higher yields. That is the green paradox: environmental policy slated to become greener over time acts as an announced expropriation that provokes owners to react by accelerating the rate of extraction of their fossil fuel stocks, thus accelerating climate change.

Countries that do not partake of the efforts to curb demand have a double advantage. They burn the carbon set free by the “green” countries (leakage effect) and they also burn the additional carbon extracted as a reaction to the announced and expected price cuts resulting from the gradual greening of environmental policies (green paradox).

Sinn writes in his abstract that: "[Demand reduction strategies] simply depress the world price of carbon and induce the environmental sinners to consume what the Kyoto countries have economized on. Even worse, if suppliers feel threatened by a gradual greening of economic policies in the Kyoto countries that would damage their future prices, they will extract their stocks more rapidly, thus accelerating global warming."

Sinn emphasises that a condition for the green paradox is that the resource be scarce in the sense that its price will always be higher than the unit extraction and exploration costs combined. He claims that this condition is likely to be satisfied as backstop technologies will at best offer a perfect substitute for electricity, but not for fossil fuels. The prices of coal and crude oil are currently many times higher than the corresponding exploration and extraction costs combined.

== Practicable solutions ==
An effective climate policy must perforce focus on the hitherto neglected supply side of the carbon market in addition to the demand side. The ways proposed as practicable by Sinn include levying a withholding tax on the capital gains on the financial investments of fossil fuel resource owners, or the establishment of a seamless global emissions trading system that would effectively put a cap on worldwide fossil fuel consumption, thereby achieving the desired reduction in carbon extraction rates.

A suggestion for a solution might also be to pay suppliers for the destruction of fossil fuels (or transform them into raw material (not fuel)), thus making sure that independence from fossil fuels on the demand side still pays off, while there is reduction in carbon extraction.

== Works on the subject ==
Hans-Werner Sinn's ideas on the green paradox have been presented in detail in a number of scientific articles, his 2007 Thünen Lecture at the annual meeting of the Verein für Socialpolitik, his 2007 presidential address to the International Institute of Public Finance in Warwick, two working papers, and a German-language book, “Das Grüne Paradoxon” (2008). They build on his earlier studies on supply reactions of the owners of natural resources to announced price changes.

== See also ==
- Jevons paradox – Efficiency leads to increased demand

== Notes and references ==
- Sinn (2008). Das grüne Paradoxon: Plädoyer für eine illusionsfreie Klimapolitik (in German). Berlin: Econ. ISBN 978-3-430-20062-2. OCLC 276147108.
