= CEGE =

CEGE or Cege may refer to:

- Center for European Governance and Economic Development Research, a research institute at the University of Göttingen
- Comité de Enlace del Guidismo en España, the national guiding association of Spain
- Cege, the Hungarian name for Țaga Commune, Romania

== See also ==
- Cege wa Kibiru, a Kenyan religious leader
