= Ethan Kaplan =

American economist

Ethan Kaplan is an associate professor of economics at the University of Maryland.

== Career ==
Prior to his work at the University of Maryland, he was an assistant professor at the University of Maryland, College Park, a visiting assistant professor of economics at the University of California, Berkeley, and an assistant professor of economics at the Institute for International Economic Studies at Stockholm University in Sweden.

=== Papers ===
A working paper authored by Kaplan and Stefano DellaVigna (also of the University of California at Berkeley) examining the impact of Fox News Channel on electoral outcomes received significant attention after being cited by Alan Krueger in a New York Times op-ed. In 2007, Kaplan and Stefano DellaVigna published their findings in the Quarterly Journal of Economics, finding that Fox News had a mild but statistically significant effect in boosting Republican vote share.

== Education ==
He received his Ph.D. in economics from the University of California, Berkeley, in 2005, his M.A. in development economics from Stanford University in 1999 and his B.A. in history from UC Berkeley in 1992.
