= Gustav von Schönberg =

German economist

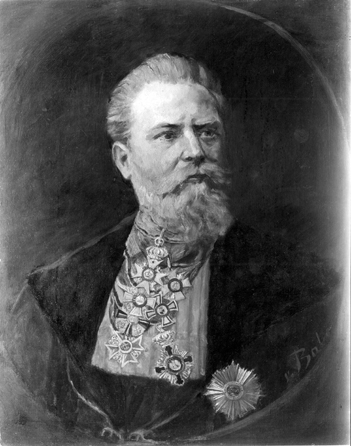
Gustav von Schönberg.

Gustav von Schönberg (21 July 1839, in Stettin – 3 January 1908) was a German economist.

Schönberg studied law and politics at the universities of Bonn and Berlin. After successfully completing these studies in 1860, he transferred to the civil service and was promoted to Gerichtsassessor within five years.

Subsequently, Schönberg worked at the Seminar of the Prussian Statistical Bureaux. In 1867, he took up the role of Lecturer in Political Economy at the Prussian Agricultural Institute in Proskau, where, among other things, he was heavily involved in the establishment of several agricultural cooperatives in Schlesien.

In autumn 1868, Schönberg was appointed Professor ordinarius of Economics at the University of Basel. In 1870, he moved to the Albert Ludwigs University of Freiburg as an economist. Three years later, he moved again to the University of Tübingen, where, in addition to his role as Professor ordinarius in Political Science, he was also Chancellor for some years. Starting in 1887, Schönberg edited the journal Tübinger Zeitschrift für die gesamte Staatswissenschaft (Tübingen Magazine for the Entire Political Sciences) together with Albert Schäffle and Karl Viktor Fricker.

Schönberg was an engaged member of the Association for Social Politics and campaigned vehemently for social issues of the "labour question".

He died in 1908 at the age of 68.

== Selected works ==
- Arbeitsämter. Eine Aufgabe des Deutschen Reichs. Berlin 1871
- Basels Bevölkerungszahl im 15. Jahrhundert. Jena 1883
- Die deutsche Freihandelsschule und die Partei der Eisenacher Versammlung vom Oktober 1872. Tübingen 1873
- Finanzverhältnisse der Stadt Basel im 14. und 15. Jahrhundert. Heidelberg 1879
- Die Frauenfrage. Basel 1872
- Handbuch der politischen Ökonomie. Tübingen 1885-86 (3 volumes, together with Benecke, Conrad, and others)
- Zur Handwerkerfrage. Heidelberg 1876
- Die Landwirtschaft der Gegenwart und das Genossenschaftsprinzip. Berlin 1869
- Die sittlich religiöse Bedeutung der sozialen Frage. 2. Aufl., Stuttgart 1876
- Die Sozialpolitik des Deutschen Reichs. Tübingen 1886
- Die Volkswirtschaft der Gegenwart im Leben und in der Wissenschaft. Basel 1869
- Die Volkswirtschaftslehre. Berlin 1873
- Zur wirtschaftlichen Bedeutung des Zunftwesens im Mittelalter. Berlin 1868
