= Nicola Fuchs-Schündeln =

German economist

- Born: 1972 (age 53–54); Cologne, West Germany

Academic background
- Education: University of Cologne; Yale University

Nicola Fuchs-Schündeln (born in Cologne in 1972) is a German economist and currently holds the Chair for Macroeconomics and Development at the Goethe University Frankfurt. Her research has been awarded the Gossen Prize in 2016 and the Leibniz Prize in 2018. The Leibniz award is considered to be one of the highest scientific awards in all of Germany.

== Biography ==
A native of Cologne, Nicola Fuchs-Schündeln earned diplomas in economics and Latin American studies from the University of Cologne in 1998 and 1999. Thereafter, she studied at Yale University, from which she obtained her M.A., M.Phil. and Ph.D. in economics in 2000, 2001 and 2004. Following her graduation, she became an assistant professor in economics at Harvard University (2004–09), before returning to Germany, where she has since then been a professor of macroeconomics and development at the Goethe University Frankfurt. In 2015/16, Fuchs-Schündeln held a visiting appointment at Stanford University. In parallel to her academic position, Fuchs-Schündeln is also affiliated with the Center for Financial Studies, IZA Institute of Labor Economics, CESifo Research Network, Centre for Economic Policy Research (CEPR), and the Global Working Group on Human Capital and Economic Opportunity (HCEO).

In terms of professional service, Fuchs-Schündeln is a member of the Council of the European Economic Association, a member of the Executive Committee of the German Economic Association, and a member of the scientific advisory boards of the German Ministry of Finance. In the past, she was part of the scientific advisory boards of the IfW Kiel and the RWI Essen. Moreover, Fuchs-Schündeln acts as Principal Investigator of the Cluster of Excellence Formation of Normative Orders and of the LOEWE Center on Sustainable Architecture for Finance in Europe (SAFE). Finally, she currently also sits on the editorial boards of the Review of Economic Studies, which she directs, and of the Journal of the European Economic Association, having previously also been an editor at the journals Economic Journal and Economics of Transition. In addition to her work as an editor, Fuchs-Schündeln co-wrote a paper titled 'stock market liberalizations: financial and macroeconomic implications' in 2001.

Nicola Fuchs-Schündeln is married to fellow economist Matthias Schündeln and has three sons.

== Research ==
Nicola Fuchs-Schündeln has performed extensive research on the economic effects of German reunification. Among else, findings of her research include the following:

- Their experience with socialism has made East Germans more in favour of state intervention than West Germans, though complete convergence of preferences is expected to occur within one to two generations (with Alberto Alesina).
- Risk-averse individuals self-select into occupations with low income risks (e.g. civil service), which in turn decreases their need for precautionary savings (with Matthias Schündeln).
- Income inequality was relatively stable until the German reunification but has increased substantially since then, especially after 1998 (with Matthias Sommer and Dirk Krueger).
- With regard to the post-reunification migration of East Germans to West Germany, mostly the old and less educated stayed, the young and educated moved, and older and single migrants returned to East Germany (with Matthias Schündeln).
