= Ulrike Malmendier =

German economist (born 1973)

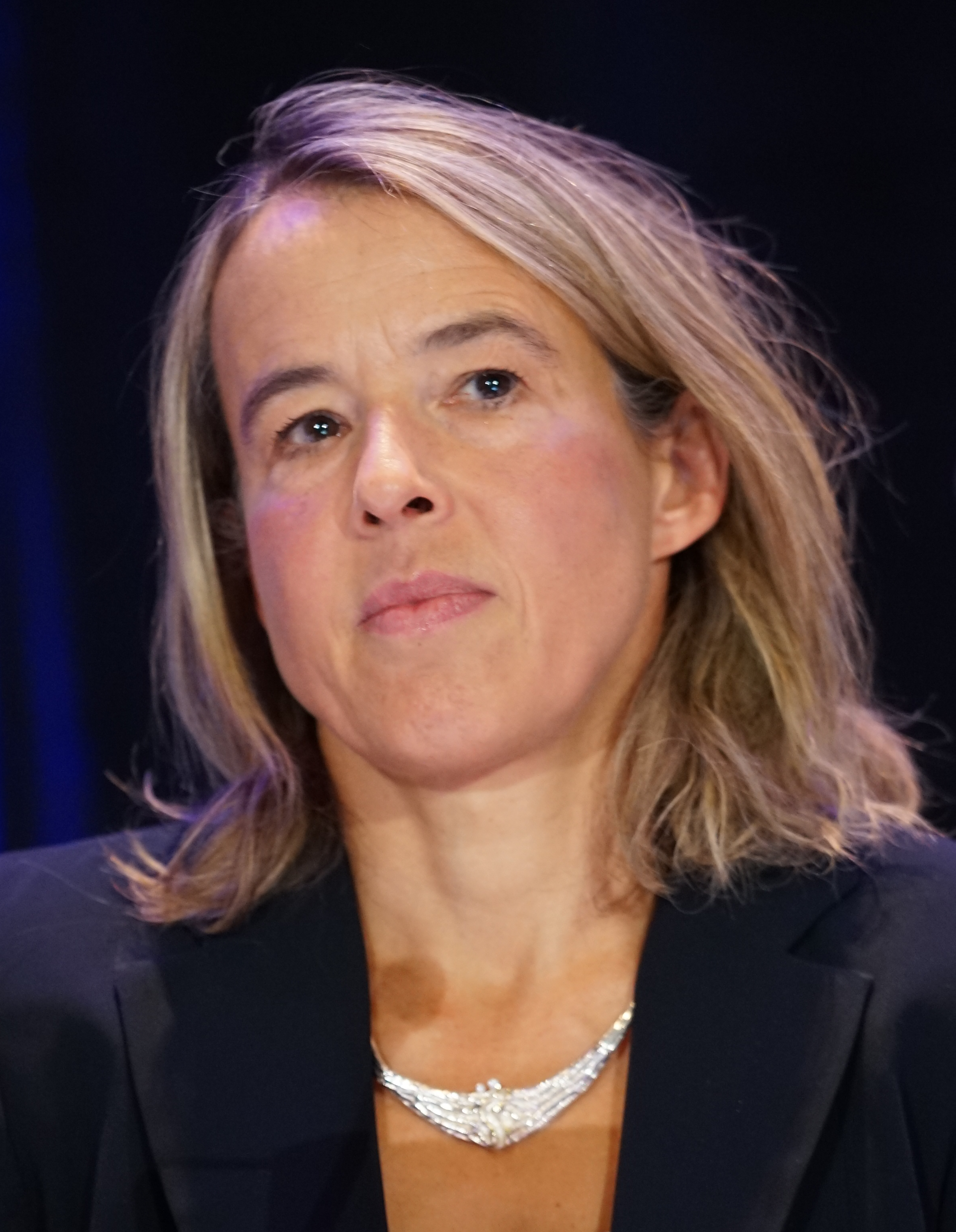
- Malmendier at ASSA 2026
- Born: 1973 (age 52–53); Cologne, West Germany
- Spouse: Stefano DellaVigna

Academic background
- Education: University of Bonn (BA, BA, MA, PhD); Harvard University (MA, PhD)
- Doctoral advisor: Andrei Shleifer

Academic work
- Discipline: Behavioral finance Law and economics
- Institutions: University of California, Berkeley; Stanford University
- Awards: Fischer Black Prize (2013)
- Website: Information at IDEAS / RePEc

Ulrike M. Malmendier (born 1973) is a German economist who is currently a professor of economics and finance at the University of California, Berkeley. Her work focuses on behavioral economics, corporate finance, and law and economics. In 2013, she was awarded the Fischer Black Prize by the American Finance Association.

IDEAS lists her as among the top 5% most cited economists and as among the top 100 young economists who started publishing 15 years ago.

== Education ==
Places of Education
University	Degree
University of Bonn	BA, Economics
University of Bonn	BA equivalent, Law
University of Bonn	MA, Economics
University of Bonn	PhD, Law
Harvard University	AM, Business Economics
Harvard University	PhD, Business Economics

== Career ==
Malmendier was born in 1973 in Cologne, then in West Germany. After high school, Malmendier trained as a bank clerk, then studied Economics on a Studienstiftung scholarship. She earned a Ph.D. in law from the University of Bonn in 2000 and a Ph.D. in business economics from Harvard Business School in 2002; her Harvard doctoral thesis was Behavioral approaches to contract theory and corporate finance. Andrei Shleifer served as Malmendier's adviser at Harvard. She worked as an assistant professor of finance at Stanford University from 2002 to 2006. During that time, she held visiting positions at the University of Chicago and Princeton University. Malmendier moved to Berkeley in 2006 where she earned tenure in 2008. She currently is a research associate at the National Bureau of Economic Research, research affiliate at the Centre for Economic Policy Research, and faculty research fellow at the Institute for the Study of Labor.

She was named Alfred P. Sloan Research Fellow (2010–2012), and she received several Citations of Excellence by Emerald for her research (2009, 2006).

In August 2022, Malmendier was appointed by the German government for a five-year term as one of the five economic experts (known as the Five Sages) who make up the German Council of Economic Experts. In October 2022, she was a member of a panel which met in Berlin to discuss the reconstruction of Ukraine.

Positions Held
Position	Location	Years
Assistant Professor of Finance	Stanford Graduate School of Business	2002-2006
Faculty Research Fellow, Labor Economics	NBER	2004- 2009
Assistant Professor of Economics	UC Berkeley	2006-2008
Faculty Research Fellow, Corporate Finance	NBER	2006-2009
Associate Professor of Economics (with tenure)	University of California, Berkeley	2008-2012
Associate Professor of Finance (with tenure)	HAAS School of Business	2010-2012
Faculty Research Fellow	Institute for the Study of Labor (IZA)	2005–present
Affiliate	CESifo	2006–present
Research Affiliate, Labour Economics	CEPR	2006–present
Research Affiliate, Financial Economics	Centre for Economic Policy Research (CEPR)	2007–present
Research Associate, Corporate Finance and Labor Economics	National Bureau of Economic Research (NBER)	2009–present
Professor of Economics	University of California Berkeley	2012–present
Professor of Finance	HAAS School of Business	2012–present
Economic Advisor	German Council of Economic Experts	2022–2026

== Work ==
Malmendier's work focuses on behavioral economics, corporate finance, and law and economics. She has conducted extensive research on CEO overconfidence where she found that overconfident CEOs invested too much money in their companies and pursued destructive acquisitions more frequently than other managers.

She has explored how behavioral biases affect financial decision-making in other contexts. Malmendier has found that people who lived through the Great Depression remain more frugal throughout their lives, a majority of people overestimate how often they will visit the gym, and that security analysts distort recommendations for profit.

Malmendier has also done research into the origin of shareholder companies. She has examined an early form of shareholder company in ancient Rome called the societas publicanorum.

== Honors and awards ==
In 2013, she won the prestigious Fischer Black Prize, presented biennially by the American Finance Association for significant original research in finance. In 2019, she was awarded the Gustav Stolper Prize by the German Verein für Socialpolitik. In 2021, she was named a Fellow of the Econometric Society.

== Personal life ==
Malmendier is married to fellow Berkeley economics professor Stefano DellaVigna.
