= Wolfgang Stolper =

American economist (1912–2002)

Wolfgang F. Stolper
- Born: 13 May 1912; Vienna, Austria-Hungary
- Died: 31 March 2002 (aged 89); Ann Arbor, Michigan

Academic background
- Education: Harvard University
- Doctoral advisor: Joseph Schumpeter

Academic work
- Institutions: University of Michigan; Swarthmore College
- Notable ideas: Stolper–Samuelson theorem

Wolfgang Friedrich Stolper (13 May 1912 – 31 March 2002) was an American economist who was Professor at Swarthmore College and University of Michigan. He is known for proposing the Stolper–Samuelson theorem, along with Paul A. Samuelson.

== Biography ==
Stolper was born in Vienna, the eldest son of economists Gustav Stolper and Toni Stolper. In 1925 the family moved to Berlin and emigrated in 1933 to the United States. In 1938 Stolper completed a PhD in economics studies at Harvard University. He was a student of Joseph Schumpeter.

From 1938 to 1943, Stolper was assistant professor of economics at Swarthmore College, Swarthmore PA. In 1945, he participated in the Strategic Bombing Survey (Europe).

From 1949, Stolper was Professor of Economics at the University of Michigan, Ann Arbor.

In 1941 Stolper together with Paul A. Samuelson proposed the Stolper–Samuelson theorem.

In 1960, Stolper worked for Nigeria's development ministry.

In 1986 Stolper was a co-founder of the International Joseph A. Schumpeter Society.

== Selected publications ==
- Samuelson, Paul A.; Stolper, Wolfgang F. (1941). "Protection and Real Wages". Review of Economic Studies. 9 (1): 58–73. doi:10.2307/2967638. JSTOR 2967638. S2CID 153734773.
- Wolfgang F. Stolper: British monetary policy and the housing boom. Cambridge, Mass. Harvard Univ. Press, 1941.
- Wolfgang F. Stolper: Strukturwandlungen der amerikanischen Wirtschaft seit dem Kriege. Essen. Archiv-Verl. Hoppenstedt Merten, 1956.
- Wolfgang F. Stolper: The National Product of East Germany, 1959, Kyklos.
- Wolfgang F. Stolper: The Structure of the East German economy. (Center for International Studies; Massachusetts Inst. of Technology] / Wolfgang F. Stolper. With the assistance of Karl W. Roskamp. Cambridge : Harvard University Press, 1960.
- Wolfgang F. Stolper: Germany Between East and West, 1960
- Wolfgang F. Stolper: National Accounting in East Germany, 1961, in P. Deane, editor, Studies in Social and Financial Accounting, Income and Wealth [pdf]
- Wolfgang F. Stolper: Planning Without Facts, 1966
- Wolfgang F. Stolper: Planning a Free Economy: Germany 1945-1960 with K.W. Roskamp, 1979, ZfGS/JITE [pdf]
- Wolfgang F. Stolper: Joseph Alois Schumpeter : The Public Life of a Private Man, Princeton, NJ : Princeton Univ. Press, 1994.
- The Newsletter of the International Joseph A. Schumpeter Society. ISS Forum No. 7. August 2002
