= Wilhelm Röpke Institute =

Economic research institute

The Wilhelm Röpke Institut is an economic research institute in the Thuringian state capital Erfurt.

== History ==
The institute was named after the German economist Wilhelm Röpke. It was founded on May 23, 2007, and has the legal form of a registered association. It was initiated, among others, by the economist Thomas Straubhaar.

The institute is in close cooperation with the Hamburg Institute of International Economics, which operated a temporary branch office in Erfurt in the early days. The institute is one of the initiators of the Jena Alliance and is a partner of NOUS – Network for Economics of Order and Social Philosophy. In addition to other cooperations with various domestic and foreign research institutions, the institute is associated with the Faculty of Political Science at the University of Erfurt. After initially being located in Erfurt's Gorkistraße, it has now moved to the Faculty of Political Science.

== Tasks and goals ==
The central task of the institute is to reappraise the legacy of the economist Röpke. This includes, in addition to the promotion of young academics, two areas of responsibility. On the one hand, according to the statutes, "research is to be conducted in the field of economic policy, whereby the intellectual legacy of Wilhelm Röpke is of central importance, on the reform processes in the young federal states and in East-Central and Eastern Europe, as well as on the economic development and business cycle in Thuringia". In addition, these "results of the research are to be made accessible to a broader public through public events, workshops, etc."

The second task area is the research of Röpke's intellectual legacy. This includes researching the estate. The Institute holds the Wilhelm Röpke Lecture once a year and also seminars and colloquia. In addition, the Institute organizes the conferences on the New Economics of Order at Ettersburg Castle, as well as other individual conferences. For example, the 2016 International Wilhelm Röpke Congress in Geneva, which the Institute organized together with the Graduate Institute Geneva and the Liberal Institute.

== Membership structure ==
The institute has an international field of members. In addition to well-known economists such as economist Lars Feld, Michel Wohlgemuth, Nils Goldschmidt, Joachim Starbatty and Gerhard Wegner, it also includes prominent economic journalists such as Karen Horn, representatives of associations such as Gerald Grusser, and scholars from other disciplines. Among others, the political scientist Aurelian Craiutu, who teaches in the U.S., the Italian philosopher Dario Antiseri, the French Germanist Patricia Commun, and the German jurist Hermann-Josef Blanke are members.
