= Lars Feld =

German economist

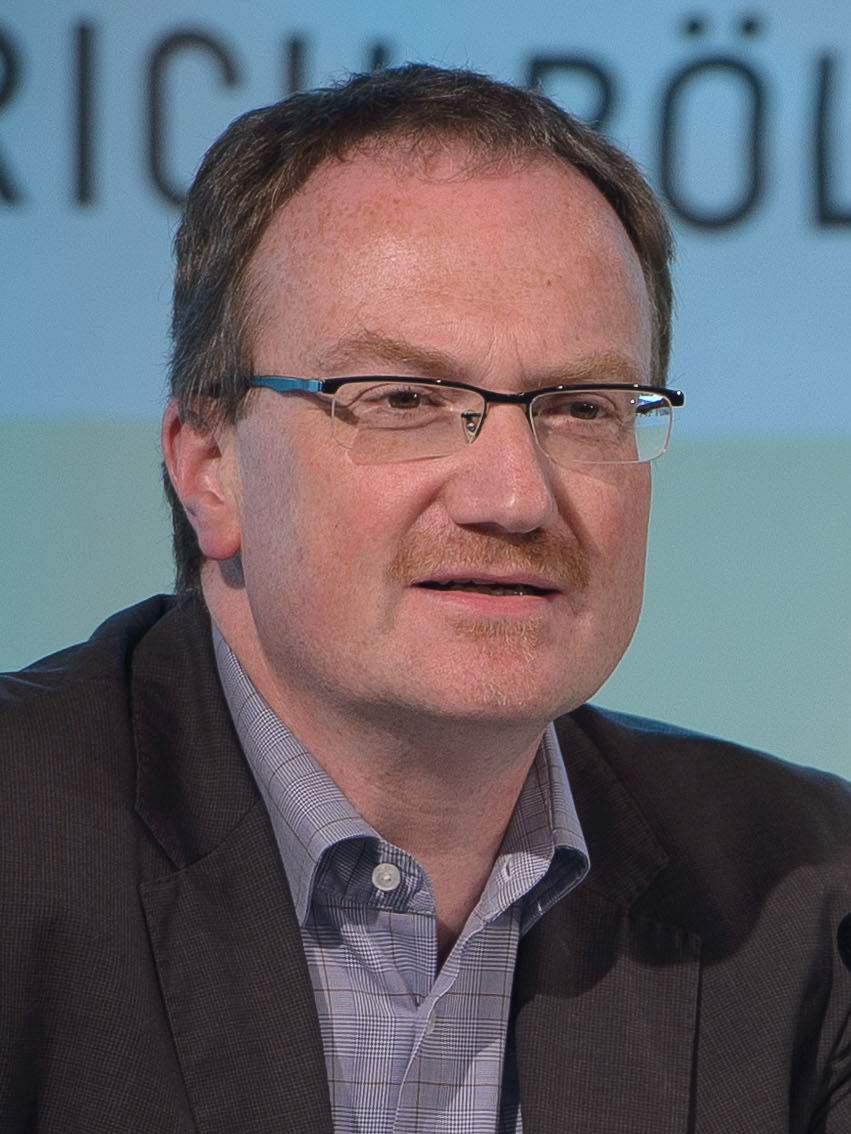
- Feld in 2015
- Born: Lars Peter Feld; August 9, 1966 (age 59); Saarbrücken, Germany
- Education: Saarland University (Dr. oec, 1999); University of St. Gallen (Ph.D., 2002)
- Occupation: Director of the Walter Eucken Institut
- Spouse: married
- Children: three sons

Lars Peter Feld (born August 9, 1966, in Saarbrücken) is a German economist who currently serves as director of the Walter Eucken Institut and as Professor for Economic Policy at the University of Freiburg. From 2020 to 2021 he also chaired the German Council of Economic Experts. Federal Minister of Finance Christian Lindner made Feld his personal economic policy advisor in February 2022.

Feld is a prominent advocate for a German strand of economics, ordoliberalism, that staunchly rejects public debt.

== Early life and education ==
Feld studied economics at Saarland University. He obtained his doctorate and habilitation in economics in 1999 and 2002, respectively, both from the University of St. Gallen.

== Career ==
From 2002 until 2005 Feld was visiting academic in economics at the University of Rennes 1. At the same time, from 2002 until 2006, he served as professor for economics and finance at the University of Marburg and, since 2002, he also serves as associate professor for Economics at the University of St. Gallen.

Since 2008 Feld has been a member of the Kronberger Kreis of the Stiftung Marktwirtschaft and in this context calls for more private liability within the European bank union.

From 2006 until 2010 Feld held the chair for finance at the University of Heidelberg. At the same time he was offered a research professorship at the Centre for European Economic Research (ZEW) in Mannheim which he took on in 2006. In addition to this, since 2007, he is visiting academic at the Centre for European Economic Research (ZEW) in Mannheim. During this time he worked as curator for student business consulting GalileiConsult e.V. in Heidelberg.

Since September 2010 Feld has been professor for economic policy at the University of Freiburg and serves as lead executive at the Walter Eucken Institute.

From 2011 to 2021, Feld served as a member of the German Council of Economic Experts; in 2020, he became the body's chairman. He left the position in 2021 after he was not reappointed to a third term by Federal Minister of Finance Olaf Scholz.

Since 2013, Feld has also been serving on the advisory board of the Stability Council, a body devised as part of Germany’s national implementation of the European Fiscal Compact.

In 2022, Feld declined an offer to lead the Institute for Advanced Studies (IHS).

== Selected publications ==
- Burret, Heiko T.; ———; Koehler, Ekkehard A. (2014). "Panel Cointegration Tests on the Fiscal Sustainability of German Laender". CESifo Working Paper Series No. 4929. SSRN 2496332.
- ———; Ruf, Martin; Scheuering, Uwe; Schreiber, Ulrich; Voget, Johannes (2013). "Effects of Territorial and Worldwide Corporation Tax Systems on Outbound M&As" (PDF). ZEW Discussion Paper No. 13-088. Mannheim.
- Asatryan, Zareh; ——— (2014). "Revisiting the Link Between Growth and Federalism: A Bayesian Model Averaging Approach" (PDF). Journal of Comparative Economics. 43 (3): 772–781. doi:10.1016/j.jce.2014.04.005. S2CID 152561598.
- ———; Heckemeyer, Jost Henrich (2011). "FDI and Taxation: A Meta-Study" (PDF). Journal of Economic Surveys. 25 (2): 233–272. doi:10.1111/j.1467-6419.2010.00674.x. S2CID 53373871.

== Other activities ==
- Grüner Wirtschaftsdialog, Member of the Advisory Board (since 2021)
- Econwatch, Member of the Board of Trustees (since 2012)
- RWI Essen, Member of the Scientific Advisory Board (since 2011)
- German Institute for Economic Research (DIW), Member of the Scientific Advisory Board (since 2010)
- Academy of Sciences Leopoldina, Member (since 2008)
- Kronberger Kreis, Stiftung Marktwirtschaft, Member (since 2008)
- Mehr Demokratie, Member of the Board of Trustees
- VDMA Impuls-Stiftung, Member of the Board of Trustees
- Herbert Giersch Stiftung, Member of the Advisory Board
- Ludwig Erhard Foundation, Member
- Wirtschaftsrat der CDU, Member of the Scientific Advisory Board
- Mont Pelerin Society, Member
- Wilhelm Röpke Institute, Member
- German Council on Foreign Relations (DGAP), Member of the Steering Committee (-2016)
- European Public Choice Society (EPCS), President (2007-2009)

== Personal life ==
Feld is married and has three sons.
