= Teacher quality =

Teacher quality is said to be the most important factor influencing learner outcomes. The Education for All Goals set by UNESCO have been achieved by some countries but many millions of children remain out of school or with poor teachers.

According to UNESCO and the OECD, developed and developing countries across the world are grappling unsuccessfully with the problem of providing up to date teacher education both Initial Professional Development and continuing professional development to a diverse and large workforce (450,000 in England, 1.3M in Pakistan in 2006).

== Teacher training ==
Teachers have different backgrounds making the targeting of professional development programmes difficult. Some may have little or no teacher training, others may have doctorates in specialist subjects but no training in pedagogy – the science of teaching and learning. In other cases, teachers may be much more deeply knowledgeable having studied for their qualifications over four or more years. As well as varied backgrounds, teachers often work in remote areas. Organisation for Economic Co-operation and Development (OECD research across 20 countries (2009) confirms that improving the quality of teachers’ knowledge (see Lee Shulman’s definition) is the intervention most likely to bring about improvements in learning and educational outcomes.

== A call for knowledge management for the worldwide education sector ==
To address this problem, the OECD calls for the: “creation of ‘knowledge-rich’, evidence-based education systems...in many countries, education is still far from being a knowledge industry in the sense that its own practices are not yet being transformed by knowledge about the efficacy of those practices.” (OECD, 2009, p. 3)

== Translational research and examples from the medical sector ==
By way of contrast, the medical sector has established structures and processes worldwide addressing knowledge mobilisation. The concept of Translational research i.e., how research findings might apply in practice is much more developed in medicine than in the education sector.

== Systematic reviews and rapid evidence assessments ==
Systematic reviews and rapid evidence assessment methodology is also well developed and engage tens of thousands of medical practitioners worldwide via the Cochrane Collaboration and the associated Cochrane Library. The Campbell Collaboration is the educational equivalent.

== Clinical Pathway approach ==
The Clinical Pathway approach which appears well established in medicine as demonstrated by the Map of Medicine HealthGuides and National Institute for Health and Care Excellence (NICE) pathways is embryonic in education with the MESHGuides initiative. The medical sector sets a standard for knowledge sharing that the education sector could aspire to.

== Access to knowledge for teachers in remote areas ==
The above examples from the medical sector use information technology to connect up experts across the world for the benefit of all. With respect to teachers having access to online resources, even those in areas with no electricity or internet can access the latest online knowledge with a simple set up using a compujector and generator backed up by central support uploading materials to the hard disk in the compujector.

The challenge is how to ensure knowledge about effective teaching in every subject, for every concept, for every type of learner is available to teachers at the time they need it.

== Teacher attrition ==
Teacher attrition rates are high in some locations e.g., 40% in the UK in 2015. In the UK, it was reported in 2015 that 40% of teachers leave in their first year. Lack of professional development is cited by teachers leaving the profession as a major contributing factor. As the OECD suggests, more efficient knowledge management is suggested as a way to reduce losses to national economies due to pupil underperformance, teacher attrition and lack of continuing professional development to keep teachers up to date.
