= Christoph M. Schmidt =

German economist

- Christoph M. Schmidt
- Born: 25 August 1962 (age 64); Canberra, Australia

Academic background
- Education: LMU Munich; Princeton University; University of Mannheim
- Doctoral advisor: David Card

Academic work
- Discipline: Econometrics; Labor economics
- Institutions: RWI Essen
- Website: Information at IDEAS / RePEc

Christoph Matthias Schmidt (born 25 August 1962) is a German economist. Since July 2026 Christoph M. Schmidt acts as the eighth president of the Leibniz Association, one of the four big non-university research organisations in Germany. Before that he was president of RWI - Leibniz Institute for Economic Research in Essen from 2002 until 2026. He still holds the Chair for Economic Policy and Applied Econometrics at the Faculty of Management and Economics at the Ruhr-Universität Bochum.

He was a member of the German Council of Economic Experts from 2009 to 2020 and its chairman from 2013 to 2020. Since 2019 he has been a member, and since 2020 co-chairman, of the Franco-German Council of Economic Experts. From 2011 to 2013, he was a member of the Enquete Commission "Growth, Prosperity, Quality of Life" of the German Bundestag. From 2020 to 2021 he was a member of the "Corona-Expertenrat" (Corona Council of Experts) of the Minister President of North Rhine-Westphalia. He has been a member of acatech – Deutsche Akademie der Technikwissenschaften since 2011, a member of the presidium since 2014, and vice president since 2020. He is a member of the National Academy of Sciences Leopoldina (since 2020), the Mainz Academy of Sciences and Literature (since 2015) and the North Rhine-Westphalian Academy of Sciences, Humanities and the Arts (since 2018).

He has been Chairman of the Board of Trustees of the Max Planck Institute for Tax Law and Public Finance in Munich since 2013, a member of the Board of Trustees of the Alfried Krupp von Bohlen und Halbach Foundation since 2014 and deputy chairman since 2020, a member of the Scientific Advisory Board of the Fritz Thyssen Foundation since 2016, Chairman of the Scientific Advisory Board of the Energy Economics Institute at the University of Cologne (EWI) since 2020, and since 2020, member of the expert panel of the programme for the promotion of top-level research at universities ("Exzellenzstrategie") of the Joint Science Conference (GWK) and since 2021 member of the Supervisory Board of BMW AG.

His work focuses on applied econometrics, including energy, health, and labor economics, as well as on the interface between research and science-based policy advice. He was editor of the Journal of Population Economics (1996 to 2002) and the German Economic Review (2009 to 2013). In 2016, he received the Gustav Stolper Award of the Verein für Socialpolitik, and in 2019, he received an honorary doctorate from the Faculty of Economics at Leibniz Universität Hannover. In 2019, he was also awarded the title "Bürger des Ruhrgebiets" (citizen of the Ruhr area) by the association pro Ruhrgebiet. The state of North Rhine-Westphalia has awarded the 2022 Innovation Prize in the "Honorary Award" category to Christoph M. Schmidt.

== Early life and education ==
Schmidt received his Diplom in Economics at the University of Mannheim in 1987, and his M.A. in Economics from Princeton University in 1989. He also earned his PhD from Princeton in 1991, under supervision of David Card. Schmidt received his Habilitation in 1995 from LMU Munich.

== Career ==
In 2002, Schmidt became president of the RWI - Leibniz Institute for Economic Research and in 2009 he replaced Bert Rürup on the German Council of Economic Experts (GCEE) advising the German government. He was a member of the German Council of Economic Experts from 2009 to 2020 and its chairman from 2013 to 2020. In 2014, he became member of the Steering Committee of the German Academy of Science and Engineering (acatech). He is also a member on the Board of Trustees of ESYS – Energy Systems of the Future, a joint initiative of acatech, Leopoldina and the Union of Academies.

Schmidt was co-editor of the Journal of Population Economics and the German Economic Review. His research has been published in journals like the European Economic Review, the Journal of Economic Behavior and Organization, the Journal of Health Economics, the Journal of Public Economics, and the Review of Economics and Statistics.

In April 2020, Schmidt was appointed by Minister-President Armin Laschet of North Rhine-Westphalia to a 12-member expert group to advise on economic and social consequences of the COVID-19 pandemic in Germany.

== Other activities ==
=== Corporate boards ===
- NRW.Bank, Member of the Advisory Board
- IKB Deutsche Industriebank, Member of the Advisory Board
- BMW, Member of the Supervisory Board

=== Non-profit organizations ===
- Energy and Climate Policy and Innovation Council (EPICO), Deputy Chair of the Advisory Board (since 2021)
- Fritz Thyssen Foundation, Member of the Scientific Advisory Board
- Wirtschaftsdienst, Member of the Scientific Advisory Board
- German Academy of Science and Engineering, Member of the Presidium (since 2014)
- ESYS – Energy Systems of the Future, Member of the Board of Trustees
- Alfried Krupp von Bohlen und Halbach Foundation, Member of the Board of Trustees
- Jackstädt Center for Entrepreneurship and Innovation Research, Member of the Advisory Board (since 2013)
- Max Planck Institute for Tax Law and Public Finance, Chairman of the Board of Trustees (since 2013)
- Mainz Academy of Sciences and Literature, member (since 2015)
- North Rhine-Westphalian Academy of Sciences and Arts, member (since 2018)
- Kinderstiftung Essen, Member of the Board of Trustees
- Energy Economics Institute at the University of Cologne, Chairman of the Scientific Advisory Board (since 2020)
- Franco-German Council of Economic Experts, co-chairman
- National Academy of Sciences Leopoldina, member (since 2020)
- Joint Science Conference (GWK), member of the expert panel

== Recognition ==
Schmidt was awarded the Princeton University Fellowship (1987–1990), the Alfred P. Sloan Doctoral Dissertation Fellowship (1990–1991) and a scholarship for his Habilitation from the Deutsche Forschungsgemeinschaft (DFG; English: German Research Foundation) (1992–1995). In 2020 he became a member of the German Academy of Sciences Leopoldina.

== Selected publications ==
- Bauer, Thomas K.; Bender, Stefan; Paloyo, Alfredo R.; ——— (2015). "Evaluating the labor-market effects of compulsory military service". European Economic Review. 56 (4): 814–829. doi:10.1016/j.euroecorev.2012.02.002. hdl:10419/35864. S2CID 154655048.
- Bauer, Thomas K.; Bender, Stefan; Paloyo, Alfredo R.; ——— (2014). "Do Guns Displace Books? The Impact of Compulsory Military Service on Educational Attainment". Economics Letters. 124 (3): 313–515. doi:10.1016/j.econlet.2014.07.026. hdl:10419/61364. S2CID 185892.
- Frondel, Manuel; ——— (2014). "A Measure of a Nation's Physical Energy Supply Risk". The Quarterly Review of Economics and Finance. 54 (2): 208–215. doi:10.1016/j.qref.2013.10.003. hdl:2003/31104.
- Bauer, Thomas K.; Breidenbach, Philipp; Paloyo, Alfredo R.; ——— (2012). ""Phantom of the Opera" or "Sex and the City" - Historical Amenities as Sources of Exogenous Variation". Labour Economics. 37: 93–98. doi:10.1016/j.labeco.2015.05.005. hdl:10419/103319. S2CID 18095163.
- Bauer, Thomas K.; Kluve, Jochen; Schaffner, Sandra; ——— (2009). "Fiscal Effects of Minimum Wages: An Analysis for Germany" (PDF). German Economic Review. 10 (2): 224–242. doi:10.1111/j.1468-0475.2009.00467.x. S2CID 53407727.
