= Carl Christian von Weizsäcker =

German economist (born 1938)

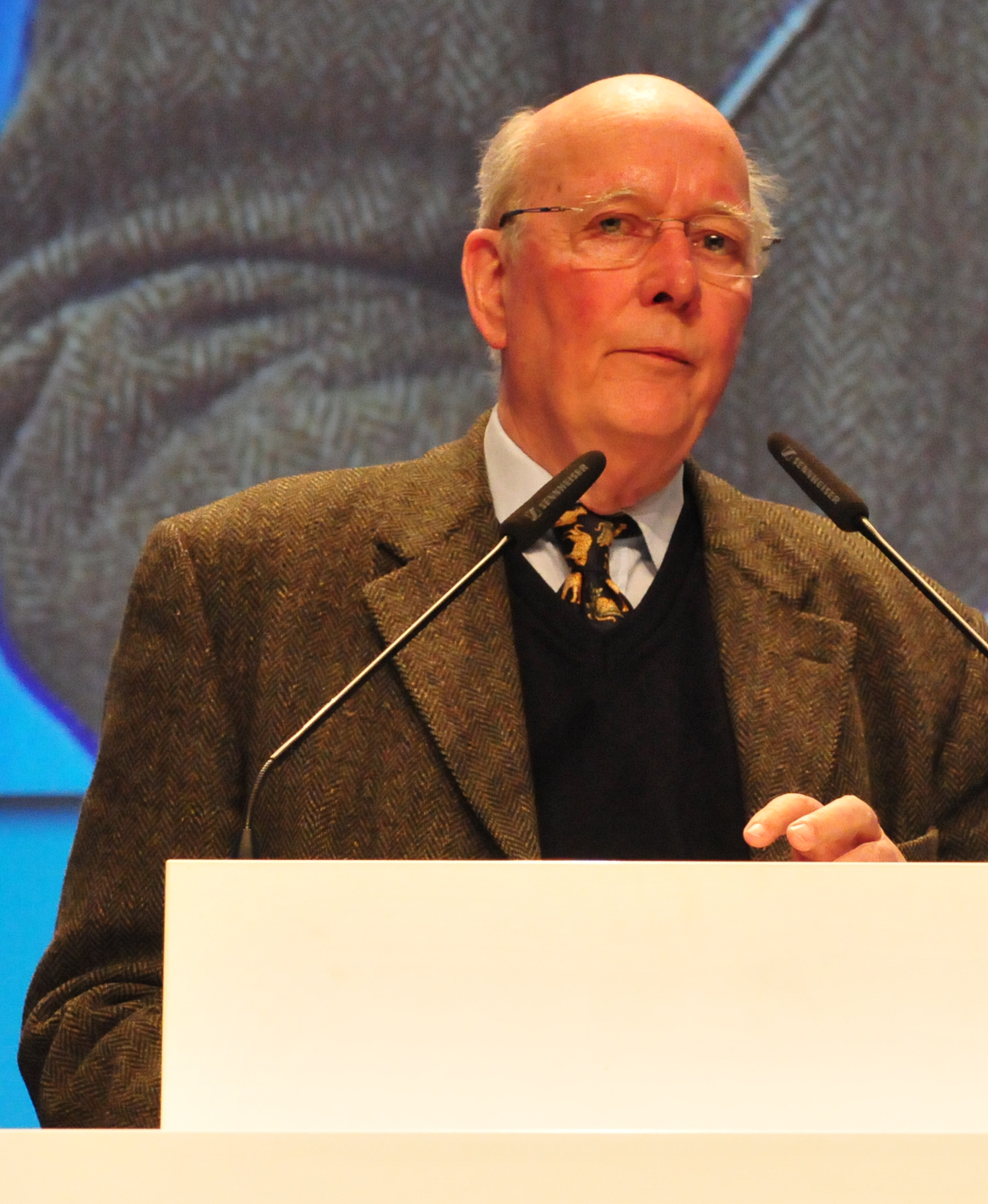
Carl Christian von Weizsäcker

Carl Christian von Weizsäcker (born in Berlin on January 28, 1938) is a German economist who currently works as a senior research fellow at the Max Planck Institute for Research on Collective Goods (MPI-EG), having emerited from the University of Cologne in 2003. Throughout his career, von Weizsäcker has worked at the Massachusetts Institute of Technology and the universities of Heidelberg, Bielefeld, Bonn, Bern and Cologne. His research focuses on welfare economics, the theory of capital, the history of economics, the Eurozone crisis, climate policy, and the social market economy. Within his profession, he is notably a founding member and fellow of the European Economic Association. In 2014, von Weizsäcker was awarded the Gustav Stolper Prize in recognition for his contributions to economic debate in Germany. He is also a Foreign Honorary Member of the American Academy of Arts and Sciences.

== Selected publications ==
- Von Weizsäcker, C. C. (1965). "Existence of Optimal Programs of Accumulation for an Infinite Time Horizon". Review of Economic Studies. 32 (2): 85–104. doi:10.2307/2296054. JSTOR 2296054.
- Von Weizsäcker, C. C. (1980). "A Welfare Analysis of Barriers to Entry". Bell Journal of Economics. 11 (2): 399–420. doi:10.2307/3003371. JSTOR 3003371.
