= Homo Oeconomicus =

- Discipline: Economics
- Language: English
- Edited by: Peter Püntener, Manfred J. Holler, John Hudson, Hartmut Kliemt, Martin Leroch

Publication details
- History: 1983–present
- Publisher: Accedo Verlag
- Frequency: Quarterly
- Open access: Yes

Standard abbreviations
- ISO 4: Homo Oecon.

Indexing
- ISSN: 0943-0180
- LCCN: 95652195
- OCLC no.: 85447794

Links
- Journal homepage; Online archive

Homo Oeconomicus is a quarterly peer-reviewed academic journal covering studies in classical and neoclassical economics, public and social choice theory, law and economics, and philosophy of economics. It was established in 1983 as an occasional series concerned with aspects of the Homo economicus concept. The founding editor-in-chief was Manfred J. Holler (University of Hamburg). The current editors-in-chief are Manfred J. Holler (University of Hamburg), John Hudson (University of Bath), Hartmut Kliemt (Frankfurt School of Finance & Management), and Martin Leroch (University of Mainz). Originally published in German, all articles have been in English since 1998. The mixture of German and English articles deterred some subscribers and subscriptions picked up after the journal stopped accepting German language submissions.
