= Walter Eucken Institut =

Liberal think tank

Coordinates: 47°59′20.09″N 7°50′39.78″E

The Walter Eucken Institut is a German ordo-liberal economic think tank based in Freiburg im Breisgau, Baden-Württemberg, Germany.

The institute was founded in 1954, four years after the death of economist Walter Eucken, by a number of his friends and pupils. The institute's creation was supported by Ludwig Erhard, then Secretary of Economic Affairs and later Chancellor of West Germany. Honorary Presidents have included Nobel laureates Friedrich Hayek and James M. Buchanan.

Since September 2010, the institute is directed by Lars Feld.

The Walter Eucken Institute's research interest is constitutional and institutional questions in economics and social sciences, including preserving and developing a free market order, classical liberal ideas and their institutional realisation, and the economic constitution of the European Union.
