= Peter Egger =

Austrian economist

Peter H. Egger (born 1969) is an Austrian economist who currently works as Professor of Applied Economics at the ETH Zurich. His research areas are industrial economics, innovation, and international competition. In 2011, he was awarded the Gossen Prize for his contributions to economic research.

== Early life and education ==
Peter H. Egger was born in 1969 in Steyr, Austria.

He earned a master's degree and Ph.D. in economics from the University of Linz in 1996 and 2001. During his studies, he worked as a researcher at the Vienna Institute for Comparative Economic Studies (1996–97) and at the Austrian Institute of Economic Research (1997-2001).

== Career ==
In 2001, he also habilitated at the University of Innsbruck, where he then began working as assistant professor (2001–02) and later as associate professor (2002–04). After a brief visiting appointment at the University of Notre Dame (2003–04), he became Professor of Economics at LMU Munich (2004–09), where he intermittently led the ifo Institute's Department of Environmental, Regional and Transport Economics (2004–08) and Department of Foreign Direct Investment and International Trade (2008–09).

Since 2009, Egger has been Professor of Applied Economics at the Konjunkturforschungsstelle (KOF) - the Swiss Institute for Business Cycle Research - of the ETH Zurich, where he leads the Division "Structural Change and Innovation". In addition to his academic positions, Egger maintains affiliations with the Centre for Economic Policy Research (CEPR), CESifo, and the Austrian Institute of Economic Research (WIFO).

== Research ==
Egger's research focuses on applied and theoretical panel econometrics, international and regional economics, industrial organization and multinational firms.

According to IDEAS/RePEc in 2018, Egger is in the top 1% of economists ranked by research output.

== Selected publications ==
- Egger, P., Pirotte, A, Titi, C. (2023). International investment agreements and foreign direct investment: A survey. The World Economy 46(6), pp. 1524-1565.
- Egger, P., Strecker N. M., Zoller-Rydzek, B. (2019). Estimating bargaining-related tax advantages of multinational firms. Journal of International Economics 122, pp. 103-258.
- Becker, S.O., Egger, P.H. (2013). Endogenous product versus process innovation and a firm's propensity to export. Empirical Economics, 44(1), pp. 329–354.
- Becker, S.O., Egger, P.H., Von Ehrlich, M. (2012). Too much of a good thing? On the growth effects of the EU's regional policy. European Economic Review, 56(4), pp. 648–668.
- Egger, P. et al. (2011). The trade effects of endogenous preferential trade agreements. American Economic Journal: Economic Policy, 3(3), pp. 113–143.
- Becker, S.O., Egger, P.H., Von Ehrlich, M. (2010). Going NUTS: The effect of EU Structural Funds on regional performance. Journal of Public Economics, 94(9-10), pp. 578–590.
- Egger, H., Egger, P., Greenaway, D. (2008). The trade structure effects of endogenous regional trade agreements. Journal of International Economics, 74(2), pp. 278–298.
- Egger, P., Larch, M. (2008). Interdependent preferential trade agreement memberships: An empirical analysis. Journal of International Economics, 76(2), pp. 384–399.
- Baltagi, B.H., Egger, P., Pfaffermayr, M. (2007). Estimating models of complex FDI: Are there third-country effects? Journal of Econometrics, 140(1), pp. 260–281.
- Bergstrand, J.H., Egger, P. (2007). A knowledge-and-physical-capital model of international trade flows, foreign direct investment, and multinational enterprises. Journal of International Economics, 73(2), pp. 278–308.
- Egger, P., Egger, H. (2006). International outsourcing and the productivity of low-skilled labor in the EU. Economic Inquiry, 44(1), pp. 98–108.
- Egger, P., Winner, H. (2005). Evidence on corruption as an incentive for foreign direct investment. European Journal of Political Economy, 21(4), pp. 932–952.
- Egger, P., Pfaffermayr, M. (2004). The impact of bilateral investment treaties on foreign direct investment. Journal of Comparative Economics, 32(4), pp. 788–804.
- Egger, P., Pfaffermayr, M. (2003). The proper panel econometric specification of the gravity equation: A three-way model with bilateral interaction effects. Empirical Economics, 28(3), pp. 571–580.
- Baltagi, B.H., Egger, P., Pfaffermayr, M. (2003). A generalized design for bilateral flow models. Economics Letters, 80(3), pp. 391–397.
- Egger, P. (2002). An econometric view on the estimation of gravity models and the calculation of trade potentials. World Economy, 25(2), pp. 297–312.
- Egger, P. (2000). A note on the proper econometric specification of the gravity equation. Economics Letters, 66(1), pp. 25–31.
- Egger, P., Pfaffermayr, M. (2004). Distance, trade and FDI: A Hausman-Taylor SUR approach.
- Egger, H., Egger, P. (2003). Outsourcing and skill-specific employment in a small economy: Austria after the fall of the Iron Curtain. Oxford Economic Papers, 55(4), pp. 625–643.
- Baltagi, B.H., Egger, P., Pfaffermayr, M. (2008). Estimating regional trade agreement effects on FDI in an interdependent world. Journal of Econometrics, 145(1-2), pp. 194–208.
- Egger, P., Winner, H. (2006). How corruption influences foreign direct investment: A panel data study. Economic Development and Cultural Change, 54(2), pp. 459–486.
- Breuss, F., Egger, P. (1999). How reliable are estimations of East-West trade potentials based on cross-section gravity analyses? Empirica, 26(2), pp. 81–94.
