= Hans-Werner Sinn =

German economist

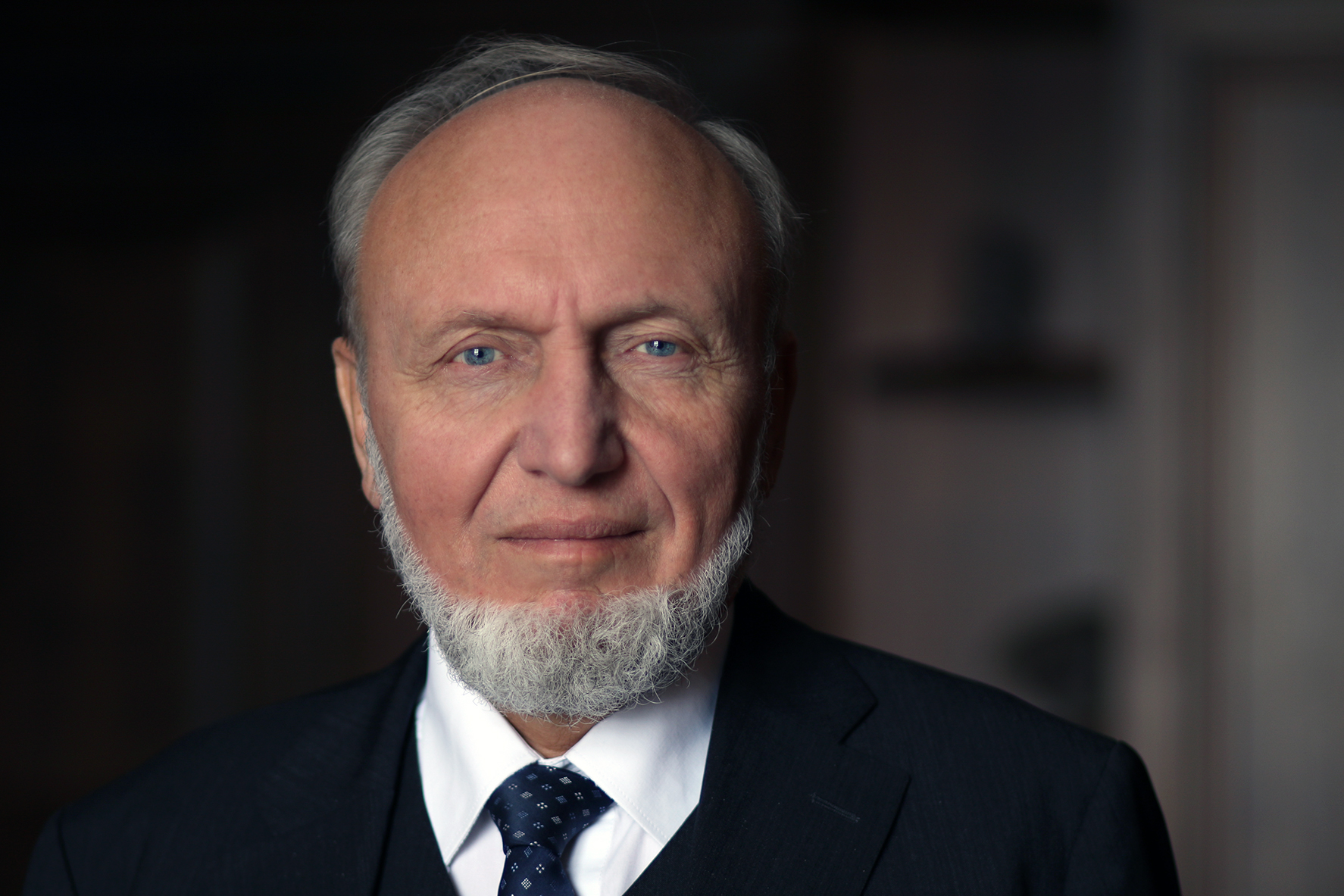
- Sinn in 2025
- Born: 7 March 1948 (age 78); Brake, North Rhine-Westphalia

Academic background
- Education: University of Mannheim; University of Münster

Academic work
- Discipline: Public Finance
- School or tradition: Neoclassical economics; New Neoclassical Synthesis
- Institutions: Ifo Institute for Economic Research
- Website: Information at IDEAS / RePEc

Hans-Werner Sinn (born 7 March 1948) is a German economist who served as President of the Ifo Institute for Economic Research from 1999 to 2016. He currently serves on the German ministry of economy's advisory council. He is Professor Emeritus of Economics and Public Finance at LMU Munich.

== Education and career ==
After studying economics at the University of Münster from 1967 to 1972 and receiving his doctorate from the University of Mannheim in 1978, Sinn was awarded the venia legendi in 1983, also from the University of Mannheim.

Since 1984 Sinn has been full professor in the faculty of economics at LMU Munich, first holding the chair for economics and insurance, and from 1994 the chair for economics and public finance. During leaves of absence from the University of Mannheim and LMU Munich, he held visiting professorships (from 1978 to 1979 and from 1984 to 1985) at the University of Western Ontario in Canada. During sabbaticals he was also visiting researcher at the London School of Economics, as well as at the University of Bergen, Stanford University, Princeton University, and the Hebrew University of Jerusalem. The Otto von Guericke University Magdeburg, the University of Helsinki, the HHL Leipzig Graduate School of Management and the Prague University of Economics and Business have all awarded him honorary doctorates. Since 1988, he has been honorary professor of the University of Vienna, where he has given many lectures, and since 2017, he has been "permanent guest professor" at the University of Lucerne, Switzerland. In 2008 he was knighted with the Bavarian Maximilian Order for Science and Art, and in 2013, he was awarded the Ludwig Erhard Prize by the Ludwig-Erhard Foundation. From 1 February 1999 to 31 March 2016, Sinn was president of the Ifo Institute for Economic Research. The Leibniz Association, the umbrella organization for Germany's federally funded research institutions, extolled his turnaround of Ifo after having taken over the presidency at a highly critical juncture in the institute's history, bringing it back to a level of "very good, in some cases even excellent, research output" and turning it into "one of Europe's leading economic research institutes". In 2006 he became president of the International Institute of Public Finance, a position he held until 2009. From 1997 to 2000 Sinn headed the Verein für Socialpolitik, the association of German-speaking economists. He reformed the Verein für Socialpolitik and actively promoted the internationalization of economic science in the German-speaking countries. During his presidency he founded two journals – the German Economic Review and the Perspektiven der Wirtschaftspolitik -, initiated the Gossen prize to honor young economists that publish internationally and created a scholarship programme to financially support international conference presentations of young economists.

In 1991 he founded the Center for Economic Studies at LMU Munich. It was intended to serve as a visitors' center for academic economists invited from all over the world for research and teaching in Munich. On the basis of CES he founded the first German Graduate Programme in Economics, which has been compulsory for all Ph.D. students of the faculty. Since 1999, when he became president of the Ifo Institute, CES and the Ifo Institute have met under an umbrella organisation, the CESifo Group, to build bridges between theoretical and empirical economic investigation and between researchers from all over the world. He founded the international CESifo Research Network. With its more than 1000 Professors of Economics from 63 countries it is among the largest international research networks of this kind. It publishes more than 500 research reports and organizes around 25 conferences per year. The Dutch Economist and former State Secretary of Education, Science and Culture of the Netherlands Rick van Ploeg honored Sinn's contribution to strengthening Economics as a subject in Germany and continental Europe.

Sinn is fellow of the National Bureau of Economic Research in Cambridge, Massachusetts, and was the first German-speaking economist to deliver the Yrjö Jahnsson Lectures in Helsinki (1999) and the Tinbergen Lectures in Amsterdam (2004).

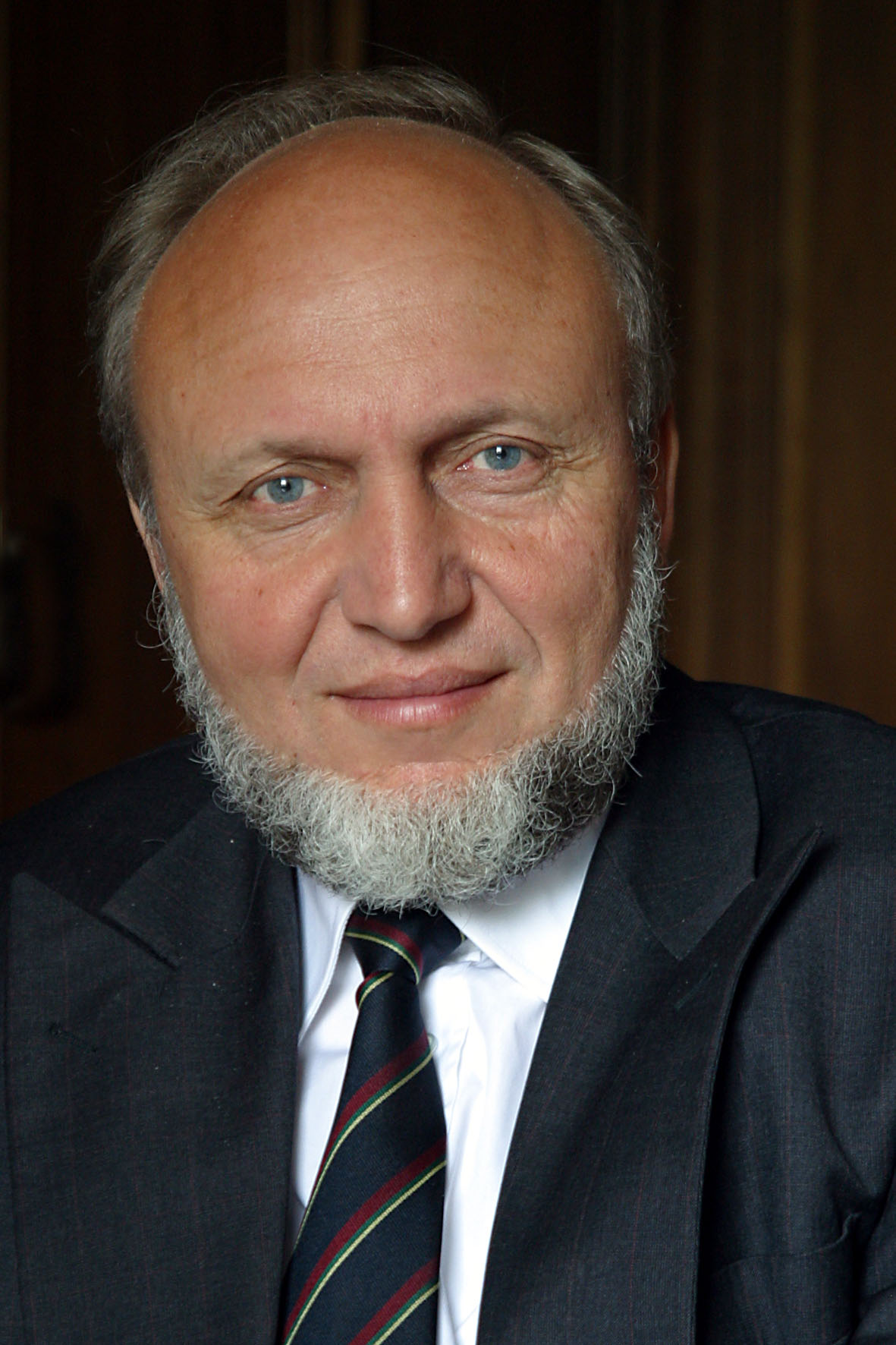
Hans-Werner Sinn

Sinn topped a ranking of German economist provided by the Frankfurter Allgemeine Zeitung (FAZ) in 2013, 2014 and 2015. The FAZ's ranking named him "Germany's most influential economist of 2014", arguing that "no other economics researcher in Germany has such a high profile in the media and politics and is also active in research." Since his retirement in 2016 he has occupied the second rank. In the 2006 Handelsblatt ranking of German economists (Ökonomen-Ranking VWL), based on cross citations of SSCI papers in SSCI journals, Sinn ranked fourth. In a study by Ursprung and Zimmer, based on SSCI citations per author of the full oeuvre, Sinn ranked second of all German economists, after Nobel laureate Reinhard Selten. In the RePEc database he is the German economist most frequently quoted in academic works. In a survey conducted by the Financial Times Deutschland among more than 550 German economic experts, Sinn was one of the two professors in Germany (the other was Herbert Giersch) to attract a large following of academic pupils, and in terms of political influence he ranked only behind Bert Rürup at the top of the list of German professors. The British newspaper The Independent nominated him as one of the "ten people who changed the world" in 2011. In its latest evaluation of the Ifo Institute, the Leibniz Association praised Sinn as one of "Germany's most renowned economists, who constantly succeeds in bringing the most varied economic issues to public debate".

Sinn has published 85 scholarly articles in refereed journals including the American Economic Review, the Quarterly Journal of Economics, the Journal of Monetary Economics and the Journal of Public Economics. He wrote 36 scholarly articles for refereed conference volumes, 23 scholarly comments for refereed journals and conference volumes, and about 200 academic policy papers in various outlets. He authored 11 refereed scholarly monographs and 10 non-refereed scholarly monographs. In addition, he has written numerous newspaper articles and given many interviews. Moreover, he has made longer contributions for radio and television and has made many talk-show appearances. More than twenty articles on his person have been published in German and foreign newspapers. His 2003 book "Ist Deutschland noch zu retten?" has stimulated policy discussion in Germany and influenced the Agenda 2010 reforms. With more than 100,000 copies in print, the book is one of the most popular public policy monographs in recent history. It has also been published in English as "Can Germany be Saved?" by MIT Press in 2007. As a reaction to the criticism of his book in the media, Sinn wrote a follow-up book in 2005, "Die Basarökonomie". His book the Green Paradox and his prior research on this topic triggered a worldwide debate, as did Sinn's research on TARGET2 balances, which is summarised in his book Die Target Falle. Sinn's book Casino Capitalism was named as one of the 50 best economics books of all time by Handelsblatt. His book "The Euro Trap: On Bursting Bubbles, Budgets, and Beliefs", published by Oxford University Press in 2014, reviews the effects of the adoption of the euro as a common currency and, in particular, the policy measures undertaken to combat the euro crisis. The book was hailed as "perhaps the most important scholarly book on the euro in at least a decade" by Kenneth Rogoff. He is also a regular contributor to Project Syndicate since 2002.

Since 1989 Sinn has served on the Advisory Council of the German Ministry of Economics, and represented the Free State of Bavaria on the Board of Supervisors of HypoVereinsbank for ten years.

In February 2018 his autobiography entitled "Auf der Suche nach der Wahrheit" ("In Search of the Truth") was published in German language on the occasion of his 70th birthday.

Sinn lives with his wife near Munich. They have three adult children.

== Research ==
With the exception of his diploma dissertation, also published in a journal, on the Marxian Law of the tendencial decline of the rate of profit, Sinn dealt in his early years particularly with economic risk theory. He made a name for himself with his dissertation "Ökonomische Entscheidungen bei Ungewissheit" (1980), published in English as "Economic Decisions under Uncertainty" (1983), with numerous spin-off articles. Subsequent work focused on the axiomatic basis of mean-variance analysis, on the foundation of the principle of insufficient reason, on the psychological foundation of risk preference functions and on the analysis of risk decisions under limited liability, which he subsequently developed into a theory of bank regulation in his Yrjö Jahnsson Lectures, "The New Systems Competition". In 2003, in the journal FinanzArchiv, he touched off an academic debate on banking regulation in which he was criticised by market-oriented economists for his favouring of stronger banking regulation to prevent excessive risk-taking. With his dissertation in 1977 on excess risk propensity under liability restrictions, Sinn, in the opinion of Martin Hellwig, preceded the pioneering analysis of Stiglitz and Weiss of 1981. His work in this area was again published as a reprint volume in 2008. On the basis of his research on risk theory, Sinn developed his influential theory of the insurer state, in which he interpreted the redistributing activity of the state via the tax-transfer system as insurance protection, showing that this activity can have a favourable influence on people's willingness to take productive risks. His work on the Theory of the Welfare State in 1995 is considered an important contribution on the legitimacy of state redistribution activity.

Sinn has published numerous studies on the theory of economic cycles, environmental economics, foreign trade issues, including ones on the so-called asset approach and on the micro foundations of a model of temporary general equilibrium.

Problems of longer-term economic growth were also on his research agenda. Sinn was the first economist to formulate the central-planning model of economic growth in the tradition of Robert Solow as a general equilibrium model with decentrally optimizing agents and market clearing conditions in an article published in German in 1980 and two years later in English, and before similar work by Chamley in 1981 and Abel and Blanchard in 1983.

His study on the stimulating effects of accelerated depreciation and the various components of capital income taxation on intertemporal, international, and intersectoral allocation is still considered one of the standard works in this field.

Sinn contributed to the discussion on German pension reform with his article "Pension Reform and Demographic Crisis. Why a Funded System is Needed and Why it is Not Needed" published in 2000. Here, with the help of present-value equivalents, he showed that the low returns from statutory pension insurance based on the pay-as-you-go method has only an apparent efficiency disadvantage in comparison to a capitally funded procedure. This finding was further developed in a number of subsequent studies.

Recently Sinn has turned to the problem of the global warming in an article "Public Policies against Global Warming" and in his book "Das grüne Paradoxon" (the English version, The Green Paradox, was published by MIT Press in 2012). In these studies Sinn developed a supply-side theory of climate change by linking climate-theory approaches with the theory of exhaustible natural resources. His "green paradox" states that environmental policies that promote substitute technologies over time with increasing intensity (and in the process lower the prices for fossil fuels relative to the values they otherwise would have obtained) will induce the resource suppliers to accelerate extraction, thus contributing to global warming.

== Economic policy positions ==
In 2005 he was one of the first German economists to sign the "Hamburger Appell", which argued for fundamental supply-side reforms and rejected demand-oriented concepts of economic policy. At the same time Sinn employs the instruments of Keynesian demand theory for his analyses of economic activity. With his studies on pension insurance, in which he argued for partial capital funding, as well as by providing direct advice to the Federal Ministry of Labour and Social Affairs (through CES, his university institute) and by contributing to an expertise on pensions for the Ministry of Economics, Sinn had a hand in the introduction of the "Riester-Rente", a privately financed pension scheme support by the German government in the form of grants and tax deductions.

In 2003 he saw Germany's attractiveness as an investment location endangered by too high labour costs and called for structural reforms of the labour market. These include escape clauses for collective wage agreements, the abolition of dismissal protection laws and longer working hours without wage compensation. He has also criticised the employment-restricting effects of the German wage replacement system. As an alternative he developed in 2002 the model of activating social welfare. His policy recommendations influenced the Agenda 2010 reforms. According to Prof. Wolfgang Wiegard, then chairman of the Council of Economic Advisors, his work was the blueprint for the Agenda 2010 reforms.

Sinn has called the German economy a "bazaar economy" because the share of input from abroad in German industrial production is on the increase. At the same time he points out that this is not to be equated with a breaking off of value added in exports. Instead Germany has decimated its domestic sector via excessive wage increases and has driven excess amounts of capital and skilled labour into the labour and knowledge-intensive export sectors, where fewer less-skilled workers can be employed as have been set free in the domestic sectors. At the expense of the domestic sectors, Germany has inflated value added in exports too strongly and at the same time has placed too much emphasis on the final stages of production. As a result, a pathological export boom occurred.

The world economic crisis is traced back by Sinn to abuse of liability limitation by American investment banks. The lack of capital reserve requirements gave these banks the possibility to pursue their business with inadequate capital reserves and encouraged them to gamble. In addition the lack of personal liability for homeowners created in a similar way an exaggerated willingness to take risks and thus caused the United States housing bubble. To correct this situation Sinn has called for considerably higher capital reserve requirements, the balancing of offshore business and a return to the accounting principle of the lower of cost of the German Commercial Code (HGB).

Against the background of the Great Recession, Sinn advocates a return to the tradition of ordoliberalism and of ordoliberal economists like Walter Eucken, Alfred Müller-Armack, Alexander Rüstow, and Ludwig Erhard, who argued a strong state should provide a framework or economic order inside which market forces and free market competition can develop. Markets do not regulate themselves (Selbstregulierung), but are capable of self-controlled processes (Selbststeuerung) inside an institutional framework provided by the state.

Sinn accuses the Greens of pursuing environmental protection policies with unsuitable means and of ignoring the economic laws of the European emissions trading system as well as the worldwide market for fossil fuel. In his book, The Green Paradox, he argues for including all countries of the world in a post-Kyoto, joint emissions trading system. He also favours employing a withholding tax on the yields of financial investments to curb the desire of the resource providers to extract more fossil fuels.

During the 10th Munich Economic Summit in May 2011, Sinn alleged that the ECB had been conducting what he termed a "stealth bailout" of Greece, Ireland, Portugal and Spain for the past three years, financing capital flight and/or current account deficits by allowing them to accumulate massive liabilities in their TARGET2 accounts. He subsequently published his views in the press and specialized websites, followed by a working paper that analyzed the issue in detail. He also discussed Germany's capital exports since the introduction of the euro and the prospects such exports could face if the euro crisis continues and leads to the introduction of Eurobonds, which he opposes. While drawing much acclaim for his focusing on Target2 imbalances, the conclusions he draws have been fiercely opposed by Karl Whelan. Whelan in turn was accused by Frank Westermann of seriously misquoting Sinn, while repeating basically Sinn's own findings with his own words.

== Controversy ==
In July 2012, Sinn was one of the eventually more than 270 signatories of an open letter written by Walter Krämer of the Technical University of Dortmund against Chancellor Angela Merkel's Brussels agreement on direct recapitalization for ailing European banks. Economics professors Frank Heinemann of Berlin and Gerhard Illing of Munich drafted a public answer, arguing that a "banking union" in the sense of common supervision was, in fact, critical to saving the euro, but they also objected to bank recapitalisation using the taxpayers' money. This letter also attracted more than 200 signatories from the banking and the academic communities. The "momentous tiff", as The Economist dubbed it, has in the meantime become more nuanced, with Krämer and Sinn publishing a more muted version in which they endorsed a banking union based on the bail-in principle. Sinn joined Heinemann and Krämer in publishing a joint appeal on the issue in Plenum der Ökonomen, an internet forum of German professional economists.

== Public influence ==
According to a poll conducted jointly by the Financial Times Deutschland and the Verein für Socialpolitik (the German economics association) among 550 German economics experts in 2006, "only two representatives of our profession exert an appreciable influence on policymaking: Bert Rürup and Hans-Werner Sinn". A study in 2007 placed Sinn, in terms of number of citations in scientific journals, second to German Nobel laureate Reinhard Selten. The British newspaper The Independent named Sinn among the ten most important people who changed the world in 2011.

The German Business weekly WirtschaftsWoche ranked Sinn in 2011 as number 62 among the 100 most powerful people in Germany, and placed him in the No. 1 position among the "Most Important Economists" in the country. In 2012, he was included in the 50 Most Influential list of Bloomberg Markets Magazine. In 2013, the Frankfurter Allgemeine Zeitung placed Sinn first on their list of economist with most political influence. According to an inquiry of the German magazine Cicero published in January 2017, Sinn occupies the 4th rang in a list of the most important German intellectuals with respect to their influence on the public dialogue in the past ten years.

== Affiliations ==
- President of the International Institute of Public Finance (2006–2009)
- European Economic Advisory Group at CESifo (since 2001)
- North Rhine-Westphalian Academy of Sciences (since 2001)
- Bavarian Academy of Sciences, historical-philosophical division (since 1996)
- National Bureau of Economic Research (NBER), Cambridge, Massachusetts, Research Associate
- Member of the Advisory Council of the German Ministry of Economics (since 1989)

== Awards ==
- Karl-Hermann-Flach-Prize, Karl-Hermann-Flach Foundation (April 2022)
- Honorary Doctorate, University of Lucerne, Lucerne (November 2021)
- Friedrich-List-Medal in gold, Federal Association of German Business Academics and Economists (bdvb) (2017)
- Honorary Doctorate, University of Economics, Prague (February 2017)
- Professor of the year 2015, German Association of University Professors and Lecturers (Deutscher Hochschulverband)
- Honorary Doctorate, HHL Leipzig Graduate School of Management (Juli 2013)
- Honorary Doctorate, University of Helsinki (2011)
- Gustav Stolper Prize of Verein für Socialpolitik (2008)
- Europe Prize of University of Maastricht (2008)
- Bavarian Maximilian Order for Science and Art (2008)
- The World Economy Annual Lecture, University of Nottingham (2005)
- German Federal Cross of Merit, first class (2005)
- CORINE International Book Prize (2004)
- Tinbergen Lectures, Royal Netherlands Economic Association (2004)
- Economics Book Prize of the Financial Times Deutschland and getAbstract AG (2003)
- Honorary Award of the Wirtschaftsbeirates der Union e. V. (2003)
- Stevenson Lectures on Citizenship, University of Glasgow (2000)
- Distinguished Scholar, Atlantic Economic Society (2000)
- German Federal Cross of Merit, on ribbon, (1999)
- Yrjö Jahnsson Lectures, University of Helsinki (1999)
- Honorary doctorate (Dr. rer. pol. h.c.), University of Magdeburg (1999)
- Special Prize of the Herbert Quandt Foundation (1997)
- Honorary Professorship, University of Vienna (1988)
- First Prize of the University of Mannheim for Habilitation dissertation (1984, Schitag Foundation)
- First Prize of the University of Mannheim for doctoral dissertation (1979, Rheinische Hypothekenbank Foundation)
- Top 500 Economists in the World according to IDEAS/RePEc

== Selected publications ==
- Sinn, Hans-Werner (1980). "A Rehabilitation of the Principle of Insufficient Reason". Quarterly Journal of Economics. 94 (3): 493–506. doi:10.2307/1884581. JSTOR 1884581. S2CID 223149.
- Sinn, Hans-Werner (1981). "Stock–dependent Extraction Costs and the Technological Efficiency of Resource Depletion". Zeitschrift für Wirtschafts– und Sozialwissenschaften. 101: 507–517.
- Sinn, Hans-Werner (1983). Economic Decisions under Uncertainty. Amsterdam: North-Holland. ISBN 978-0-444-86387-4.
- Sinn, Hans-Werner (1984). "Common Property Resources, Storage Facilities and Ownership Structures: A Cournot Model of the Oil Market". Economica. 51 (203): 235–252. doi:10.2307/2554543. JSTOR 2554543. S2CID 154923340.
- Hans-Werner Sinn. (1987). Capital Income Taxation and Resource Allocation. Amsterdam: North Holland. ISBN 978-0-444-70208-1.
- Howitt; Howitt, P. (1989). "Gradual Reforms of Capital Income Taxation". American Economic Review. 79 (1). The American Economic Review, Vol. 79, No. 1: 106–124. JSTOR 1804777.
- Sinn, Gerlinde and Hans-Werner Sinn; translated by Juli Irving-Lessmann.; Sinn, Gerlinde (1992). Jumpstart. The Economic Unification of Germany. Cambridge, Massachusetts: MIT Press. ISBN 978-0-262-19327-6.
- Sinn, Hans-Werner (1995). "A Theory of the Welfare State". Scandinavian Journal of Economics. 97 (4): 495–526. doi:10.2307/3440540. JSTOR 3440540. S2CID 153611394.
- Sinn, Hans-Werner (February 1999). "Pension Reform and Demographic Crisis: Why a Funded System is Needed and Why it is not Needed" (PDF). CESifo Working Paper Series (195).
- Sinn, Hans-Werner (1997). "The Selection Principle and Market Failure in Systems Competition". Journal of Public Economics. 66 (2): 247–274. doi:10.1016/S0047-2727(97)00043-1.
- Sinn, Hans-Werner (2003). The New Systems Competition. Yrjö Jahnsson Lectures. Oxford: Basil Blackwell. ISBN 978-0-631-21952-1.
- Sinn, Hans-Werner (2004). "The Pay–as–you–go Pension System as a Fertility Insurance and Enforcement Device" (PDF). Journal of Public Economics. 88 (7–8): 1335–1357. doi:10.1016/S0047-2727(03)00015-X. S2CID 19492182.
- Sinn, Hans-Werner (2005). Die Basar–Ökonomie. Berlin: Econ. ISBN 978-3-430-18536-3.
- Sinn, Hans-Werner (2007). Can Germany Be Saved? The Malaise of the World's First Welfare State. Cambridge, Massachusetts: MIT Press. ISBN 978-0-262-19558-4.
- Sinn, Hans-Werner (2008). Das grüne Paradoxon: Plädoyer für eine illusionsfreie Klimapolitik. Berlin: Econ. ISBN 978-3-430-20062-2.
  - Sinn, Hans Werner (2020 new edition). Das grüne Paradoxon: Plädoyer für eine illusionsfreie Klimapolitik. Weltbuch Verlag, Dresden, ISBN 978-3-906212-57-9.
- Sinn, Hans-Werner (2008). Risk Taking, Limited Liability, and the Banking Crisis. Selected Reprints. Munich: Ifo Institute. ISBN 978-3-88512-482-5.
- Sinn, Hans-Werner (2009). Kasino-Kapitalismus. Wie es zur Finanzkrise kam, und was jetzt zu tun ist. Berlin: Econ. ISBN 978-3-430-20084-4.
- Sinn, Hans-Werner (2010). Casino Capitalism. How the Financial Crisis Came about and What Needs to Be Done Now. Oxford: Oxford University Press. p. 400. ISBN 978-0-19-958827-5.
- Sinn, Hans-Werner (2012). The Green Paradox (Revised and updated translation of "Das Grüne Paradoxon" ed.). Cambridge, Mass.: MIT Press. ISBN 978-0-262-01668-1.
- Sinn, Hans-Werner (2014). The Euro Trap. On Bursting Bubbles, Budgets, and Beliefs. Oxford: Oxford University Press. p. 416. ISBN 978-0-19-870213-9.
- Sinn, Hans-Werner (2017). "Buffering volatility: A study on the limits of Germany's energy revolution" (PDF). European Economic Review. 99: 130–150. doi:10.1016/j.euroecorev.2017.05.007. S2CID 157663409.
- Sinn, Hans Werner (2016). Der Schwarze Juni: Brexit, Flüchtlingswelle, Euro-Desaster - Wie die Neugründung Europas gelingt, Herder, München 2016, ISBN 978-3-451-37745-7.
- Sinn, Hans Werner (2018). Auf der Suche nach der Wahrheit, Herder: München, p. 672. ISBN 978-3-451-34783-2.
- Sinn, Hans Werner (2020). Der Corona-Schock. Wie die Wirtschaft überlebt. Herder Verlag, 2020, ISBN 978-3-451-38893-4.
- Sinn, Hans Werner (2020).The Economics of Target Balances: From. Lehman to Corona, Palgrave Macmillan, London, November 2020, ISBN 978-3-030-50169-3.
- Sinn, Hans Werner (2021). Die wundersame Geldvermehrung. Staatsverschuldung, Negativzinsen, Inflation. Herder Verlag, 2021, ISBN 978-3-451-39127-9.
- Sinn, Hans Werner (2025). Trump, Putin und die Vereinigten Staaten von Europa. Herder Verlag, 2025, ISBN 978-3-451-03652-1.
