= German Economic Review =

- Discipline: Economics
- Language: English
- Edited by: Almut Balleer, Jesus Crespo-Cuaresma, Peter Egger, Mario Larch, Jean-Marie Lozachmeur, Aderonke Osikominu, Georg Wamser, Christine Zulehner

Publication details
- History: 2000–present
- Publisher: John Wiley & Sons on behalf of the Verein für Socialpolitik
- Frequency: Quarterly
- Impact factor: 0.860 (2020)

Standard abbreviations
- ISO 4: Ger. Econ. Rev.

Indexing
- ISSN: 1465-6485 (print); 1468-0475 (web)
- LCCN: 00235260
- OCLC no.: 231868508

Links
- Journal homepage; Online access; Online archive

The German Economic Review is a peer-reviewed academic journal of economics published quarterly by John Wiley & Sons on behalf of the Verein für Socialpolitik, of which it is the official English language journal. It was re-established in 2000. It was briefly published in the 1970s.

The current editors-in-chief are Almut Balleer, Jesus Crespo-Cuaresma, Peter Egger, Mario Larch, Jean-Marie Lozachmeur, Aderonke Osikominu, Georg Wamser, and Christine Zulehner.

According to the Journal Citation Reports, the journal has a 2020 impact factor of 0.860, ranking it 275th out of 373 journals in the category "Economics".

== See also ==
- List of economics journals
- List of political science journals
