= Stefano DellaVigna =

Italian economist (born 1973)

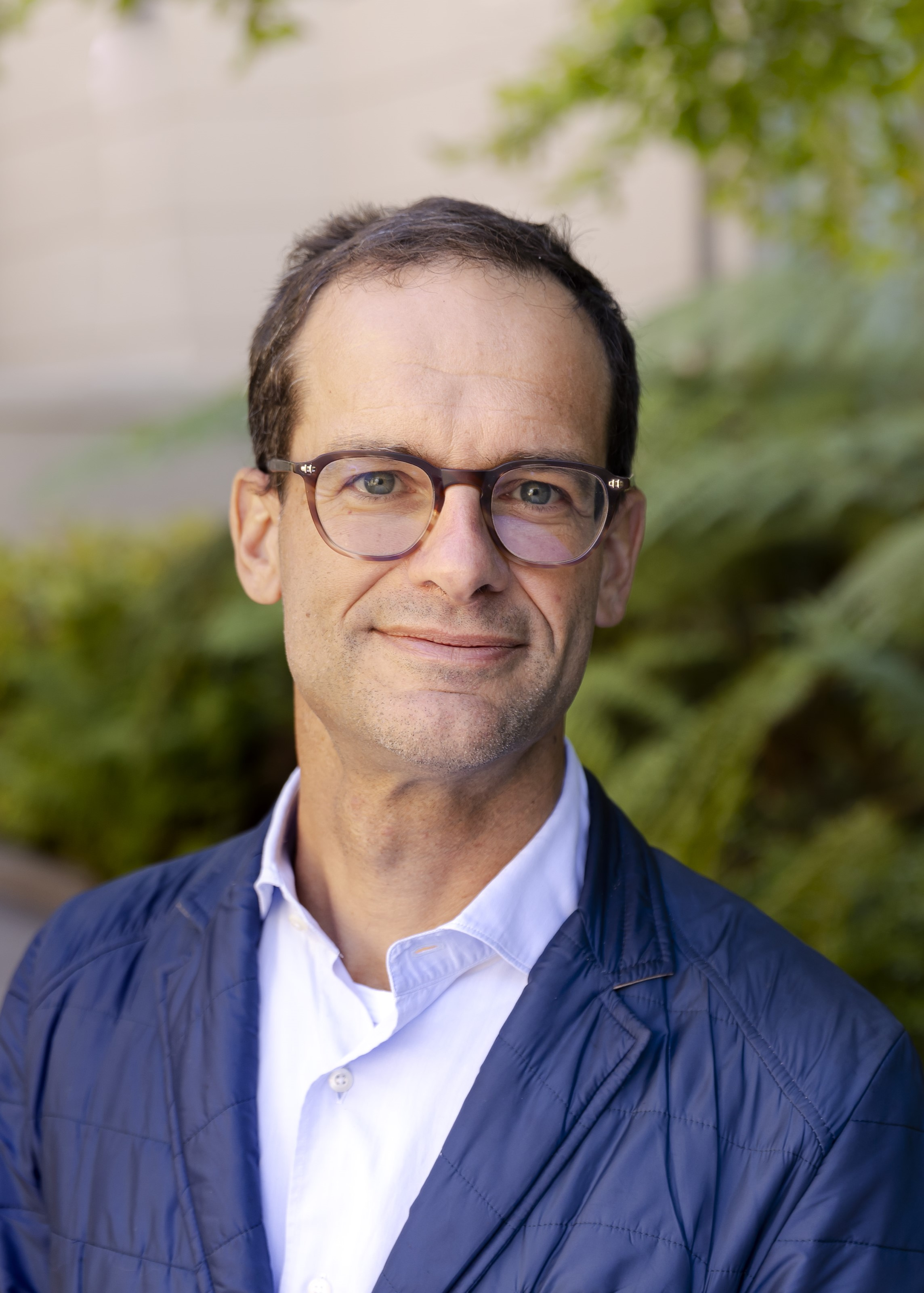
- Born: 19 June 1973 (age 53); Como, Italy
- Spouse: Ulrike Malmendier

Academic background
- Education: Bocconi University (laurea, 1997); Harvard University (M.A., 2000; Ph.D., 2002)
- Doctoral advisor: David Laibson, Lawrence F. Katz

Academic work
- Discipline: Behavioral Economics
- Institutions: University of California, Berkeley
- Notable students: Diane Alexander, Mira Frick, Simon Jäger, Anne Karing, Woojin Kim, Devin Pope, Gautam Rao, Maya Rossin-Slater, Justin Sydnor, David Yang
- Website: sdellavi.com; Information at IDEAS / RePEc

Stefano DellaVigna (born 19 June 1973) is an Italian economist known for his work in behavioral and applied economics. He joined the faculty at the University of California, Berkeley in 2002, after receiving his Ph.D. from Harvard University. He is the Daniel E. Koshland Sr. Distinguished Professor of Economics and Professor of Business Administration at the University of California, Berkeley, and has served as chair of the Department of Economics since 2025. He has also been elected as a Fellow of the American Academy of Arts and Sciences, the Econometric Society, and the Alfred P. Sloan Foundation. He is also the winner of multiple Distinguished Teaching Awards and a Distinguished Undergraduate Research Mentoring Award. He has published several articles in leading international journals such as the Quarterly Journal of Economics, the Journal of Political Economy, and the American Economic Review. He served as a co-editor of the American Economic Review from 2017 to 2023. He was also an Editor of the Handbook of Behavioral Economics, first published in 2018.

== Early life and career ==
DellaVigna was born in Como, Italy, in 1973, where he spent his early childhood. He graduated from Liceo Volta High School in 1992. He received a Bachelor's degree in Economics, Summa Cum Laude, from Bocconi University in Milan in 1997, with Marco Li Calzi as his thesis advisor, after spending a quarter visiting UCLA in 1996.

He moved to the United States, where he has since resided, in 1997 for doctoral studies in Economics at Harvard University. He earned Masters and Ph.D. degrees, both in Economics, from Harvard University in 2000 and 2002, respectively. His primary dissertation advisors were David Laibson and Lawrence Katz.

He joined the faculty at the University of California, Berkeley, as an Assistant Professor in 2002. He was tenured in 2008, promoted to Professor in 2012, and named the Daniel E. Koshland Sr. Professor of Economics in 2013. He has also held an appointment at the Haas School of Business since 2014. He has been serving as Department Chair of the Economics Department since 2025.

DellaVigna has served as editor at major economic journals for ten years, first at the Journal of the European Economic Association from 2009 to 2013, then at the American Economic Review from 2017 to 2023. He has held various service positions within the economics profession, including memberships on the 2013 Program Committee, the 2015 AEA Nominating Committee, and the 2023 Econometric Society Winter Meetings Committee.

He has additionally contributed to behavioral economics. He has served as an Editor (with Douglas Bernheim and David Laibson) of the first two volumes of the Handbook of Behavioral Economics in 2018 and 2019. In 2023, he served as a member of the National Academies of Sciences, Engineering, and Medicine committee on Behavioral Economics: Policy Impact and Future Directions. He additionally organized the Russell Sage Foundation Meeting on Behavioral Labor Economics in 2015 and the National Bureau of Economics Research Behavioral Finance Working Group in 2011.

He has also contributed to initiatives in research transparency. Since 2019, he has been a co-principal investigator of the Social Science Prediction Platform, an open-science platform that enables the collection of ex-ante forecasts for social science research. He also serves as a member of the Scientific Advisory Board for the Berkeley Initiative for Transparency in the Social Sciences, an organization committed to encouraging transparency in social science research.

== Research ==
DellaVigna has written over 40 papers across a variety of fields, primarily focusing on behavioral economics, but also with various contributions to political economy, labor economics, and transparency in social science research. As of 2026, his research has received over 25,000 Google Scholar citations.

=== Behavioral economics ===
DellaVigna's work has focused on providing empirical evidence on phenomena in behavioral economics. In the early years of behavioral economics, with the exception of work in behavioral finance and retirement savings, much of the evidence came from laboratory experiments (for example, on prospect theory or on social preferences). DellaVigna's focus has been on presenting empirical evidence from field settings, on wide-ranging topics including unemployment, political behaviors, crime, and charitable giving. His early review of the empirical evidence on behavioral economics, Psychology and Economics: Evidence from the Field, remains one of the most cited reviews of work in the field.

Turning to individual research papers, his research has shed light on the economic impacts of several human behaviors, including self-control, persuasion, and inattention. For example, in Paying Not to Go to the Gym, he showed that several consumers who purchase gym memberships overestimate their gym attendance; they would have saved an average of $700 if they chose to pay per visit rather than purchase a membership. This paper provides evidence on the self-control problem: people intend to attend the gym regularly in the future, but subsequently fail to follow through on those plans. In Does Movie Violence Increase Violent Crime?, he found that violent movies deter almost 1,000 assaults on the average weekend. This occurs because individuals predisposed toward violent behavior are more likely to attend movie theaters when violent films are playing, and thus are less likely to perform alternate activities, including consuming alcohol and/or engaging in violence. In Testing for Altruism and Social Pressure in Charitable Giving, he aimed to determine whether door-to-door giving is motivated more by altruism or by social pressure. He designed an experiment where some households were informed beforehand of an upcoming door-to-door fundraiser. The study found that households receiving advance flyers informing them of the fundraiser were less likely to open the door and donate, indicating that social pressure is an important determinant of door-to-door fundraising.

Some of his more recent work focuses on estimating the impact of nudges. In RCTs to Scale: Comprehensive Evidence from Two Nudge Units, he provides novel evidence on over 100 nudge randomized controlled trials (RCTs) run by two major Nudge Units, showing that nudge interventions have a sizable impact on the targeted outcomes, though five times smaller than the average impact estimated in prior economic literature. In Bottlenecks for Evidence Adoption, DellaVigna shows that several governments do not adopt the results of even successful nudge experiments, largely because of institutional inertia.

=== Political economy ===
Within political economy, DellaVigna has worked on media bias, voter turnout, and evidence adoption, among other topics. The Fox News Effect: Media Bias and Voting analyzed the entry of Fox News in cable markets between 1996 and 2000, finding that in the 2000 Presidential election, the Republican vote share increased by an estimated 0.4 to 0.7 percentage points in towns that broadcast Fox News. In Voting to Tell Others, DellaVigna uses a field experiment involving a door-to-door survey, showing that social image concerns are a primary driver of voter turnout.

=== Labor economics ===
Within labor economics, DellaVigna has studied job search. In Reference-Dependent Job Search: Evidence from Hungary, he finds evidence for reference-dependent job search, implying that newly unemployed individuals search harder for jobs, but they eventually get accustomed to their lower income and thus reduce their search effort. In Evidence on Job Search Models from a Survey of Unemployed Workers in Germany, he similarly finds that unemployed workers in Germany search harder for a job as they approach the expiration of unemployment benefits. In Job Search and Impatience, he finds that workers with greater impatience to find a job searched less intensively and set lower reservation wages (i.e., the minimum wage at which they will accept a job).

=== Research transparency ===
Since 2019, DellaVigna has been a co-principal investigator of the Social Science Prediction Platform, intended to encourage the collection of ex-ante forecasts for social science research. He also serves as a member of the Scientific Advisory Board for the Berkeley Initiative for Transparency in the Social Sciences, an organization committed to encouraging transparency in social science research. His research within the field includes Forecasting Social Science: Evidence from 100 Projects, a paper that uses evidence generated from the SSPP to shed light on the usefulness of social science forecasts, and Predict Science to Improve Science, which outlines how a systematic collection of predictions of research results is helpful.

Within this area, DellaVigna has additionally studied the publication process in economics, including gender biases. In Are the Referees and Editors in Economics Gender Neutral?, he uses a unique data set of anonymized submissions to four top economics journals to study how much female authors are treated differently. He did a parallel analysis of gender differences in awards in economics in Gender Differences in Peer Recognition by Economists.

== Advising ==
DellaVigna is known as a prolific advisor, having advised nearly 50 doctoral students and 100 undergraduate students interested in further doctoral studies from 2004 to 2024. Dissertation Paths: Advisors and Students in the Economics Research Production Function, a 2024 study on advising networks in economics, identified him as among the discipline's most prolific doctoral advisors. His former students include both academic economists, such as Diane Alexander, Mira Frick, Simon Jäger, Anne Karing, Woojin Kim, Devin Pope, Gautam Rao, Maya Rossin-Slater, Justin Sydnor, and David Yang, and industry professionals such as Johannes Hermle, Maxim Massenkoff, and Farhan Zaidi.

== Personal life ==
DellaVigna married Ulrike Malmendier in 2003. They have three sons: Thomas, Lucas, and Alex.
