= Justus Haucap =

German economist

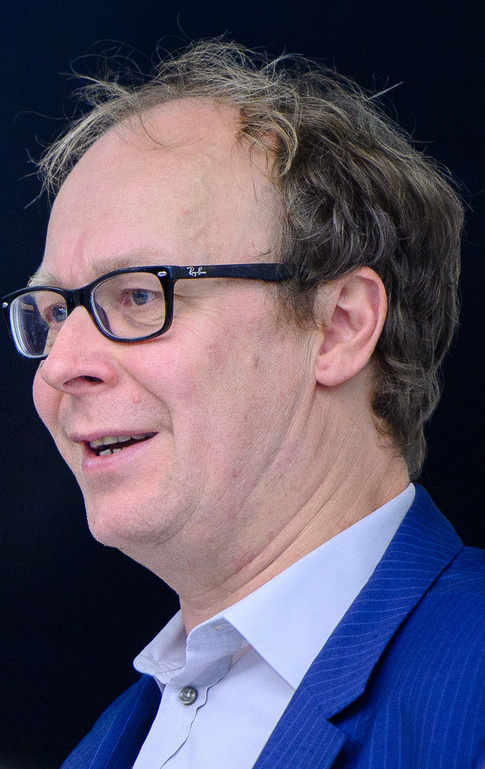
Justus Haucap, 2020

Justus Haucap (born March 24, 1969, in Quakenbrück) is a German economist who currently works as Professor of Economics at the University of Düsseldorf, where he directs the Düsseldorf Institute for Competition Economics (DICE). The focus of his research is on competition and antitrust as well as the regulation of network industries and the digital economy. In 2015, Haucap was awarded the Gustav Stolper Prize for his contributions to competition policy in Germany.

== Early life and education ==
A native of Quakenbrück, Justus Haucap studied economics at the University of Saarland and at the University of Michigan, Ann Arbor, obtaining a diploma and Ph.D. from the former in 1993 and 1997. In 2003, Haucap habilitated at the Helmut Schmidt University with a thesis on the application of economic policy to competition, regulation and institutions.

== Career ==
Haucap worked as Professor for Competition Theory and Policy at the Ruhr University Bochum (2004–07) and later as Professor for Economic Policy at the University of Erlangen-Nuremberg (2007–09). Since 2009, he has been Professor for Competition Theory and Policy at the University of Düsseldorf and Director of the Düsseldorf Institute for Competition Economics (DICE).

In addition to his academic work, Haucap has been a long-term member and chaired the German Monopoly Commission (2006–14), which advises the German government on competition policy. In 2025, Federal Minister for Economic Affairs and Energy Katherina Reiche appointed him as one of her external advisors on macroeconomic policy.

== Research ==
Haucap's research focuses on competition and antitrust as well as the regulation of network industries and the digital economy. According to IDEAS/RePEc, he belongs to the top 2% of economists ranked by research output. Key findings of his research include:

- Firms' innovation incentives are largest when an industry union sets a uniform wage rate for all firms, lower if wages are determined at the firm-level and lowest if one union sets individual wages for all firms, thus suggesting that decentralising unionisation structures or imposing non-discrimination rules on wage-setting could spur innovation (with Christian Wey).
- If the introduction of mobile number portability not only abolishes operator switching costs but also makes consumers unable to distinguish between networks with different termination rates and thus allows operators to increase termination rates, then its net effect on consumers' welfare becomes ambiguous (with Stefan Bühler).

== Other activities ==
- Bruegel, Member of the Scientific Council
- Cologne Institute for Economic Research (IW), Member of the Research Advisory Council
- Herbert Giersch Stiftung, Member of the Advisory Board
- Scientific Institute for Infrastructure und Communications Services (WIK), Member of the Scientific Advisory Board
- North Rhine-Westphalian Academy of Sciences, Humanities and the Arts, Member (since 2014)
- German Academy of Science and Engineering (Acatech), Member (since 2013)
- Fazit-Stiftung, Member of the Board of Trustees (–2022)

== Controversy ==
In 2022, news media reported critically about payments made by Uber to prominent academics and highlighted Haucap's role. Haucap had agreed to produce a study on “consumer benefits from a liberalisation of the German taxi market”, in collaboration with a consultancy arm of the German Institute for Economic Research (DIW), for what a news leak suggested was a fee of €48,000 plus VAT. Haucap launched the report at events for influencers and politicians in Berlin.

== Selected publications ==
- Schmidt, I., Haucap, J. (2013). Wettbewerbspolitik und Kartellrecht: Eine interdisziplinäre Einführung. Berlin: Walter de Gruyter.
