= Toni Stolper =

Austrian-German economist and journalist

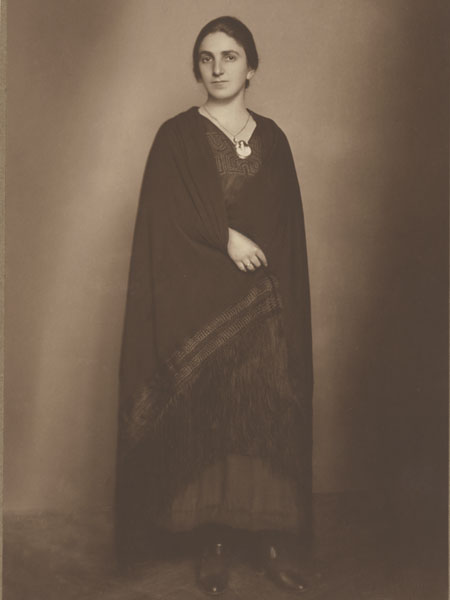
- Stolper in 1924
- Born: 22 November 1890; Vienna, Austria-Hungary
- Died: 18 October 1988 (aged 97); Alexandria, Virginia, United States
- Spouse: Gustav Stolper

Academic background
- Education: University of Berlin
- Doctoral advisor: Heinrich Herkner

Antonie "Toni" Stolper (22 November 1890 – 18 October 1988) was an Austrian-German economist and journalist. She fled Europe and immigrated to the United States in 1933 and moved to Canada in 1977.

== Biography ==
Stolper was born Antonie Kassowitz, daughter of Max Kassowitz and Julie Kassowitz, in Vienna, Austria in 1890. She studied law in Vienna and economics in Berlin, Germany, earning her doctorate under Heinrich Herkner in 1917. In 1921, she married Gustav Stolper, the editor of a journal called Der Österreichische Volkswirt (The Austrian Economist). In 1925, the couple moved to Berlin, where Gustav Stolper established a new paper, Der Deutsche Volkswirt (The German Economist). Toni Stolper wrote regularly for both of these publications, particularly on questions related to English and Russian economics. She became a German citizen in 1926.

Toni Stolper became a friend of Theodor Heuss during this time in Berlin. After both Theodor Heuss and Toni Stolper lost their first spouses, the two had a loving relationship but never married.

Toni Stolper was an active journalist and engaged in social politics. The Stolpers fled Berlin in 1933 but kept up correspondence with friends, among whom were important politicians and intellectuals including Willy Brandt, Julius Braunthal, and Lilo Linke. She co-founded the immigrant assistance organizations Selfhelp and the American Council for Emigrés in the Professions. She published a biography of her husband in 1960 titled Ein Leben in Brennpunkten unserer Zeit. She also translated a study written by her daughter Joan Campbell on the Deutscher Werkbund in 1981, titled The German Werkbund: The Politics of Reform in the Applied Arts.
