= RWI – Leibniz Institute for Economic Research =

Economic research institute

RWI
- RWI – Leibniz-Institut für Wirtschaftsforschung
- Type: Non-profit
- Established: 1926
- Founder: Ernst Wagemann
- Affiliations: Leibniz Association
- President: Christoph M. Schmidt
- Faculty: approx. 90
- Total staff: approx. 130
- Location: Essen, North Rhine-Westphalia, Germany
- Website: www.rwi-essen.de/en/

The RWI – Leibniz Institute for Economic Research (RWI, formerly German: Rheinisch-Westfälisches Institut für Wirtschaftsforschung) is an independent economic research institute and think tank in Essen, Germany. Founded in 1926, the RWI maintains a non-profit status, mainly funded through public means while also receiving third party funding. It conducts research on economic development, assists policy-making, and fosters economic literacy for the public. The RWI currently employs 130 people and is part of the Leibniz Association, a group of non-university research institutes in Germany.

The current president of the RWI is Christoph M. Schmidt, a German economist and professor for economic policy and applied econometrics at Ruhr-Universität Bochum.

== History ==
The RWI began operations in 1926. Founded by Walther Däbritz, the RWI was initially intended to be the western division of the Institut für Konjunkturforschung (today, the German Institute for Economic Research). The Essen branch sought to observe economic patterns and trends in the Rhine-Westphalian industrial region.

After the Second World War, the coal and steel industries became integral to German integration back into the European and world economy. The RWI continued to conduct research, joining the Arbeitsgemeinschaft Deutscher Wirtschaftswissenschaftlicher Forschungsinstitute (Working Committee of German Economic Research Institutes) in 1949 and the Westdeutscher Handwerkskammertag (West German Chamber of Crafts and Skilled Trades' Council) in 1950.

By the 1970s, the RWI established itself as a leading economic research institute. In 2002, Schmidt became president and expanded the research areas to include fields such as labor market policy, education policy, and migration. On August 17, 2017, the RWI changed its name to the RWI – Leibniz-Institut für Wirtschaftsforschung. Past presidents of the RWI include:

- 1926-1947: Ernst Wagemann
- 1947-1952: Bruno Kuske
- 1952-1972: Theodor Wessels
- from 1972/73: Board of Directors: Bernhard Filusch, Willi Lamberts, Gregor Winkelmeyer
- 1986: Hans K. Schneider
- 1989: Paul Klemmer
- 2002-present: Christoph M. Schmidt

== Research ==
The research work of the RWI is structured along four "competence areas":

- Labor Markets, Education, Population
- Health Economics
- Environment and Resources
- Climate Change and Development
- Macroeconomics and Public Finance

== Education ==
The RWI is one of the administrators of the Ruhr Graduate School in Economics (RGS Econ). Founded in 2004, the RGS Econ collaborates with universities in Bochum, Dortmund, and Duisburg-Essen to provide scholars the opportunity to conduct economic research. RGS Econ also offers a PhD program.

== Report on the German economy ==
The RWI is one of the economic research institutes in Germany that, twice a year (in spring and autumn), submit a joint report on the state of the German economy, the so-called Gemeinschaftsdiagnose (joint diagnosis). The other institutes that submit the research report as part of the Leibniz Association include:

- The Kiel Institute for the World Economy in Kiel
- German Institute for Economic Research (DIW) in Berlin
- Ifo Institute for Economic Research in Munich, in cooperation with the KOF Konjunkturforschungsstelle of the ETH Zürich, in Zürich, Switzerland
- Halle Institute for Economic Research (IWH) in Halle, in cooperation with the Institut für Makroökonomie und Konjunkturforschung in the Hans Böckler Foundation in Düsseldorf, and Austrian Institute of Economic Research in Vienna, Austria
- Hamburgisches Welt-Wirtschafts-Archiv in Hamburg
