= Verein für Socialpolitik =

German society of economists

The Verein für Socialpolitik (German: [fɐˈʔaɪn fyːɐ̯ zoˈtsi̯al.poliˌtiːk]; literally: Association for Social Policy), or the German Economic Association, is a society of economists in the German-speaking area.

== History ==
The Verein was founded in Eisenach in 1872 as a response to the "social question". Among its founders were eminent economists like Gustav von Schmoller, Lujo Brentano and Adolph Wagner, who sought a middle path between socialist and laissez-faire economic policies. On the contrary, the liberal publicist Heinrich Bernhard Oppenheim, critical of their "fanciful positions", dubbed them the Kathedersozialisten (socialists of the chair), meant as pejorative term. Gradually the Verein became less focused on social policy per se, and dealt with wider areas of economic policy and theory, especially after the First World War.

Among its later members were prominent sociologists like Max Weber and Werner Sombart. They took part in the famous Werturteilsstreit with the older generation of the Verein just before the First World War. The Verein was dissolved in 1936 under the Nazis, but was re-created in 1948 at a conference in Marburg.

Today, the Verein is headquartered in Berlin. It currently has around 3,800 individual members and 48 corporate members. It publishes a monograph series, the Schriften des Vereins für Sozialpolitik, as well as two journals: the German Economic Review and Perspektiven der Wirtschaftspolitik. The verein annually awards the Gossen Prize to German-speaking economists under the age of 45. Another award given by the association is the Gustav Stolper Prize; it is named after economist Gustav Stolper, and is not subject to any age restrictions.

== Important members ==
- Lujo Brentano (1844–1931), German economist and social reformer, co-founder of the Verein
- Karl Bücher (1847–1930), German economist
- Gustav Cohn (1840–1919), German economist
- Constantin von Dietze (1891–1973), agronomist, lawyer, economist, and theologian
- Ernst Engel (1821–1896), German statistician and economist
- Walter Eucken (1891–1950), German economist
- Carl Geibel (1842–1910), founding member, German book dealer and publisher
- Martin Hellwig (born 1949), German economist
- Ignaz Jastrow (1856–1937), German economist and historian
- Georg Friedrich Knapp (1842–1926), German economist
- Roland Kirstein (born 1965), German economist and professor
- Emil Lederer (1882–1939), Bohemian-German economist and sociologist
- Wilhelm Lexis (1837–1914), German statistician, economist, and social scientist
- Friedrich Naumann (1860–1919), German liberal politician and Protestant parish pastor
- Karl Rathgen (1856–1921), German Economist
- Alexander Rüstow (1885–1963), German sociologist and economist
- Gerhart von Schulze-Gävernitz (1864–1943), German economist and politician
- Gustav von Schmoller (1838–1917), German economist
- Gustav von Schönberg (1839–1908), German economist
- Max Sering (1857–1939), German economist
- Hans-Werner Sinn (born 1948), German economist
- Werner Sombart (1863–1941), German sociologist and economist
- Arthur Spiethoff (1873–1957), German economist
- Ferdinand Tönnies (1855–1936), German sociologist and philosopher
- Adolph Wagner (1835–1917), German economist
- Adolf Weber (1876–1963), German economist
- Alfred Weber (1868–1958), German economist and sociologist
- Max Weber (1864–1920), German sociologist and economist

== See also ==
- German Sociological Association
- American Economic Association

== Sources ==
- Franz Boese: Geschichte des Vereins für Sozialpolitik, 1872–1932. Duncker & Humblot, Berlin 1939.
- Dieter Lindenlaub: Richtungskämpfe im Verein für Sozialpolitik: Wissenschaft und Socialpolitik im Kaiserreich vornehmlich vom Beginn des 'Neuen Kurses' bis zum Ausbruch des 1. Weltkrieges (1890–1914). Franz Steiner Verlag, Stuttgart 1967.
- Steven Leon McClellan, German Economists and the Intersection of Science and Politics: A History of the Verein für Sozialpolitik, 1872–1972. Ph.D. Dissertation, Department of History, University Toronto 2022.
