= Fabian Waldinger =

Economist

Fabian Waldinger (born February 11, 1978) is a German economist and Professor of Economics at LMU Munich (as of September 2026). His research is focused on the interplay between innovation, economic history and labour economics. He is a 2020 recipient of the Gossen Prize for his contributions to the understanding of knowledge based on historical events and what the role of teachers and colleagues is therein, including the long-term negative effects of the displacement of researchers in Nazi Germany, and a 2017 recipient of the Philip Leverhulme Prize in Economics for his research on peer effects in science.

== Biography ==
After studying business administration and economics at the University of Passau from 1998 to 2000, Fabian Waldinger pursued his graduate studies at the London School of Economics. There, he obtained a M.Sc. and a Ph.D. in economics in 2004 and 2008, respectively, with Jörn-Steffen Pischke being his PhD supervisor. Following his studies, Waldinger became an assistant professor of economics at the University of Warwick in 2009, where he was promoted to associate professor in 2011. From 2016 to 2018, he worked as an associate professor at the London School of Economics, whereafter he became a full professor within LMU Munich's Department of Economics. In addition, he has held visiting positions at the University of California at Berkeley, Harvard University and the MIT Sloan School of Management. Waldinger is affiliated with the CAGE Research Centre at the University of Warwick, the ifo Institute for Economic Research (CESifo), the Centre for Economic Policy Research (CEPR), IZA Institute of Labor Economics, and the Centre for Research and Analysis of Migration (CReAM).

== Research ==
Fabian Waldinger's research focuses on the economics of science and innovation, economic history, labour economics, and applied microeconomics. Based on the citations of his research on IDEAS/RePEc, he counts among the top 5% of most cited economists.

=== Research on the impacts of forced displacement during Nazi Germany ===
A recurrent theme within Fabian Waldinger's research is the use of the politically motivated dismissal or displacement of groups during Nazi Germany as a source of exogenous variation to address problems of endogeneity that would otherwise limit inferring that the effects on scientific production associated by these dismissals or displacements are indeed caused by them. For instance, exploiting the forced emigration of mathematics professors in Nazi Germany, Waldinger finds that a one-standard-deviation decrease in faculty quality decreases the probability of publishing a PhD student's dissertation in a top journal by 13pp, the probability of becoming a full professor by 10pp, the probability of having positive lifetime citations by 16pp, and the number of lifetime citations by 6.3 pp. More generally, using the dismissal of scientists in physics, chemistry and mathematics by the Nazi government in 1933 as a source of exogenous variation in the peer group of scientists staying in Germany to address endogeneity problems in peer effect estimation, Waldinger finds no evidence of local peer effects among university scientists both on average and for very high-quality scientists. Specifically for chemistry, Fabian Waldinger, Petra Moser and Alessandra Voena find that patenting by U.S. inventors increased by 31% in 1933–1945 in the research fields of Jewish émigrés from Nazi Germany, with émigrés' positive impact on innovation being driven rather by their ability to attract new researchers to their fields than increases to the productivity of incumbent inventors. Finally, exploiting the dismissal of scientists in Nazi Germany and World War II bombings to examine the role of human and physical capital for scientific knowledge creation, Waldinger finds that a 10% shock to human capital - especially the dismissal of star scientists - reduced output by 0.2 SD in the short run, and the reduction persisted in the long run, whereas a 10% shock to physical capital reduced output only intermittently by 0.05 SD. While most of Waldinger's research focuses on scientific knowledge systems, he has also performed important research on the impact of displacement on firm performance. For example, investigating how expulsions of senior Jewish managers due to rising discrimination in Nazi Germany affected large corporations, Fabian Waldinger, Kilian Huber and Volker Lindenthal find that firms that lost Jewish managers experienced persistent reductions in stock prices, dividends, and returns on assets and that aggregate market value fell by roughly 1.8% of German GNP because of the expulsions, with managers who served as key connectors to other firms and managers who were highly educated being particularly important for firm performance, thereby showcasing how discrimination against qualified business leaders causes first-order economic losses.

=== Other research ===
- Measuring selection among high-skilled emigrants from Germany using predicted earnings, Fabian Waldinger, Matthias Parey, Jens Ruhose and Nicolai Netz find that migrants to less equal countries are positively selected relative to non-migrants, reflecting university quality and grades, whereas migrants to more equal countries are negatively selected, reflecting university subject and gender, in line with the predictions of George Borjas' model of immigrant self-selection, with German migrants to the U:S. being highly positively selected and concentrated in STEM fields.
- Comparing changes in the scientific productivity for scientists from Entente countries who relied on frontier research from abroad to changes for Entente scientists who relied on frontier research from home, Fabian Waldinger, Alessandro Iaria and Carlo Schwarz find that, after the start of World War I in 1914, the former group published fewer papers in top scientific journals, produced less Nobel Prize-nominated research, introduced fewer, novel scientific words, and introduced fewer novel words that appeared in the text of subsequent patent grants, with the productivity of scientists who relied on top 1% research declining twice as much as that of scientists who relied on top 3% research and highly prolific scientists experiencing the strongest absolute productivity declines. Overall, the research showcases how World War I and the subsequent boycott against scientists from the Central Powers severely interrupted scientific cooperation and highlights that scientific and technological progress require access to the very best research, no matter its origin.
- Using the introduction and expansion of the European ERASMUS Programme as an instrument for studying abroad, Fabian Waldinger and Matthias Parey find that studying abroad increases an individual's likelihood of working in a foreign country by about 15pp.
