= Christoph Trebesch =

Christoph Trebesch is a German economist and Professor of Global Macroeconomics and Global Governance at Kiel University (as of October 2026). His research areas encompass international finance, economic and financial crises and fiscal policy. He is the 2024 recipient of the Gossen Prize for his contributions to a "better understanding for the growth of populist forces and the rise of China" and has been listed as "Top 40 under 40" in science and society by the German magazine Capital.

== Biography ==
Christoph Trebesch studied at the Free University of Berlin, obtaining a master's degree in economics in 2005, whereafter he completed the Kiel Institute for the World Economy's Advanced Studies Programme. He then graduated in 2011 from the Free University of Berlin with a Ph.D. in economics with a doctoral thesis on sovereign default and crisis resolution (advised by Helge Berger and Henrik Enderlein), which was awarded with the Ernst Reuter Dissertation Prize of the university. After finishing his studies, he took up an appointment as assistant professor at LMU Munich's Department of Economics, from where he moved in 2017 to Kiel University to become a full professor of economics and take up the role of director of the research area "International Finance and Macroeconomics" at the Kiel Institute for the World Economy. Trebesch maintains affiliations with various organizations, including the Centre for Economic Policy Research (CEPR), where he co-leads the research networks on geoeconomics and on international lending and sovereign debt, and CESifo. He has also been since 2019 a member of the German Ministry of Finance's academic advisory board.

== Research ==
Christoph Trebesch's research topics focus on the economics of public debt and debt crises, political economy, international capital flows, international financial institutions, geoeconomics, financial stability and financial crises. Based on the citations of his work, he is ranked among the top 2% of economists registered on IDEAS/RePEc (as of October 2026).

=== Research on sovereign debt ===
Together with Matthias Schlegl and Mark L.J. Wright, Trebesch and his co-authors find that servicing of private sovereign debt such as bank loans and bonds as well as to multilateral institutions such as the World Bank and International Monetary Fund are prioritized relative to servicing of government-to-government debts, with private creditors generally losing less than bilateral official (government-to-government) creditors. In joint work with Julian Schumacher and Henrik Enderlein, Christoph Trebesch show that creditor lawsuits against defaulting governments in the U.S. and the U.K. - an increasingly common occurrence in sovereign debt markets - have disrupted governments' access to international capital markets, as courts in these countries have become able to financially embargo sovereign countries, suggesting that sovereign debt has become more enforceable. Studying the monthly prices of foreign currency government bonds traded in London and New York from the Battle of Waterloo in 1815 to 2016 for 91 countries, Trebesch, Josefin Meyer and Reinhart observe that the returns on external sovereign bonds have been sufficiently high to compensate for risk, with real ex post returns averaging more than 6% per year across two centuries, equivalent to an excess return of 3-4 % over US or UK government bonds and mainly driven by high average coupons offered on external sovereign bonds. They also highlight that over 300 sovereign debt restructurings since 1815 full debt repudiation is rare and the median creditor loss amounts to less than half the value of the principal. Together with Vincent and Carmen Reinhart, Trebesch has also highlighted the strong overlap between the fluctuations in economies' financial capital, the commodity price super-cycle and sovereign defaults since 1815, with important implications for the vulnerability of emerging markets simultaneously facing capital outflows and decreasing commodity prices.

==== Research on sovereign debt restructuring ====
Studying preemptive restructurings of sovereign debt - i.e., debt restructurings that happen before a payment default - with Tamon Asonuma, Christoph Trebesch found that such restructurings are (i) frequent (38% of all restructuring deals between 1978 and 2010), (ii) have lower haircuts, (iii) are quicker to negotiate and (iv) see lower losses in economic output; Trebesch and Asonuma argue that preemptive restructurings tend to occur when default risk is already high prior to debt renegotiations, whereas sovereign defaults happen mainly after unexpected negative shocks to the economy. Trebesch also found that delays in renegotiations of debt between governments and foreign banks and bondholders tend to be delayed by domestic political instability (controlling for macroeconomic conditions), with government crises, resignations and street protests being particularly disruptive for a rapid settlement of the debt renegotiations. Examining sovereign debt relief of intergovernmental debt in 1920–1939 and emerging market debt crises with private external creditors in 1978–2010, Christoph Trebesch and Carmen Reinhart find that the economic landscape of debtor countries improves significantly only if debt relief involves debt write-offs, whereas softer forms of debt relief, e.g., maturity extensions and interest rate reductions, tend not to be followed by higher economic growth or better credit ratings. Regarding the 2012 restructuring of Greek debt, Trebesch, Jeromin Zettelmeyer and Mitu Gulati note that it achieved very large debt relief equal to more than half of Greece's 2012 GDP with minimal financial disruption due to a mix of new legal techniques, very large cash incentives and government pressure on key creditors, though likely at the cost of impeding future debt restructurings in Europe, as a different timing and design of the restructuring could have considerably lowered the burden on Greece, the restructuring created a large risk for European taxpayers and as it has set unfavorable precedents (e.g., the generous treatment of holdout creditors). Based on data of all 180 creditor losses ("haircuts") in debt restructurings with foreign banks and bondholders in 1970–2010, Christoph Trebesch and Juan J. Cruces show that debt restructurings involving higher haircuts are associated with significantly higher bond yield spreads and longer periods of exclusion from capital markets.

=== Research on Chinese international lending ===
Together with Sebastian Horn and Carmen Reinhart, Christoph Trebesch used loan-level lending data for 4900 loans and grants issued by China to 146 countries between 1949 and 2017 to estimate the amounts of debt owed by over 100 developing and emerging economies to China since 2000; they find that, by 2017, China had surpassed the World Bank and International Monetary Fund to become the world's largest official creditor, that China tends to issue international loans whose terms resemble commercial rather than governmental lending and that half of China's international governmental lending to developing countries is not reported in the most widely used official debt statistics, with severe consequences for debt sustainability. More specifically, analyzing 100 debt contracts between Chinese state-owned entities and government borrowers in 24 developing countries in Africa, Asia, Eastern Europe, Latin America and Oceania and comparing them with those of other bilateral, multilateral and commercial creditors, Trebesch, Horn as well as Anna Gelpern, Scott Morris and Brad Parks find (i) that Chinese contracts contain unusual confidentiality clauses that keep borrowers from disclosing the terms or even the existence of the debt, (ii) that Chinese lenders seek advantage over other creditors, using collateral arrangements such as lender-controlled revenue accounts and promises to keep the debt out of collective restructuring, and (iii) that cancellation, acceleration and stabilization clauses in Chinese contracts potentially allow the lenders to influence debtors' domestic and foreign policies. In particular, Trebesch and his co-authors argue that the combination of confidentiality, seniority and policy influence limits sovereign debtors' options to manage fiscal crises and make renegotiating debts more complicated - serious doubts as to the judicial enforceability of the terms of Chinese debt contracts notwithstanding. This picture is complemented by Trebesch's research with Horn, Parks and Reinhart on China's new role as international lender of last resort between 2000 and 2021, with China extending more than USD 170 billion in liquidity support to countries experiencing financial distress through a global swap line network put in place by the People's Bank of China as well as more than USD 70 billion in rescue loans for balance of payments support through Chinese state-owned banks and enterprises, i.e., with Chinese overseas bailouts corresponding to 20% of total IMF lending during the 2010s. However, Trebesch and his co-authors criticize these rescue loans for carrying relatively high interest rates, being opaque and being almost exclusively targeted to debtors of China's Belt and Road Initiative.

=== Research on the economics of political extremism ===
In work with Moritz Schularick and Manuel Funke, Trebesch finds that policy uncertainty rises strongly after financial crises as government majorities decrease and political polarization increases, with post-crisis voters being particularly attracted to the xenophobic rhetoric of the extreme right, which see their vote share increase by an average of 30% after a financial crisis, whereas such political dynamics are absent after normal recessions or non-financial macroeconomic shocks. They also find that the economic cost of populism is high, with GDP per capita being 10% lower after 15 years of populist rule compared a counterfactual economic trajectory under a non-populist government, as populist rule is often accompanied by economic disintegration, lower macroeconomic stability and institutional erosion. Specifically in emerging economies, Trebesch, Helios Herrera and Guillermo Ordonez find that hikes in governments' popularity - "political booms" predict financial crises better than other early warning indicators like credit booms because governments in these countries are more strongly incentivized to sustain unsound credit booms to maintain their popularity rather than implement corrective policies that can prevent crises but are politically costly.

=== Other research ===
- Trebesch, Toman Barsbai, Hillel Rapoport and Andreas Steinmayr found that the emigration wave that started after the Russian crisis of 1998 strongly affected political preferences and outcomes in Moldova in the 2000s, eventually contributing to the fall of Europe's last communist government, as Moldovan labour migrants to both more democratic Western Europe and to less democratic Russia brought back information and cultural preferences in favour of democracy.
- Trebesch and Toman Omar Mahmoud found that individual human trafficking risks in Belarus, Bulgaria, Moldova, Romania and Ukraine are much higher in regions with large emigration flows, as traffickers have to pay less to recruit in emigration areas and, to a lesser extent, there is worse self-selection into migration, with illegal migration increasing trafficking risks and better information likely effective to reduce this form of crime.
- Trebesch and Cathrin Mohr reviewed the literature on geoeconomics and its subfields, including (i) the use of geoeconomic policy tools such as sanctions and embargoes, (ii) the geopolitics of international trade, (iii) the geopolitics of international finance, (iv) the literature on geopolitical risks and its spillovers to the domestic economy, and (v) the economics of war.
