= Gossen Prize =

Annual award in economic sciences

The Gossen Prize is an annual award given by the Verein für Socialpolitik to German-speaking economists under the age of 45 whose work gained international recognition. The jury—the extended committee of the Verein für Socialpolitik—especially considers the scientist's number of publications in prestigious English-speaking journals and their mentions on the Social Sciences Citation Index. The award is named after Hermann Heinrich Gossen.

== Recipients ==
Year	Recipients	University
1997	Jürgen von Hagen	University of Bonn
1998	Michael C. Burda	Humboldt University of Berlin
1999	Ernst Fehr	University of Zurich
2000	Kai A. Konrad	Free University of Berlin
2001	Klaus M. Schmidt	LMU Munich
2002	Lars-Hendrik Röller	Humboldt University of Berlin
2003	Harald Uhlig	Humboldt University of Berlin
2004	Benny Moldovanu	University of Bonn
2005	Simon Gächter	University of Nottingham
2006	Axel Ockenfels	University of Cologne
2007	Georg Nöldeke	University of Basel
2008	Armin Falk	University of Bonn
2009	Holger Görg	Kiel University
2010	Roman Inderst	Goethe University Frankfurt
2011	Peter Egger	University of Zurich
2012	Felix Kübler	University of Zurich
2013	Michèle Tertilt	University of Mannheim
2014	Ludger Wößmann	LMU Munich
2015	Uwe Sunde	LMU Munich
2016	Nicola Fuchs-Schündeln	Goethe University Frankfurt
2017	Georg Weizsäcker	Humboldt University of Berlin
2018	Moritz Schularick	University of Bonn
2019	Davide Cantoni	LMU Munich
2020	Fabian Waldinger	LMU Munich
2021	Florian Scheuer	University of Zurich
2022	Christian Bayer	University of Bonn
2023	David Dorn	University of Zurich
2024	Christoph Trebesch	Kiel University
2025	Claudia Steinwender	LMU Munich
2026	Christopher Roth	University of Cologne

== See also ==
- List of economics awards
- John Bates Clark Medal
- Yrjö Jahnsson Award
- Nakahara Prize
- Assar Lindbeck Medal
- Prix du meilleur jeune économiste de France
