= Uwe Sunde =

German economist

Uwe Sunde (born in Garmisch-Partenkirchen on May 29, 1973) is a German economist and currently Professor of Economics at LMU Munich as well as a Research Professor in the ifo Center for Labour and Demographic Economics. Sunde's research interests include long-term development and growth, political economy, labour economics, population economics, and behavioural economics. In 2015, his research on risk preferences and on the role of life expectancy and human capital for long-term economic development earned him the Gossen Prize. In 2019, he was elected member of the Academia Europaea. In 2023, he was awarded an honorary doctorate of the University of Lucerne, Switzerland.

== Biography ==
A native of Garmisch-Partenkirchen, Uwe Sunde spent his undergraduate and postgraduate studies at LMU Munich and University of Warwick (as Erasmus exchange), and earned a diploma in economics in 1998. Thereafter, he participated in the European Doctoral Program at the Pompeu Fabra University and University of Bonn, receiving his Ph.D. from the latter in 2003.

After earning his Ph.D., Sunde worked as a research associate and later as a postdoctoral researcher at the Institute for the Study of Labor (IZA) and the Bonn Graduate School of Economics (2003–2008), at the end of which he earned his habilitation from the University of Bonn. He then moved to the University of St. Gallen, where he held the positions of Professor of Macroeconomics and Director of the Swiss Institute for Empirical Economic Research (SEW-HSG). Having returned to Germany in 2012, Uwe Sunde has been a professor of economics at LMU ever since then. In parallel, Sunde is affiliated with the ifo Center for Labour and Demographic Economics and the DIW Berlin as a research professor and with the Centre for Economic Policy Research (CEPR) and IZA as a research fellow.

In terms of professional activities, he is member of the Councils for Population Economics, for Macroeconomics and for Organization Economics within the German Economic Association, on whose Extended Board he sat in 2015/16, chairs the Survey Committee of the German Socio-Economic Panel (SOEP), and participates in the selection of the recipients of the Humboldt Research Awards within the Alexander von Humboldt Foundation. Moreover, he performs editorial duties for the academic journals Journal of Population Economics and Journal of the Economics of Aging and has edited the Journal of Economic Behavior and Organization as well as Applied Economics Quarterly in the past. Finally, he has also been in the past a member of the Executive Board of the European Association of Labour Economists (EALE), an extramural fellow at the University of Maastricht, and a coordinator of IZA's Guest and Visitors Programme.

== Research ==
Uwe Sunde's research interests include long-term development and human capital formation, labour economics, population economics, and behavioural economics. According to IDEAS/RePEc, Sunde ranks among the top 2% of highest cited economists worldwide.

=== Research on risk attitudes and patience ===
One major area of Sunde's research concerns individuals' risk attitudes, which he has extensively explored with Armin Falk, Thomas Dohmen and David Huffman. Together with Holger Bonin, they find that risk averse individuals sort themselves into occupations with low earnings risk, independently of where they live (in Germany), what gender they are or what their previous labour market experience was. They also find that lower cognitive ability is associated with greater risk aversion and more pronounced impatience. Another accomplishment of their research in cooperation with David A. Jaeger and Holger Bonin has been to provide direct evidence for the hypothesis that individuals who are less risk averse are more likely to migrate.

In their two most seminal contributions, they explore the measurement, determinants and behavioural consequences of individual risk attitudes (with Jürgen Schupp and Gert Wagner) as well as the transmission of risk and trust attitudes across generations. In the former, they find that asking individuals to rate their "general" willingness to take risk on a scale from 1 to 10 yields the best all-round predictor of risky behaviour, which significantly depends on individuals' gender, age, height and parental background. In the latter, they find that the transmission across others of risk and trust attitudes depends on (i) the transmission of attitudes from parents to children, (ii) the attitudes prevailing in the local environment, and individuals' tendency to mate with partners with similar attitudes. Additionally, the transmission process is strongly affected by socialization, which itself is reinforced by parental characteristics and aspects of family structure. In subsequent work together with Anke Becker and Benjamin Enke, they elicited risk attitudes, time preferences and different measures of prosociality among representative samples in 76 countries.

=== Research on neuroeconomics and reciprocity ===
In parallel, Sunde, Falk and Dohmen have also researched other aspects of behavioural economics, including neuroeconomics and reciprocity. In neuroeconomics, together with Klaus Fliessbach, Christian E. Elger and Bernd Weber, they find that social comparison affects reward-related brain activity in the human ventral striatum. Furthermore, this activation in the ventral striatum increases in absolute income and - for a given level of absolute income - decreases in lower relative income in both men and women. Similarly, they find that the mere outperforming of the other subject positively affects this reward-related brain area. In their research on reciprocity, Sunde, Dohmen, Falk and Huffman find that most people say that they will respond in kind to positive or negative actions, though with wide differences in the degree of trust and reciprocity. Whereas trust and negative reciprocity are negatively correlated, trust and positive reciprocity are only weakly correlated, with women and the elderly having on average stronger positive and weaker negative reciprocal tendencies. Finally, in another study, they find evidence that reciprocity affects labour market outcomes, with positive reciprocity being associated with higher wages and higher work effort, whereas negative reciprocity is correlated with reduced effort and an increased likelihood of being unemployed.

=== Research on population economics ===
Together with Matteo Cervellati, Uwe Sunde has developed a theory of economic development based on the idea of a positive feedback loop between longevity and human capital that is triggered by endogenous skill-biased technological change. Therein, skill-biased technological change helps to increase the time over which individuals reap returns on their human capital by expanding longevity and thus allows to compensate for the initially prohibitively high cost of human capital formation. As a result, an economy transitions from underdevelopment to sustained growth. Building upon this theory, Sunde and Cervellati further explore how life expectancy affects economic growth in the situation of a demographic transition and how delays in demographic development explain comparative development across the world. In related work, they investigate the role of the rise in life expectancy for the secular expansion of education and the secular decline in lifetime labor supply.

=== Research on political economy ===
In related work, Uwe Sunde has investigated the mechanisms of institutional dynamics and democratization, as well as the determinants of democratic attitudes.
