= Alessandra Voena =

Italian development and labor economist

- Education: Stanford University (MA, PhD); University of Turin (BA)
- Spouse: Neale Mahoney
- Awards: Sloan Research Fellowship; Carlo Alberto Medal; Fellow of the Econometric Society
- Scientific career
- Fields: Economics
- Workplaces: Stanford University
- Thesis: Essays in Applied Microeconomics (2011)
- Academic advisors: Petra Moser; Caroline Hoxby; Luigi Pistaferri; Michèle Tertilt; Monika Piazzesi
- Website: avoena.people.stanford.edu

Alessandra Voena is an Italian and American development and labor economist currently serving as the Holbrook Working Professor of Price Theory at Stanford University. Her research focuses on the economics of the family, in addition to the study of science and innovation. Voena is an elected fellow of the Econometric Society, and is the recipient of a Sloan Research Fellowship. In 2017, she received the Carlo Alberto Medal, awarded biennially by the Collegio Carlo Alberto to the best Italian economist under the age of 40.

== Biography ==
Voena received her BA from the University of Turin in 2005, and her MA and PhD in Economics from Stanford University in 2011. Her dissertation committee was chaired by Luigi Pistaferri and Michèle Tertilt, and included Caroline Hoxby, Petra Moser, and Monika Piazzesi.

After completing her PhD, Voena joined the Harvard Kennedy School as a post-doctoral fellow, followed by the University of Chicago as an assistant professor. In 2020, she moved to Stanford University, where she currently serves as Holbrook Working Professor of Price Theory and as Professor of Economics. She is also a Senior Fellow at the Stanford Institute for Economic Policy Research.

In addition to her academic appointments, Voena was an Editor of the Journal of Labor Economics and is a Foreign Editor at the Review of Economic Studies. She is affiliated with the National Bureau of Economic Research and Centre for Economic Policy Research.

In 2017, Voena received a Sloan Research Fellowship, awarded by the Alfred P. Sloan Foundation to early-career scientists in recognition of distinguished performance. The same year, she won the Carlo Alberto Medal, awarded biennially by the Collegio Carlo Alberto to the best Italian economist under 40. In 2022, Voena was elected a Fellow of the Econometric Society.

Voena is married to Neale Mahoney, also a professor of economics at Stanford University.

== Research ==
Voena's research focuses on the economics of the household, in addition to the economics of science and innovation. According to Research Papers in Economics, she is among the top 500 female economists in the world.

=== Science and innovation ===
Voena's early work examined the impact of migration and intellectual property on scientific discovery. In work with Petra Moser and Fabian Waldinger in the American Economic Review, Voena shows that German-Jewish immigration to the United States as a result of World War II increased patenting in subfields of chemistry specialized in by the arriving scientists.

In related work, Voena and Moser study the Trading with the Enemy Act, which allowed American firms to violate foreign intellectual property during World War I if deemed valuable to the US military effort. The paper showed that compulsory licensing of foreign patents increased downstream domestic patenting in affected chemical subclasses by nearly 20%.

=== Economics of the family ===
In recent years, Voena has focused on development economics and the economics of the family. In work with Nava Ashraf, Nathan Nunn, and Natalie Bau, Voena shows that there exists a positive relationship between female education and bride price, such that the effects of school construction programs such as Indonesia's INPRES are strongest in ethnic groups that maintain the practice.

In another paper with Lucia Corno and Nicole Hildebrandt, Voena leverages plausibly exogenous variation in incomes resulting from drought to show that economic conditions affect the timing of marriage and child-bearing. In India (where dowry is common), drought reduces the rate of child marriage, while in Sub-Saharan Africa (where bride price prevails), drought increases its incidence. This is consistent with a model in which households use marriage payments (either from or to the bride's family) to smooth consumption over time.

== Selected publications ==
- Moser, Petra; Voena, Alessandra (1 February 2012). "Compulsory Licensing: Evidence from the Trading with the Enemy Act" (PDF). American Economic Review. 102 (1): 396–427. doi:10.1257/aer.102.1.396. ISSN 0002-8282.
- Moser, Petra; Voena, Alessandra; Waldinger, Fabian (1 October 2014). "German Jewish Émigrés and US Invention". American Economic Review. 104 (10): 3222–3255. doi:10.1257/aer.104.10.3222. ISSN 0002-8282.
- Voena, Alessandra (1 August 2015). "Yours, Mine, and Ours: Do Divorce Laws Affect the Intertemporal Behavior of Married Couples?". American Economic Review. 105 (8): 2295–2332. doi:10.1257/aer.20120234. ISSN 0002-8282.
- Corno, Lucia; Hildebrandt, Nicole; Voena, Alessandra (2020). "Age of Marriage, Weather Shocks, and the Direction of Marriage Payments". Econometrica. 88 (3): 879–915. doi:10.3982/ECTA15505. ISSN 0012-9682.
- Ashraf, Nava; Bau, Natalie; Nunn, Nathan; Voena, Alessandra (1 February 2020). "Bride Price and Female Education". Journal of Political Economy. 128 (2): 591–641. doi:10.1086/704572. ISSN 0022-3808.
