= Georg Nöldeke =

Georg Nöldeke (born November 19, 1964) is an economist and currently serves as Professor of Economics at the University of Basel. His research interests focuses on microeconomic theory, game theory, and social evolution. In 2007, Georg Nöldeke's contributions to economics of information - in particular on the communication within financial markets - as well as to game theory and contract theory were awarded the Gossen Prize by the German Economic Association.

== Biography ==
After having spent his undergraduate studies at the University of Bonn and at the University of California, Berkeley, Georg Nöldeke earned a diploma in economics from the University of Bonn in 1988. In 1992, after graduate studies at the University of Bonn and at the London School of Economics, he further earned a Ph.D. from the former while simultaneously working there as a teaching and research assistant (1989–92). Following his studies, he became an assistant professor of economics at Princeton University (1992–94) before returning to Bonn in 1994, where he took up the position of an associate professor. Three years later, Nöldeke moved to the University of Basel, where he was made professor of economics (1997–99) and directed the university's graduate studies in economics, before taking up the same position at the University of Bonn two years later (1999-2006). During his tenure at Bonn, he also served as co-director of graduate studies, chairman of the Department of Economics, and Dean of the Faculty of Law and Economics. Finally, having returned to Switzerland, he has been a professor of economics at the University of Basel since 2006. However, Nöldeke has also held in parallel many visiting appointments, e.g., at Yale University, Yale-NUS College, University of Toulouse, University of Zurich, LMU Munich, and Tel Aviv University.

At the University of Basel, Georg Nöldeke is the founder of the Bernoulli Network for the Behavioral Sciences. He also is affiliated with the German Economic Association, wherein he currently serves as member of the Executive Council and chairs the Standing Field Committee in Economic Theory (2015–18). Moreover, he is a research fellow at CESifo and has been a research fellow at the Centre for Economic Policy Research (CEPR). Furthermore, since 2015, he has also been serving on the Council of the Game Theory Society (2015–21). Finally, Nöldeke currently performs editorial duties for the Journal of the European Economic Association, Games and Theoretical Economics, and has worked in the past in editorial positions for academic journals such as Econometrica, European Economic Review, Review of Economic Studies, and International Economic Review.

Georg Nöldeke is married and has two children.

== Research ==
Georg Nöldeke's research focuses on microeconomic theory in general and game and contract theory in particular. Key contributions of his research include:

- In Hart's and Moore's model of the hold-up problem simple option contracts giving the seller the right to make the delivery decision and specify payments depending on whether the delivery taking place is sufficient to make renegotiation superfluous (with Klaus M. Schmidt).
- Contingent ownership (as found in e.g. joint ventures) wherein one party owns the firm initially but the other party has the option to buy the firm at a set price at a later date yields first-best investments in a hold-up problem model with sequential investments and a joint surplus (with Klaus M. Schmidt).
- The limiting distribution of a dynamic evolutionary process driven by stochastic learning and rate mutations in a class of extensive-form games with perfect information always includes the subgame perfect equilibrium outcome but also includes other outcomes unless stringent conditions are met (with Larry Samuelson).
- As the frequency of firms' wage offers in a dynamic labour market increases, any equilibrium that satisfies the Kohlberg-Mertens criterion of an independent never weak best response results (in expectation) in the unique stable outcome of the static Spence model of labour market signalling, wherein workers completely reveal their productivity (with Eric van Damme).
