= Guoqiang Tian =

Chinese-American economist

- 田国强
- Born: 1956 (age 69–70); Gong'an County, Hubei, China
- Occupation: Economist

Academic background
- Education: Huazhong University of Science and Technology (M.A.); University of Minnesota (Ph.D.)
- Thesis: Nash-Implementation of Social Choice Correspondences by Complete Feasible Continuous Outcome Functions.
- Doctoral advisor: Leonid Hurwicz

Academic work
- Discipline: Economics
- Institutions: Texas A&M University Peking University; Hong Kong University of Science and Technology Huazhong University of Science and Technology

Guoqiang Tian (Chinese: 田国强; born 1956) is a American economist. He is Professor of Economics at Texas A&M University. He was Honorary Dean of Institute for Advanced Research at Shanghai University of Finance and Economics from 2006-2022.

Tian's research is focused on mechanism design theory, game theory, auction theory, matching theory, mathematical economics, market-oriented economic transition and Chinese economy. He has worked on mechanism design in various settings including optimal and dynamic contract design, the existence of Nash equilibrium in discontinuous games, auction with participation costs, matching issues, full characterization on fixed-point theorems and related theorems, and China's transition to a modern market economy. He has published over 90 articles in international journals and over 90 articles in Chinese journals.

In 2015, Tian received the Sun Yefang Award, the highest honor in economic science in China for his book China's Reform: History, Logic and Future. He received the Annual Great Thinker award by the China Business Network in 2016. He is a National Special-Term expert in economics of China, and serves as Editor of Frontiers of Economics in China and Co-editor of Annals of Economics and Finance.

== Early life and education ==
Tian was born in 1956 in Gong'an County, Hubei, China. Tian received a Graduation Certificate in Mathematics in 1980 and an M.A. in mathematics in 1982, both from Huazhong University of Science and Technology. He then moved to the United States in 1983, where he received a Ph.D. in Economics under the supervision of Leonid Hurwicz from the University of Minnesota in 1987. His thesis was entitled 'Nash-Implementation of Social Choice Correspondences by Complete Feasible Continuous Outcome Functions', which received the Alfred P. Sloan Doctoral Dissertation Fellowship.

== Career ==
After completing his Ph.D., Tian joined Texas A&M University as an assistant professor in 1987, becoming associate professor in 1991 and full professor in 1995. From 1995 to 2001, he was also a research fellow of the Private Enterprise Research Center and from 1996 to 2002, the holder of the Lewis Faculty Fellowship in College of Liberal Arts at Texas A&M University. He held the Alfred F. Chalk Professor of Economics at the Department of Economics from 2013-23.

Throughout his career, Tian has been involved with various Chinese universities. He was an adjunct professor at Peking University (1999 to 2002), and was an adjunct professor at Hong Kong University of Science and Technology from 2005 to 2020. He was a special-term professor at Tsinghua University (2002 to 2004). He was an adjunct professor at Huazhong University of Science and Technology from 1993 to 2008 and was the executive director of Economics Research Center at the institute from 1999 to 2004. Besides, he was an advisor at the International Technology and Economy Institute, Development Research Center of the State Council of China from 2000 to 2004.

Tian was the honorary dean of the School of Economics at Shanghai University of Finance and Economics from 2004 to 2019, where he initiated an education reform to recruit well-trained PhDs from overseas to promote modern economics education in China geared to international academic standards. He has been the honorary dean of the Institute of Advanced Research at Shanghai University of Finance and Economics since 2006. In 2005, he was endowed the Chang Jiang Distinguished Adjunct Professorship, which is the highest rank of professorship available to a social scientist in China.

Tian has been the editor of Frontiers of Economics in China since 2011 and the co-editor of Annals of Economics and Finance since 2000.

== Research ==
=== Characterization of the existence of equilibrium in discontinuous games ===
A significant part of Tian's research has been focused on characterization of the existence of equilibrium in discontinuous games. Tian and his co-authors systematically studied the existence of Nash equilibrium in discontinuous games, and characterized the existence of Nash equilibrium by weakening the traditional continuity, convexity and transitivity assumptions. By using very weak properties of continuity, convexity and transitivity: transfer continuity, transfer convexity, and transfer transitivity, he, along with Michael R. Baye and Jianxin Zhou, was the first to characterize the existence of Nash equilibria for discontinuous and non-convex games.

In a paper published in 2015 entitled 'On The Existence of Equilibria in Games with Arbitrary Strategy Spaces and Preferences', Tian provided a full characterization on the existence of Nash equilibria in games with arbitrary strategy spaces and preferences that may be non-total, non-transitive, discontinuous, non-convex, or non-monotonic.

=== Mechanism design ===
In the early 1990s, a lot of Tian's work dealt with the topic of better mechanism design. In a series of papers published in the early 1990s, Tian provided various mechanisms with nice properties of continuity, individual feasibility, balancedness, and a small dimension of message spaces, which implement Walrasian or Lindahl allocations.

In two papers, published in 1990 and 1991, Tian provided actual mechanisms with a minimal dimension of message space that implement Lindahl allocations being the same as the minimal dimension to realize Lindahl allocations without considering incentives. For preferences that are non-total or non-transitive, decreasing returns to scale, and the initial endowments that are private information, Tian and his co-authors gave similar mechanisms in a series of papers in the early 1990s. In economies with increasing returns to scale where competitive markets fail, Tian gave an incentive compatible mechanism that implements marginal cost pricing equilibrium allocations in a 2009 paper entitled Implementation in economies with non-convex production technologies unknown to the designer.

=== China's marketization reform ===
Tian has not only contributed to economic theories, but has also studied the smooth economic transition and market-oriented economic reform in China. In 2001, he wrote 'A Theory of Ownership Arrangements and Smooth Transition to a Free Market Economy', in which he offered a rationale for gradual privatization in transitional economies through studying property rights structures by a theoretical model for determining the optimal ownership arrangements in transitional economies in general, and the Chinese economy in particular. Tian argued that ownership arrangements should be functions of the varying degree of imperfection of the institutional environment. It shows that an ownership arrangement may not be changed effectively without changing economic and political institutional environments. As such, he proposed a theory of the three stages for the smooth transition of China's economic system: liberalization, marketization and privatization.

Echoing with China's reform and opening-up initiative, in 1993 Tian co-edited A Series of Popular Economics Books for Institutional Transition in China (14 volumes), which was awarded China's National Book Award in 1994.

In 2014, Tian published the book China's Reform: History, Logic and Future. It offers a review of China's marketization endeavor with theoretic insights and practical policy implications.

== Awards and honors ==
- 1987 - Alfred P. Sloan Doctoral Dissertation Fellowship
- 1992 - Elected Fellow of Chinese Economists Society
- 1994 - National Book Award of China
- 2002 - Best Paper Award, China Economic Quarterly
- 2015 - Sun Yefang Prize
- 2016 - Annual Great Thinker, China Business Network

== Publications ==
=== Books ===
- Market Economics for the Masses (with Fan Zhang) (1993) (in Chinese)
- Characterizations of Fixed Point Theorems, Optimization, and General Equilibria (2000)
- Incentive-Compatibility, Informational Efficiency, and Economic Mechanism Design (2000)
- China's Education Reform: Philosophy, Strategy and Practice (2014) (in Chinese)
- China's Reform: History, Logic and Future (with Xudong Chen) (2014), reprinted in 2016 (in Chinese)
- Advanced Microeconomics (2016) (in Chinese)
- Collected Works of Guoqiang Tian (2018) (in Chinese)

=== Selected articles ===
- Tian, G. (1989). Implementation of the Lindahl Correspondence by a Single-Valued, Feasible and Continuous Mechanism. Review of Economic Studies, 56, 613–621.
- Tian, G. (1990). Completely feasible and continuous implementation of the Lindahl correspondence with a message space of minimal dimension. Journal of Economic Theory, 51(2), 443–452.
- Zhou, J., & Tian, G. (1992). Transfer Method for Characterizing the Existence of Maximal Elements of Binary Relations on Compact or Noncompact Sets. SIAM Journal on Optimization, 2(3), 360–375.
- Tian, G., & Zhou, J. (1992). The maximum theorem and the existence of Nash equilibrium of (generalized) games without lower semicontinuities. Journal of Mathematical Analysis and Applications, 166(2), 351–364.
- Baye, M. R., Tian, G., & Zhou, J. (1993). Characterizations of the Existence of Equilibria in Games with Discontinuous and Non-quasiconcave Payoffs. Review of Economic Studies, 60(4), 935–948.
- Tian, G. (1993). Necessary and Sufficient Conditions for Maximization of a Class of Preference Relations. Review of Economic Studies, 60, 949–958.
- Tian, G., & Zhou, J. (1995). Transfer continuities, generalizations of the Weierstrass and maximum theorems: A full characterization. Journal of Mathematical Economics, 24(3), 281–303.
- Tian, G. (2000). Property Rights and the Nature of Chinese Collective Enterprises. Journal of Comparative Economics, 28(2), 247–268.
- Tian, G. (2001). A Theory of Ownership Arrangements and Smooth Transition to A Free Market Economy. Journal of Institutional and Theoretical Economics, 157, 380–412.
- Tian, G. (2004). A Unique Informationally Efficient Allocation Mechanism in Economies with Consumption Externalities. International Economic Review, 45, 79–111.
- Tian, G. (2009).Implementation in Economies with Non-Convex Production Technologies Unknown to the Designer. Games and Economic Behavior, 66, 526–545.
- Cao, X., & Tian, G. (2010). First Price Auctions with Participation Costs. Games and Economic Behavior, 69, 258–273.
- Chipman, J. S., & Tian, G. (2012). Detrimental Externalities, Pollution Rights, and the "Coase Theorem". Economic Theory, 49, 309–327.
- Jiao, Z., & Tian, G. (2017).The Blocking Lemma and Group Strategy-Proofness in Many-to-Many Matchings. Games and Economic Behavior, 102, 44–55.
- Tian, G. (2017). Full Characterizations of Minimax Inequality, Fixed Point Theorem, Saddle Point Theorem, and KKM Principle in Arbitrary Topological Spaces. Journal of Fixed Point Theory and Applications, 19, 1679–1693.
- Huang, C., & Tian, G. (2017). Guaranteed Size Ratio of Ordinally Efficient and Envy-free Mechanisms in the Assignment Problem. Games and Economic Behavior, 105, 1–8.
