= Corisk Index =

The Corisk Index is the first economic indicator of industry risk assessments related to COVID-19. In contrast to conventional economic climate indexes, e.g. the Ifo Business Climate Index or Purchasing Managers' Index, the CoRisk Index relies on automatically retrieved company filings. The index has been developed by a team of researchers at the Oxford Internet Institute, University of Oxford, and the Hertie School of Governance in March 2020. It gained international media attention as an up-to-date empirical source for policy makers and researchers investigating the economic repercussions of the Coronavirus Recession.

== Methodology ==
The index is calculated with the use of company 10-k risk reports filed to the U.S. Securities and Exchange Commission (SEC). The CoRisk Index is calculated industry-specific as a geometric mean of three measures: $CoRisk Index = \sqrt[2]{k+n}$, where k refers to the average industry count of Corona-related keywords used in each report and n represents the average industry share of negative keywords in Corona-related sentences.
