= Ritva Reinikka =

Finnish developmental economist

Ritva Sinikka Reinikka also known as Reinikka-Soininen is a Finnish economist, known for her work with the World Bank, particularly in the field of African development.

== Early life and education ==
Ritva Reinikka completed her early education at the Kouvola Comprehensive School in Finland. She then pursued higher education at the Helsinki School of Economics, where she obtained a master's degree majoring in economic geography and minoring in business administration. In 1978, Reinikka joined the Development Cooperation Department of the Finnish Ministry for Foreign Affairs. From 1982 to 1983 she worked for the United Nations Children's Fund in Lesotho. Afterwards, she undertook further studies in economics at the University of Montreal during the academic year 1983–1984. She graduated as a Licentiate of Economics and Business Administration from Helsinki School of Economics in 1990. Reinikka then pursued her doctoral studies at Oxford University, working under the guidance of Professor Paul Collier. In 1993, she defended her doctoral thesis titled "Credibility, speculation and the speed of trade liberalization with an application to Kenya."

== World Bank ==
Following the completion of her doctorate, Reinikka joined the Centre for the Study of African Economies at Oxford University. Shortly thereafter, in 1993, she embarked on a career with the World Bank as an economist, focusing primarily on East Africa. Over the years, Reinikka held various positions within the institution, including research manager for the World Bank's Development Research Group, director for Africa and the Middle East and North Africa, and country manager for Southern Africa.

Until the end of 2013, Reinikka served as the director of the World Bank's Human Development Programme for Africa, overseeing and implementing projects aimed at improving the quality of life and well-being of African populations. In 2013, she transitioned to working as an independent development economist. Reinikka also contributed her expertise as a special advisor to the European Union Commissioner for International Partnership. In 2019, she took on a professorship at the Aalto University School of Business as Professor of Practice in developmental economics.

== Accolades and recognition ==
In 2002, she received the World Bank President's Award of Excellence, acknowledging her outstanding achievements and dedication to her work. In 2014, the Finnish Cultural Foundation awarded her the Prize of the Finnish Cultural Foundation highlighting the significant impact of her research, particularly in terms of promoting more efficient utilisation of tax funds and development grants in developing countries. In 2022, Reinikka was jointly awarded the Lifetime Achievement Award by the Yrjö Jahnsson Foundation, along with Pertti Haaparanta.
