= Roman Inderst =

German economist (born 1970)

- Born: 13 April 1970 (age 56)

Academic background
- Education: University of Mannheim; Free University of Berlin; Humboldt University of Berlin
- Influences: Benny Moldovanu

Academic work
- Discipline: Financial economics
- Institutions: Goethe University Frankfurt
- Awards: Leibniz Prize (2010); Gossen Prize (2010)
- Website: Information at IDEAS / RePEc

Roman Inderst (born 13 April 1970) is a German economist who holds the chair for finance and economics at the Goethe University Frankfurt. His research interests include corporate finance, banking, competition policy, and information economics. According to the Handelsblatt, Inderst is the most influential German-speaking economist.

Inderst obtained a Bachelor of Arts in business administration from Reutlingen University, a Magister Artium in sociology from Fernuniversität Hagen, and a Diplom in economics from Humboldt University of Berlin. He then received his Doctor of Philosophy in economics from Free University of Berlin, and his Habilitation under supervision of Benny Moldovanu at the University of Mannheim.

In 2010, Inderst was one of ten scientists awarded with the Gottfried Wilhelm Leibniz Prize. He also won the 2010 Gossen Prize, awarded by the Verein für Socialpolitik.
