= Alan M. Taylor =

American economist

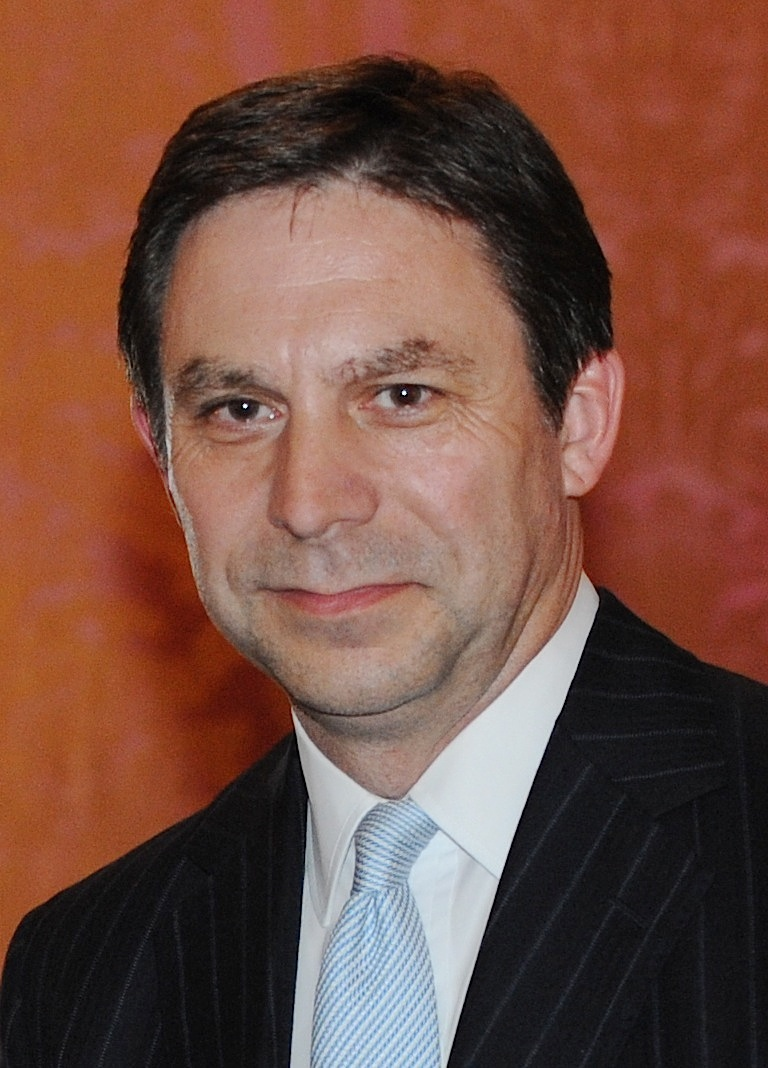
- Alan Taylor at an NBER–Bank of England conference, London, 15 September 2011
- Born: 15 November 1964 (age 62); Wakefield, West Riding of Yorkshire, England
- Citizenship: British/American

Academic background
- Education: King's College, Cambridge (BA); Harvard University (PhD)
- Doctoral advisor: Jeffrey G. Williamson
- Influences: Maurice Obstfeld

Academic work
- Discipline: Macroeconomics; International economics Financial economics Monetary economics Economic history
- Institutions: Columbia University (2024–); University of California, Davis (now emeritus); Centre for Economic Policy Research (2003-); National Bureau of Economic Research (1999–)
- Awards: Engerman-Goldin Prize, Economic History Association (2022); Guggenheim Fellowship (2004)
- Website: Information at IDEAS / RePEc

Alan M. Taylor (born 15 November 1964) is an economist, academic, and policymaker. He is a professor at Columbia University School of International and Public Affairs. He is also a Research Associate at the National Bureau of Economic Research and a Research Fellow at the Centre for Economic Policy Research.

On 16 August 2024 Chancellor of the Exchequer Rachel Reeves appointed Taylor to be an external member of the Monetary Policy Committee of the Bank of England with effect from September 2024.

== Early life and career ==
Born and raised in Yorkshire, Taylor attended Queen Elizabeth Grammar School, Wakefield, and went up to King's College, Cambridge, on an Open Scholarship. In the Mathematical Tripos he graduated as a Wrangler in 1987 and enrolled at Harvard University on being awarded the Joseph Hodges Choate Memorial Fellowship. At Harvard he earned a Ph.D. in economics in 1992, specializing in economic history and international economics; he studied with and was influenced by Jeffrey G. Williamson and Maurice Obstfeld. After completing pre- and post-doctoral fellowships in the Harvard Academy Scholars Program, he has held appointments in the economics departments at Northwestern University, University of Virginia, and University of California, Davis. He was named a Guggenheim Fellow in 2004. He has also held several visiting appointments, including at Stanford University, the Bank of England, the Federal Reserve Bank of San Francisco, and London Business School. He has also served as senior advisor at Morgan Stanley, PIMCO, and McKinsey.

== Research ==
Taylor has authored or edited 11 books and over 90 journal articles covering international economics, trade, finance, growth, and macroeconomics—often linking these topics with economic history. He has lectured and been a visiting scholar at central banks and international organizations, served on numerous editorial boards, and received multiple grants—including several from the National Science Foundation and additional funding from bodies such as the Alfred P. Sloan Foundation and the Institute for New Economic Thinking. He is the author, with Robert Feenstra, of the widely used textbook International Economics (Worth Publishers).

=== Economic history of Argentina ===
In the 1990s Taylor made contributions to Argentine economic history, starting with his thesis research which was awarded the Gerschenkron Prize by the Economic History Association. His work focused on long-term real and financial factors in slow development after 1914, and he challenged the conventional view that relative divergence began only after 1945 in the Perón era and later. He went on to collaborate extensively with Gerardo della Paolera, with whom he wrote several papers, published one book (Straining at the Anchor, University of Chicago Press), and one edited volume (A New Economic History of Argentina, Cambridge University Press). Their work was recognized with the Cole Prize by the Economic History Association.

=== The trilemma ===
In the mid-1990s Taylor began a fruitful collaboration with Obstfeld tackling the evolution of global financial integration and macroeconomics in the very long run. Their work was recognized with the Sanwa Prize and published in several articles and a book (Global Capital Markets, Cambridge University Press). In 1997, Obstfeld and Taylor were the first to introduce the now-standard term "trilemma" into economics, which is used to describe the macroeconomic policy tradeoff between fixed exchange rates, open capital markets, and monetary policy autonomy. In work with Jay Shambaugh, they developed the first methods to empirically validate this central, yet hitherto untested, hypothesis in international macroeconomics.

=== Economics of exchange rates ===
Since the late 1990s Taylor has a strand of work focusing on exchange rate economics. He has written several influential papers looking at the long-run behavior of exchange rates and the purchasing-power parity hypothesis. More recently he has written on the short-run behavior of exchange rates, in particular to evaluate the carry trade and other currency trading strategies. In both short- and long-run settings he has explored the role of nonlinear dynamics in exchange rate determination. His main collaborators in this area have been Obstfeld, Mark Taylor (no relation) and Òscar Jordà.

=== Credit, financial crises, and the macroeconomy ===
Taylor's work since the 2008 financial crisis has looked at the role of bank lending as it relates to financial crisis events and recessions. The team of Taylor and Moritz Schularick constructed the first long-run dataset of aggregate bank credit for 14 countries dating back 1870, and in their 2012 paper ("Credit Booms Gone Bust," American Economic Review) they showed not only how credit had grown to unprecedented levels in the advanced economies in 2008, but that throughout modern history rates of credit expansion have been a robust predictor of financial crises. Collaborating with Jordà they have shown that more intense credit booms tend to result in longer and more painful recessions, all else equal, a pattern that is consistent with the deep post-2008 downturns seen in many advanced economies.

== Awards and honors ==
- 2022 - Engerman-Goldin Prize from the Economic History Association (with Òscar Jordà and Moritz Schularick)
- 2018 - Nobel Symposium on Money and Banking, Swedish House of Finance, Stockholm School of Economics
- 2004 - Guggenheim Fellowship, John Simon Guggenheim Memorial Foundation
- 2000 - Arthur H. Cole Prize, Economic History Association
- 1997-1998 - National Fellow, Hoover Institution, Stanford University
- 1993 - Alexander Gerschenkron Prize, Economic History Association

== Selected publications ==
- Jordà, Òscar; Taylor, Alan M. (2025). "Local Projections". Journal of Economic Literature. 63 (1): 59–110. doi:10.1257/jel.20241521.
- Jordà, Òscar; Taylor, Alan M. (2019). Riders on the Storm (PDF). Challenges for Monetary Policy. Jackson Hole Economic Symposium. Jackson Hole, Wyoming.
- Jordà, Òscar; Knoll, Katharina; Kuvshinov, Dmitry; Schularick, Moritz; Taylor, Alan M. (2019). "The Rate of Return on Everything, 1870–2015". Quarterly Journal of Economics. 134 (3): 1225–1298. doi:10.1093/qje/qjz012.
- Jordà, Òscar; Schularick, Moritz; Taylor, Alan M. (2017). "Macrofinancial History and the New Business Cycle Facts". In Eichenbaum, Martin; Parker, Jonathan A. (eds.). NBER Macroeconomics Annual 2016. Vol. 31. Chicago: University of Chicago Press. pp. 213–263. doi:10.2307/1885395. ISSN 0889-3365.
- Taylor, Alan M. (2015). "Credit, Financial Stability, and the Macroeconomy". Annual Review of Economics. 7: 309–339. doi:10.1146/annurev-economics-080614-115437.
- Schularick, Moritz; Taylor, Alan M. (2012). "Credit Booms Gone Bust: Monetary Policy, Leverage Cycles, and Financial Crises, 1870-2008". American Economic Review. 102 (2): 1029–1061. doi:10.1257/aer.102.2.1029.
