= Inventory planning =

Inventory planning involves using forecasting techniques to estimate the inventory required to meet consumer demand. The process uses data from customer demand patterns, market trends, supply patterns, and historical sales to generate a demand plan that predicts product needs over a specified period.

Using the demand plan, supply chain professionals collaborate with suppliers to ensure timely deliveries, manage warehouse stock levels, and set production schedules.

== Advantages ==
Proper inventory planning provides several advantages. It helps manage cash flow, which is crucial for businesses, especially those with limited capital. Managing inventory costs and sourcing efficient inventory contributes to financial stability. Aligning inventory with market demand improves operational efficiency, as does consistent inventory turnover. However, managing obsolete stock is vital to avoid potential financial issues.

Structured inventory planning can also mitigate the risks of inventory misuse by employees. In situations lacking adequate oversight, potential risks such as theft or unauthorized use can negatively affect financial results.

== Software ==
The use of software can further enhance inventory planning. Some notable software includes Inventory Planner by Sage, SAP IBP, Syrup Tech, and Toolio. Such software also automates various inventory tasks, promoting precise and efficient planning with reduced manual intervention.
