= Claudia Steinwender =

Austrian economist

- Born: Austria
- Occupation: Economist
- Title: Professor of Economics
- Awards: Hermann-Heinrich-Gossen Prize (2025); John Hicks Prize

Academic background
- Education: University of Vienna; Vienna University of Technology; London School of Economics
- Thesis: (2014)

Claudia Steinwender is an Austrian economist who is (as of May 2026) a Professor of Economics at LMU Munich. She specializes in international economics, applied microeconomics, innovation and economic history. In 2025, she was awarded the Hermann-Heinrich-Gossen Prize for her "excellent contributions to empirical trade and innovation economics and the understanding of global economic processes".

== Education ==
Claudia Steinwender studied international business administration from 1998 to 2003 at the University of Vienna, followed by studies in economic mathematics at the Vienna University of Technology from 2002 to 2005. After her studies in Austria, she graduated from the London School of Economics with a MRes and a PhD in economics in 2010 and 2014, respectively. Her dissertation at LSE earned her the John Hicks Prize for Outstanding Doctoral Dissertation.

== Career ==
After a post-doctoral fellowship at Princeton University, she worked as an Assistant Professor at Harvard Business School (2015–2017) and MIT Sloan School of Management (2017–2018), before being appointed the Douglas Drane Career Development Assistant Professor in Information Technology and Management at the latter school in 2018. In 2021, she became a full professor of economics at LMU Munich. As of 2026, Claudia Steinwender maintains affiliations with the Centre for Economic Performance (CEP), the Center for Economic and Policy Research (CEPR) and CESifo, is a Council Member of the European Economic Association (EEA) and member of the editorial boards of several academic journals (e.g., Explorations in Economic History, Review of Economic Studies, etc.).

== Research ==
Claudia Steinwender's research interests include international trade, innovation and productivity, applied microeconometrics and economic history. Notable insights from her research include the following:

- Together with Pian Shu, Steinwender finds that the impact of trade liberalization on firms' productivity and innovation differs depending on the level of development of the country where firms are located and a firm's initial level of productivity: Whereas trade liberalization spurs productivity and innovation in emerging countries and export opportunities and access to imported intermediates foster innovation in developed countries, import competition has mixed effects in developed countries; positive (negative) impacts are amplified for initially more (less) productive firms.
- Investigating the impact of government funding for (especially defense-related) R&D in OECD countries and France in particular with Enrico Moretti and John Van Reenen, Steinwender estimates that, on average, a 10% increase in government-funded R&D generates a 5-6% additional increase in privately funded R&D, suggesting substantial "crowding-in" of private investment. Moreover, they find evidence of international R&D spillovers as well as of productivity gains resulting from the defense-related crowding-in of private R&D by public R&D.
- Exploiting the change in information frictions attributable to the establishment of the transatlantic telegraph in 1866, Steinwender finds that the resulting reduction in information frictions decreased price differences and volatility between the United States and the United Kingdom, and increased both the average levels and volatility of transatlantic trade flows; gains in economic efficiency due to the telegraph's establishment are estimated to amount to 8% of the value of exports.
- In research with César Ducruet, Réka Juhász and Dávid Krisztián Nagy, Steinwender uses the introduction of containerized shipping to explore the effects of port development and estimates that containerization in seaports increased world welfare by 3.4%, as local costs associated with port development reducing the aggregate welfare gains of containerization and offset the positive effect on local market access.
