= Davide Cantoni =

Davide Cantoni is an economist and Professor of Economics and Economic History at LMU Munich (as of August 2026), where he is conducting economic history, political economy and applied macroeconomics. He is the 2019 winner of the Gossen Prize for his "important empirical contributions to [...] economic history and political economy", which "contributes substantially to the understanding of long-term economic development and the dynamics of political change", and of the 2021 Schmölders Prize (together with Jeremiah Dittmar and Noam Yuchtman) for his research on the political economy of secularization in the Protestant Reformation.

== Biography ==
After obtaining a diploma as economist from the University of Mannheim in 2005, where he was a grant recipient of Studienstiftung des deutschen Volkes, Davide Cantoni studied at Harvard University, where he obtained his Ph.D. in economics in 2010. After his graduation, he became an assistant professor at the Pompeu Fabra University in Barcelona, before becoming a professor of economics at LMU Munich in 2015. He has been affiliated with the Centre for Economic Performance (CEPR) in London since 2012 and is a member of the ifo Institute for Economic Research Research Network (since 2012) and of the Bavarian Academy of Sciences and Humanities (since 2020). In terms of professional engagements, he has been an associate editor of Explorations in Economic History and is currently an associate editor of the Journal of the European Economic Association as well as a member of the editorial board of the Review of Economic Studies. Cantoni has repeatedly received prizes for excellence in teaching and refereeing, e.g., the "Prize for Good Teaching of the Free State of Bavaria" or the "Excellence in Refereeing Award" of the American Economic Journal: Applied Economics in 2021.

== Research ==
The research of Davide Cantoni centers on economic history and political economy. In terms of average rank score on IDEAS/RePeC, Cantoni ranks among the top 4% of economists.

=== Research on the Protestant Reformation ===
Exploiting the religious heterogeneity of the Holy Roman Empire from 1300 to 1900 to test the Weber hypothesis in Germany, contrary to earlier research, Cantoni does not find any effect of Protestantism on economic growth. Together with Jeremiah Dittmar and Noam Yuchtman, Cantoni also argues that the religious competition between Catholicism and Protestantism played a key role in the secularization of the West by reducing the power of religious authorities in the market of providing legitimacy to secular rulers and thereby changing the balance of power between secular and religious elites. In particular, Cantoni and his co-authors show how the reallocation of resources from religious to secular authorities and institutions had major societal consequences: students at Protestant universities increasingly studied secular subjects and took secular occupations and investment into new construction shifted towards buildings with secular purposes, including palaces and administrative buildings, consolidating the secularization of society. Finally, Cantoni also showed that a territory's distance to Wittenberg, the city where Martin Luther started the Reformation, is a major determinant for the adoption of Protestantism in the 16th century, consistent with a model of strategic neighbourhood interactions wherein the risk of introducing a religious innovation for local elites depends on whether neighbouring states also adopt the same religious innovation and how powerful those neighbours are.

=== Political economy in China ===
Using a major textbook reform in China that was gradually rolled out in Chinese provinces between 2004 and 2010, Davide Cantoni and his co-authors Yuyu Chen, David Y. Yang, Noam Yuchtman and Y. Jane Zhang find that the curriculum reform often succeeded in shaping students' attitudes, including on China's governance, democracy and free markets, though evidence on students' behaviour is mixed; the study highlights the power of education curricula in the diffusion of ideology. In the context of Hong Kong's anti-authoritarian movement, Cantoni, Yang, Yuchtman and Zhang use an experiment to assess whether individuals' beliefs about others' participation in a protest increases or decreases their likelihood of participating in the protest and find that - contrary to the common assumption of strategic complementarity - individuals are less likely to attend a protest if they believe that many will attend it. By contrast, they also find (together with Leonardo Bursztyn) in the context of the Hong Kong university protests that incentives to attend one protest increase attendance at subsequent protests only when a sufficient fraction of an individual's social network is also incentivized to attend the initial protest, making mobilization at the level of social networks key for persistent political engagement.

=== Other research ===
- Areas in Germany that were occupied by the French after the French Revolution, which removed the legal and economic barriers protecting oligarchies, established equality before the law and thus prepared economies to take advantage of the new industrial opportunities of later 19th century, display more rapid urbanization, especially after 1850, highlighting the socioeconomic consequences of radical reform (Davide Cantoni with Daron Acemoglu, Simon Johnson and James A. Robinson).
- Newly established universities played a key role in enabling medieval Europe's Commercial Revolution by increasing the number of people trained in newly rediscovered Roman and canon law, which in turn helped reduce the uncertainty of trade in the Middle Ages; in particular, it is found that after the papal schism of 1386, which introduced religious competition between the popes of Rome and Avignon and gave secular elites more power to push for the creation of new universities, the trend in the establishment of new markets in Germany increased more where those markets were closely located to where universities had been newly established (Davide Cantoni and Noam Yuchtman).
- No significant impact of prior exposure to Western television on aggregate consumption in post-1989 eastern Germany is found, though exposure is found to bias consumption in favour of categories of goods which were more advertised before reunification until 1998.
