= Georg Weizsäcker =

German economist

Georg Heinrich von Weizsäcker (born October 10, 1973) is a German economist and currently the Professor for Microeconomic Theory and Applications at the Humboldt University of Berlin. His research interests include microeconomics, experimental economics, financial decision making, game theory and decision theory. In 2017, Weizsäcker's contributions to a better understanding of expectations formation and decisions under uncertainty were awarded the Gossen Prize.

== Biography ==
Georg Weizsäcker earned a diploma in economics from the Humboldt University of Berlin in 1999, followed by a M.A. and a Ph.D. in business economics from Harvard University in 2004. After his graduation, Weizsäcker worked first as a lecturer, reader and later professor at the London School of Economics (2004–10) and University College London (2010–13). Since 2012, he has worked as professor at Humbold University. In Berlin, he is also engaged in the Graduate Center of the DIW Berlin, whose dean he has been since 2017. In terms of professional service, Weizsäcker performs editorial duties for the journal Games and Economic Behavior and Experimental Economics and has done so for the Review of Economic Studies, Economic Journal and Management Science in the past.

Georg Weizsäcker's partner is fellow economist Dorothea Kübler, with whom he has two children.

== Research ==
Georg Weizsäcker's research focuses on behavioral and experimental economics. Among the key findings of his research are that

- Private information on signals fails to cascade among individuals due to the limited depths of individuals' chains of reasoning (with Dorothea Kübler).
- Individuals' actions in normal-form games systematically diverge from their stated beliefs, which reveal greater strategic depth (with Miguel Costa-Gomes).
- In an experiment, 89% of individuals are found to evaluate decisions separately instead of jointly ("narrow bracketing"), in line with preferences predicted by prospect theory (with Matthew Rabin).
- In social learning games, players are found not to follow others in the majority of cases when doing so would be optimal but contradicts the information given to the players.
- In two-person normal-form games, players choose actions consistent with significant underestimations of their opponents' rationality.
