= Mathias Dewatripont =

Belgian economist

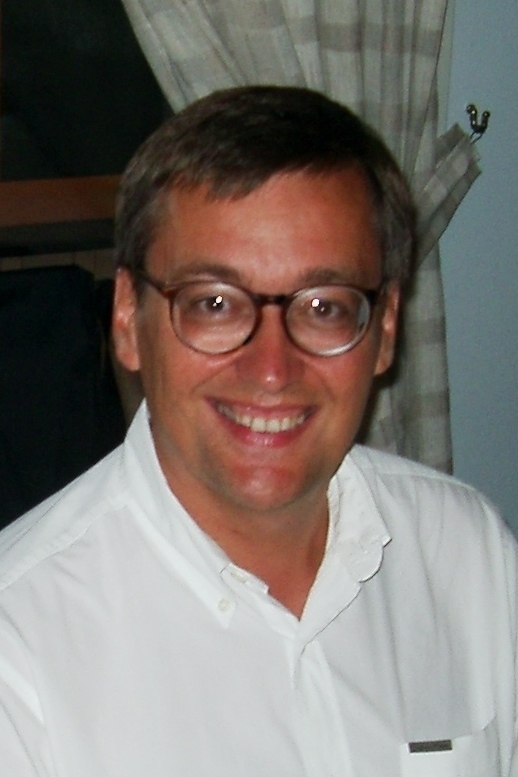
- Born: 27 December 1959 (age 66); Brussels, Belgium

Academic background
- Education: Harvard University; Université Libre de Bruxelles
- Doctoral advisor: Eric Maskin; Andreu Mas-Colell

Academic work
- Discipline: Microeconomics; Industrial Organization
- Institutions: Université Libre de Bruxelles; Massachusetts Institute of Technology; National Bank of Belgium
- Awards: Yrjö Jahnsson Award (2003); Francqui Prize (1998)
- Website: Information at IDEAS / RePEc

Mathias François Dewatripont (born 27 December 1959) is a Belgian economist and professor at the Université libre de Bruxelles (ULB) and visiting professor at the Massachusetts Institute of Technology (MIT).

He studied economics at the ULB, and obtained a PhD at Harvard University (United States) in 1986 (under the supervision of Eric Maskin and Andreu Mas-Colell). He is a member of the Economic Advisory Group for Competition Policy of the DG Competition (European Commission), since 2004. He is a member of European Commission President José Manuel Durão Barroso's Group of Economic Policy Analysis, since 2005. In 2005, he was President of the European Economic Association. He is a member of the Econometric Society and Research Director at CEPR.

He is one of the 22 members of the Scientific Council of the European Research Council.

He is member of the Académie Royale de Belgique and has been elected Foreign Honorary Member of the American Academy of Arts and Sciences (April 2009).

In 1998, he was awarded the Francqui Prize on Human Sciences, and in 2003 he received the Yrjö Jahnsson Award.

He was Chairman of the Oxera Economic Council. He is member of the Scientific Council of the Toulouse School of Economics, member of the Scientific Council of the Barcelona Graduate School of Economics, member of the Scientific Council of CentER (Tilburg University), and Chairman of the Scientific Council of the ULB Foundation.

He is Deputy Chairman (2008–09), Chairman (2009–10) and Dean (2010–11) of the Solvay Brussels School of Economics and Management (SBS-EM) of the Université libre de Bruxelles (ULB).

He has been member of the Haut Conseil de la Science et de la Technologie, Ministère français de l'Enseignement supérieur et de la Recherche, since 2009.

He has been appointed Executive Director of the National Bank of Belgium since April 2011.

== Selected works ==
- On the Theory of Commitment, with Applications to the labor Market (Contract Theory, Labor Unions). PhD dissertation, Harvard University, United States—Massachusetts, 1986.

Published as: Dewatripont, Mathias (1989). "Renegotiation and Information Revelation over Time: The Case of Optimal Labor Contracts". The Quarterly Journal of Economics. 104 (3): 589–619. doi:10.2307/2937812. JSTOR 2937812.

- La Réglementation Prudentielle des Banques, (with J. Tirole), Payot, Lausanne, 1993.
- The Prudential Regulation of Banks, (with J. Tirole, expanded English version of La Réglementation Prudentielle des Banques), MIT Press, Cambridge, 1994 (also translated in Japanese (1996), Italian (1998) and Chinese (2002)).
- Contract Theory, (with P. Bolton), MIT Press, Cambridge, 2005 (also translated in Chinese (2008)).
- Macroeconomic Stability and Financial Regulation: Key Issues for the G20, co-auteurs: X. Freixas & R. Portes, VoxEU & CEPR ebook, 2009
- Bailing out the Banks: Reconciling Stability and Competition: An analysis of state-supported schemes for financial institutions, co-auteurs: T. Beck, D. Coyle, X. Freixas & P. Seabright, CEPR, London, 2010.
- Balancing the Banks: Global Lessons from the Financial Crisis, co-auteurs: J.-C. Rochet & J. Tirole, Princeton University Press, 2010.
