= Botond Kőszegi =

Hungarian-born American economist

- Born: November 18, 1973 (age 52)

Academic background
- Education: MIT; Harvard University
- Doctoral advisor: Peter Diamond; Jon Gruber

Academic work
- Discipline: Behavioral Economics
- Institutions: University of Bonn; Central European University
- Awards: Yrjö Jahnsson Award

Botond Kőszegi (born November 18, 1973) is an economist and a professor at the University of Bonn and at the Central European University (on leave). In April 2026 Botond was appointed as co-editor of the American Economic Review, starting January 1, 2027.

== Early life and education ==
A bronze medallist in the International Math Olympiad 1991, Kőszegi graduated magna cum laude in mathematics from Harvard University in 1996 and earned a PhD in economics from the Massachusetts Institute of Technology in 2000.

== Career ==
After completing his PhD, Kőszegi joined the faculty of UC Berkeley. In 2002–03, he was also a visiting faculty member at his alma mater MIT. In 2012, he became a professor at Central European University while remaining a professor at UC Berkeley until 2013. He has been a full professor at the University of Bonn since 2022.

=== Scholarship ===
Kőszegi is a theoretical economist with an interest in behavioral economics, who has studied, among other topics, temporal utility and addiction.

According to Kőszegi, behavioral economics is not so much a branch of economics, as an attitude of the economists engaged in studying it. "Behaviorists simply strive to start from the most realistic human behavior possible." Further, while the notion of nudging popularized by Richard H. Thaler and Cass R. Sunstein paints behavioral economists as libertarian paternalists, Kőszegi says that behaviorists are generally afraid of paternalism.

Together with Matthew Rabin, Kőszegi developed a formal model to address criticisms of prospect theory. This work has been discussed in behavioral economics.

Along with Paul Heidhues, Kőszegi has done work on the economic implications of consumer naivete. This joint work shows that, while laissez-faire regulation is usually considered synonymous with competitive markets, for complex products the right regulations can foster, and are necessary for, competition. For example, in complex markets that require a high level of research from customers to get a good deal, price caps can be effective both in helping the less well-off and also in boosting competition.

The ranking system of RePEc puts Kőszegi in the top 5% of economists for 31 of its criteria, including Number of Citations and h-index, among others.

=== Awards ===
In 2015, the Yrjö Jahnsson Foundation awarded Kőszegi its biennial Yrjö Jahnsson Award, which is given to "young European economists who have made a significant contribution to theoretical and applied research in terms of the study of economics in Europe." Kőszegi received the award "for his contribution to the theoretical foundations of behavioral economics, and its application to public finance and contract theory." He is also a fellow of the European Economic Association.
