= Yrjö Jahnsson Foundation =

Finnish charitable foundation

The Yrjö Jahnsson Foundation is a charitable foundation whose aims are to promote Finnish research in economics and medicine and to maintain and support educational and research facilities in Finland. It was established in 1954 by the wife of Yrjö Jahnsson, Hilma Jahnsson. It supports the award of the Yrjö Jahnsson Award and Yrjö Jahnsson Lecture series. These lectures have been delivered by noteworthy economists since 1963. 10 of the Yrjö Jahnsson Lecture series scholars have gone on to win the Nobel prize in economics, making it a top predictor for future recipients.

== The Yrjö Jahnsson Lecture series ==
Source: Yrjö Jahnsson Foundation

- 1963 Kenneth J. Arrow Aspects of the Theory of Risk-Bearing
- 1967 Assar Lindbeck Monetary-Fiscal Analysis and General Equilibrium
- 1968 L.R. Klein An Essay on the Theory of Economic Prediction
- 1970 Harry G. Johnson The Two-Sector Model of General Equilibrium
- 1973 John Hicks The Crisis in Keynesian Economics
- 1976 Edmond Malinvaud The Theory of Unemployment Reconsidered
- 1978 James Tobin Asset Accumulation and Economic Activity
- 1980 János Kornai Growth, Shortage and Efficiency
- 1983 Jacques H. Drèze Labour Management, Contracts and Capital Markets
- 1985 Robert E. Lucas Models of Business Cycles
- 1987 Amartya Sen Rational Behaviour
- 1990 A.B. Atkinson Poverty in Europe
- 1992 Bengt Holmström Models of the Firm
- 1996 Paul R. Krugman Economic Theory and the East Asia Miracle
- 1999 Hans-Werner Sinn The New Systems Competition
- 2002 Alvin Roth The Timing of Transactions: Strategic behavior, and market performance
- 2005 Ricardo Caballero Macroeconomics and Restructuring in the Global Economy
- 2007 Peter Diamond Thinking about Taxes
- 2010 Tim Besley, Torsten Persson Pillars of Prosperity: The political economics of state building
- 2012 John A. List Using Field Experiments in Economics
- 2015 Nicholas Bloom, John van Reenen Management and the Wealth of Nations
- 2019 Daron Acemoglu, The Future of Work
- 2023 Janet Currie, Child Health as Human Capital and The Environment and Children’s Health

== Yrjö Jahnsson Award ==
The Yrjö Jahnsson Award is a biennial award given by the Finnish Yrjö Jahnsson Foundation to European economists under the age of 45 "who have made a contribution in theoretical and applied research that is significant to the study of economics in Europe." The selection committee, chaired by the president of the EEA, consists of five members, four nominated by the European Economic Association (EEA) and one by the Yrjö Jahnsson Foundation. The selection committee consults all EEA fellows individually and uses their responses together with their own judgment to form a short list.

=== Recipients ===
Source: Yrjö Jahnsson Foundation

Year	Medalists	Institution (at time of receipt)	Alma mater (PhD)	Nationality	Nobel Prize
1993	Jean-Jacques Laffont	Toulouse School of Economics	Harvard University	France	
1993	Jean Tirole	Toulouse School of Economics	MIT	France	2014
1995	Richard Blundell	University College London	London School of Economics	UK	
1997	Torsten Persson	Stockholm University	Stockholm University	Sweden	
1999	Nobuhiro Kiyotaki	London School of Economics	Harvard University	Japanese	
1999	John Moore	London School of Economics	London School of Economics	UK	
2001	Philippe Aghion	University College London	Harvard University	France	2025
2001	Guido Tabellini	Bocconi University	UCLA	Italy	
2003	Mathias Dewatripont	Université libre de Bruxelles	Harvard University	Belgium	
2005	Tim Besley	London School of Economics	Oxford University	UK	
2005	Jordi Galí	Universitat Pompeu Fabra	MIT	Spain	
2007	Gilles Saint-Paul	Paris School of Economics	MIT	France	
2009	John van Reenen	London School of Economics	University College London	UK	
2009	Fabrizio Zilibotti	University of Zurich	London School of Economics	Italy	
2011	Armin Falk	University of Bonn	University of Zurich	Germany	
2013	Hélène Rey	London Business School	London School of Economics	France	
2013	Thomas Piketty	Paris School of Economics	London School of Economics	France	
2015	Botond Kőszegi	Central European University	MIT	Hungary	
2017	Ran Spiegler	Tel-Aviv University	Tel-Aviv University	Israel	
2017	Michèle Tertilt	University of Mannheim	University of Minnesota	Germany	
2019	Oriana Bandiera	London School of Economics	Boston College	Italy	
2019	Imran Rasul	University College London	London School of Economics	UK	
2021	Ricardo Reis	London School of Economics	Harvard University	Portugal	
2021	Silvana Tenreyro	London School of Economics	Harvard University	Argentina	
2023	Jan De Loecker	K.U. Leuven	K.U. Leuven	Belgium	
2023	Kalina Manova	UCL	Harvard University	Bulgaria	
2025	Julia Cagé	Sciences Po	Harvard University	France	
2025	David Yanagizawa-Drott	University of Zurich	Stockholm University	Sweden	

== See also ==
- List of economics awards
- John Bates Clark Medal
- Gossen Prize
