= Yrjö Jahnsson =

Yrjö Waldemar Jahnsson (28 July 1877 Turku – 11 May 1936 Helsinki) was a Finnish economist who served as professor of economics at the Helsinki University of Technology from 1911 until his death. He openly criticized the strict monetary policy of the "orthodox" government and central bank in the early 1930s, and was ideologically aligned with the Fennoman movement. Jahnsson achieved business success and amassed a significant fortune during the 1920s and 1930s. His wife, Hilma Jahnsson (1882-1975), used the wealth to establish the Yrjö Jahnsson Foundation.

== Early life and education ==
Jahnsson was the son of the schoolteacher and Doctor of Philosophy Adolf Waldemar Jahnsson and Ida Sofia Magdalena Helander. He matriculated from the Turku Finnish Lyceum in 1895 and completed a Bachelor of Arts degree in history and philosophy at the Imperial Alexander University (today the University of Helsinki) in 1898. He earned his Doctor of Philosophy in 1907 with the dissertation ‘‘Tutkimuksia Suomen kansantaloustieteen historiasta vuosina 1820–1860’’ (‘‘Studies in the History of Finnish Political Economy, 1820–1860’’).

== Career ==
From 1907 to 1910 Jahnsson worked as an actuary at the Statistical Central Office. He was docent of economics at the University of Helsinki (1909–1911) and, after a contested appointment over acting professor Heikki Renvall, professor of economics at the Helsinki University of Technology (1911–1936). The appointment alienated him from the constitutionalist circles to which Renvall belonged, isolating him from many Finnish economists.

In 1924 he founded a private eight-year secondary school, the Helsinki Finnish Private Lyceum, to improve educational opportunities for Finnish-speaking children. Three years later he helped establish Europe’s first evening secondary school for adults, whose evening division remained unique in Finland for almost twenty years.

== Personal life ==
In 1906 Jahnsson married Hilma Gabriella Hägg (1882–1975), later a school counsellor. The couple had no children. Following her husband’s death Hilma donated their estate as the initial capital of the Yrjö Jahnsson Foundation established in 1954.

Jahnsson died in May 1936 of pneumonia following influenza.

== Works ==
- Maanviljelijäin yhteistoiminnasta. Kansantajuisia esitelmiä (1899)
- Raittius ja osuustoiminta (1904)
- Tilattoman väestön lainarahasto ja sen käytäntö (1905)
- Miten on kielikysymyksemme ratkaistava? (1906)
- Torpparikysymys vuoden 1900 valtiopäivillä (1906)
- Ylellisyysasetukset Ruotsissa vapauden ajalla (1906)
- Merkantilismin käsitys kansallisrikkaudesta (1907)
- Piirteitä Suomen kuolleisuussuhteista vuosina 1903–1904 (1907)
- Tilattoman väestön lainarahasto ja sen periaatteet (1907)
- Tutkimuksia Suomen kansantaloustieteen historiasta vuosina 1810–1860 (2 vols., 1907–1908)
- Ehdottoman raittiuden merkitys osuustoiminnalle (1908)
- Kuopion läänin asutuskysymys (1908)
- Läänintilastomme uudestaan järjestämisestä (1908)
- Suomen verotuspolitiikan periaatteista (1908)
- Teollisuustyöväen työsopimusten kestävyysaika Suomen lainsäädännössä (1910)
- Tutkimuksia Suomen teollisuustyöväen suojeluslainsäädännön kehityksestä (1910)
- Mikä tekee Tarton rauhan niin katkeraksi? (1920)
- Turmiollinen lainahanke (1921)
- Onko Suomen Pankki velvoitettava ostamaan rajattomat määrät kultaa? (1925)
- Nykyinen rahapolitiikkamme ja korkea korkotaso (1931)
- Mitä olisi ensi tilassa tehtävä vallitsevan rahankireyden helpottamiseksi? (1932)
- Suomen Pankki ja puolueiden pyhät kissat (posthumous collection, 1999)

== See also ==
Yrjö Jahnsson Foundation
