= Jeffrey G. Williamson =

American economic historian (1935–2026)

Jeffrey Gale Williamson (November 26, 1935 – August 29, 2026) was an American academic and the Laird Bell Professor of Economics (Emeritus), Harvard University; an Honorary Fellow in the Department of Economics at the University of Wisconsin (Madison); Research Associate at the National Bureau of Economic Research; and Research Fellow for the Center for Economic and Policy Research. He also served (1994–1995) as the president of the Economic History Association.

Williamson was considered one of the world's foremost scholars on the economic history of the international economy. His research focused on comparative economic history and the history of the international economy and development.

He was the father of economist Hilary Williamson Hoynes.

== Life and career ==
Williamson was born on November 26, 1935. He was educated at Wesleyan University and Stanford University. Williamson was appointed Assistant Professor of Economics at Vanderbilt University in 1961. In 1963, he moved to University of Wisconsin and taught there until 1983. That year, he joined the Department of Economics at Harvard University, where he was the Laird Bell Professor of Economics. Furthermore, in 1991 he became a Research Associate at the National Bureau of Economic Research. Additionally, in 1994–95 he was President of the Economic History Association. He also served as a consultant and visiting Research Fellow at the World Bank starting in 1976.

Williamson died on August 29, 2026, at the age of 90.

== Selected publications ==
- 1974, Late Nineteenth-Century American Development: A General Equilibrium History. Cambridge University Press.
- 1974, with Allen C. Kelley, Lessons From Japanese Development: An Analytical Economic History. University of Chicago Press.
- with T. Hatton, 1998, The Age of Mass Migration, Oxford
- with P. Aghion, 1998, Growth, Inequality, and Globalization, Mattioli Lectures: Cambridge
- with K. O'Rourke, 1999, Globalization and History, MIT
- with M. Bordo and A. M. Taylor, 2003, Globalization in Historical Perspective, Chicago and NBER
- with Timothy J. Hatton, 2005, Global Migration and the World Economy. Two Centuries of Policy and Performance, The MIT Press.
- 2011, Trade and Poverty: When the Third World Fell Behind. Cambridge, MA: MIT Press.
- with Peter H. Lindert, 2016, Unequal Gains: American Growth and Inequality since 1700. Princeton University Press.

== Festschrift ==
T.J. Hatton. K. H. O'Rourke and A. M. Taylor (eds.), The New Comparative Economic History: Essays in Honor of Jeffrey G. Williamson, Cambridge Mass: MIT Press, 2007
