= Gilles Saint-Paul =

French economist

- Born: 8 February 1963 (age 63); Saint-Étienne, France

Academic background
- Education: École Polytechnique; Massachusetts Institute of Technology
- Doctoral advisor: Olivier Blanchard
- Influences: Michael J. Piore

Academic work
- Discipline: Industrial economics Political economics
- Institutions: Toulouse 1 University Social Sciences
- Awards: Yrjö Jahnsson Award (2007)
- Website: Information at IDEAS / RePEc

Gilles Saint-Paul (born 8 February 1963) is a French economist at Paris School of Economics. He also is a scientific advisor to the Economic Studies Directorate at the French Ministry of the Environment. His main interests include the political economy of unemployment and how information technology affects wage inequality.

== Career ==
After receiving engineering degrees from the Ecole Polytechnique in 1985 and the Ecole des Ponts et Chaussées in 1987, Saint-Paul graduated with a master's degree in applied mathematics from Paris-Dauphine University. Saint-Paul earned his Ph.D. in economics in 1990 at the Massachusetts Institute of Technology, advised by Olivier Blanchard and Michael Piore.

He taught economics at ENSAE ParisTech from 1990 to 1997 and at Pompeu Fabra University from 1997 to 2000. He is a professor at Paris School of Economics since 2006. He also holds the title of Global Professor of Economics at NYU Abu Dhabi.

== Work ==
He has published four books and authored numerous articles in the top journals including a number path breaking contributions on the political economy of labour market reform. He is a CEPR Research Fellow and has been Director of the CEPR Labour Economics Programme since 2001.

== Awards ==
Saint-Paul received the Yrjö Jahnsson Award awarded by the European Economic Association in 2007.
