= Benny Moldovanu =

German economist

Benny Moldovanu (born April 11, 1962) is a German economist who currently holds the Chair of Economic Theory II at the University of Bonn. His research focuses on applied game theory, auction theory, mechanism design, contests and matching theory, and voting theory. In 2004, Moldovanu was awarded the Gossen Prize for his contributions to auction theory and mechanism design.

== Biography ==
Benny Moldovanu earned a BSc and MSc in mathematics from the Hebrew University of Jerusalem in 1986 and 1989, respectively, the latter under the supervision of Bezalel Peleg. He then obtained in 1991 a PhD in economics from the University of Bonn, with future Nobel Memorial Prize winner Reinhard Selten as advisor and Avner Shaked as co-advisor, with thesis "Game theory, economics, social and behavioral sciences". He went on to earn his habilitation from the same university in 1995. Having worked as assistant professor of economics at the University of Bonn after his PhD (1991–1995), he then became full professor at the University of Mannheim (1995–2002) before returning to the University of Bonn in 2002, where he has worked ever since. At Bonn, he has been the Co-Director and later Academic Director of the Bonn Graduate School of Economics (2006–2013) as well as Co-Director of the Hausdorff Center for Mathematics (2006–2013), where he today leads the research area on mechanism design and game theory. Moreover, at Bonn, Moldovanu is currently Director of the Institute of Microeconomics (since 2012) as well as of the Reinhard Selten Institute for Research in Economics (since 2017). Throughout his professional career, Moldovanu has held visiting appointments at the University of Michigan, Ann Arbor, Northwestern University, University College London, Yale University, Tel Aviv University, and the Hebrew University of Jerusalem. In terms of professional activities, he has been a member of the Councils of the European Economic Association and Game Theory Society, is a research fellow at the Centre for Economic Policy Research (CEPR), and has chaired the Scientific Committees of the Econometric Society and German Economic Association. Finally, he has performed editorial duties for Econometrica, Journal of the European Economic Association, Games and Economic Behavior, Journal of Economic Theory, and Economic Policy.

== Research ==
Benny Moldovanu's research focuses on applied game theory, auction theory, mechanism design, contests and matching theory, and voting theory. In his research, he has particularly often collaborated with Philippe Jehiel (Paris School of Economics). According to IDEAS/RePEc, he belongs to the top 3% of economists in terms of research output. In particular, his research has been recognized with the Max Planck Research Prize (2001) and Gossen Prize (2004) as well as fellowships of the Econometric Society (2004), European Economic Association (2009), and Game Theory Society (2017).

=== Research on auctions ===
One major area of Moldovanu's research concerns auction theory, in particular the optimal design of auctions if participation in it subjects (some) participants to externalities. For example, in a study of economic interactions under identity-dependent, asymmetric negative externalities with Philippe Jehiel, Moldovanu finds that some agents' best strategy is to not participate in the market in order to minimize externalities, which may e.g. explain certain features of preemptive patenting. Similarly, Moldovanu, Jehiel and Ennio Stacchetti find that for such economic transactions, e.g. the sale of nuclear weapon, the outside options and participations constraints in a revenue-maximizing auction are endogenous, surplus can be extracted from non-acquiring participants, and the seller may be better off by not selling at all (while obtaining some payments) if externalities are much larger than valuations. Later, Moldovanu, Jehiel and Stacchetti have provided a general theory for the design of incentive compatible mechanisms in auctions with buyer-specific externalities. Moreover, Moldovanu and Jehiel have shown that multi-object auctions cannot be reduced to one-dimensional models without loss of generality because, in the presence of informational and allocative externalities, Bayes-Nash incentive compatible mechanisms exist only if private and social rates of information substitution are congruent, which in turn depends on whether signals are mono- or multi-dimensional. Finally, together with Jehiel, Moritz Meyer-ter-Vehn and William R. Zame, Moldovanu has explored the limits of ex post implementation, which requires each agents' strategy to be optimal for every possible realization of other agents' types.

=== Research on contests and matching ===
Another major area of Moldovanu's research regards the design of contests and assortative matching. Studying the optimal allocation of prizes in contests with multiple, nonidentical prizes, private information about participants' cost of effort and prize allocation based on effort together with Aner Sela, Moldovanu finds that the allocation of the prize sum which maximizes expected total effort depends on participants' cost functions: if they are convex, several positive prizes may be optimal, otherwise allocating the entire prize sum to a single "first" prize is optimal. In another study with Sela on the architecture of contests, Moldovanu shows that the optimal split of contest participants among tournament-style sub-contests depends on the type of effort maximized and (again) on participants' effort cost functions: if they are linear, then expected total effort is maximized through a single static contest and expected highest effort is maximized through a two-stage contest with two sub-contests (assuming sufficient participants); but if they are convex, effort may be maximized through several sub-contests or the award of prizes to all finalists. If, however, contestants care about their relative positioning into status strata, Moldovanu, Sela and Xianwen Shi find that the optimal partition in status categories depends on the distribution of ability among contests, though the top status category always only contains a single winner; in particular, assuming a concave distribution, a partition with only two strata would already be optimal. Finally, together with Sela and Heidrun Hoppe, Moldovanu has explored the assortative matching of a finite number of agents in two-sided markets under incomplete information on the basis of costly signals.

== Selected publications ==
- Gershkov, A., Moldovanu, A. (2014). Dynamic Allocation and Pricing: A Mechanism Design Approach. Cambridge, MA: MIT Press.
