= David Yanagizawa-Drott =

David Yanagizawa-Drott (born 3 June 1978) is a Swedish economist who is currently a Professor of Development and Emerging Markets at the University of Zurich. His research focuses primarily on political economy and development economics. In 2025, Yanagizawa-Drott was awarded the prestigious Yrjö Jahnsson Award, given biennially by the European Economic Association to outstanding European economists under the age of 45.

== Education ==
Yanagizawa-Drott grew up in Sweden. He earned a Bachelor of Arts in Economics, a Bachelor of Arts in Japanese (both in 2004), and a Master of Science in Economics (2005), all from the University of Gothenburg. In 2010, he completed his PhD in Economics at the Institute for International Economic Studies (IIES), at Stockholm University.

== Career and research ==
Before joining the University of Zurich as a Professor of Development and Emerging Markets, Yanagizawa-Drott was an Associate Professor of Public Policy at the John F. Kennedy School of Government, at Harvard University. He is an affiliated professor at the UBS Center for Economics in Society, and is also affiliated with the Bureau for Research and Economic Analysis of Development (BREAD), the Centre for Economic Policy Research (CEPR), and the Abdul Latif Jameel Poverty Action Lab (J-PAL), where he co-chairs the initiative Partnership for AI Evidence. He is also a full member of the European Development Research Network (EUDN). He is the associate editor at the Quarterly Journal of Economics, and a member of the Editorial Board at the Review of Economic Studies.

== Recognition ==
Yanagizawa-Drott's work has been published in the most prestigious economic journals such The American Economic Review, The Quarterly Journal of Economics, the American Economic Journal: Applied Economics, Review of Economic Studies, and the Journal of European Economic Association. He was awarded the 2025 Yrjö Jahnsson Award for his work on political economy and the media.

== Selected publications ==
- with Leonardo Bursztyn, Aakaash Rao, Christopher Roth: "Opinions as Facts". ''The Review of Economic Studies''. 90 (4), July 2023, pp. 1832–1864. doi:10.1093/restud/rdac065.
- with Martina Björkman Nyqvist, Jakob Svensson: "Reducing Child Mortality in the Last Mile: Can Good Products Drive Out Bad? A Randomized Intervention in the Antimalarial Medicine Market in Uganda". ''Journal of the European Economic Association''. , Volume 20, Issue 3, June 2022, Pages 957–1000, doi:10.1093/jeea/jvab053
- with Leonardo Bursztyn, Alessandra L. González: "Misperceived Social Norms: Women Working Outside the Home in Saudi Arabia". ''American Economic Review''. 110 (10), October 2020, pp. 2997–3029. doi:10.1257/aer.20180975.
- with Martina Björkman Nyqvist, Andrea Guariso, Jakob Svensson: "Reducing Child Mortality in the Last Mile: Experimental Evidence on Community Health Promoters in Uganda". ''American Economic Journal: Applied Economics''. 11 (3), July 2019, pp. 155–192. doi:10.1257/app.20170201.
- with Filipe Campante: "Long-Range Growth: Economic Development in the Global Network of Air Links". ''The Quarterly Journal of Economics''. 133 (3), August 2018, pp. 1395–1458. doi:10.1093/qje/qjx050.
- with Tessa Bold, Kayuki C. Kaizzi, Jakob Svensson: "Lemon Technologies and Adoption: Measurement, Theory and Evidence from Agricultural Markets in Uganda". ''The Quarterly Journal of Economics''. 132 (3), August 2017, pp. 1055–1100. doi:10.1093/qje/qjx009.
- with Nancy Qian: "Government Distortion in Independently Owned Media: Evidence from U.S. News Coverage of Human Rights". ''Journal of the European Economic Association''. 15 (2), April 2017, pp. 463–499. doi:10.1093/jeea/jvx007.
- with Filipe Campante: "Does Religion Affect Economic Growth and Happiness? Evidence from Ramadan". ''The Quarterly Journal of Economics''. 130 (2), May 2015, pp. 615–658. doi:10.1093/qje/qjv002.
- with David Yanagizawa-Drott: "Propaganda and Conflict: Evidence from the Rwandan Genocide". ''The Quarterly Journal of Economics''. 129 (4), November 2014, pp. 1947–1994. doi:10.1093/qje/qju020.
- with Andreas Madestam, Daniel Shoag, Stan Veuger: "Do Political Protests Matter? Evidence from the Tea Party Movement". ''The Quarterly Journal of Economics''. 128 (4), November 2013, pp. 1633–1685. doi:10.1093/qje/qjt021.
