= Simon Gächter =

Austrian economist

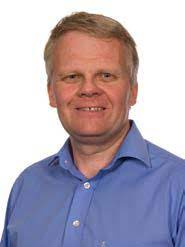
- Born: 8 March 1965 (age 61)

Academic background
- Education: University of Vienna
- Influences: Egbert Dierker

Academic work
- Discipline: Behavioral economics Experimental economics Labor economics
- Institutions: University of Nottingham
- Awards: Gossen Prize (2005)
- Website: Information at IDEAS / RePEc

Simon Gächter (born 8 March 1965 in Nenzing, Vorarlberg) is an Austrian economist. He currently is professor of the psychology of economic decision making at the University of Nottingham.

Gächter attended the University of Vienna, where he received his doctoral degree in economics in 1994. He earned his habilitation at the University of Zürich in 1999.

He is a fellow of the European Economic Association.
