= Moritz Schularick =

German economist

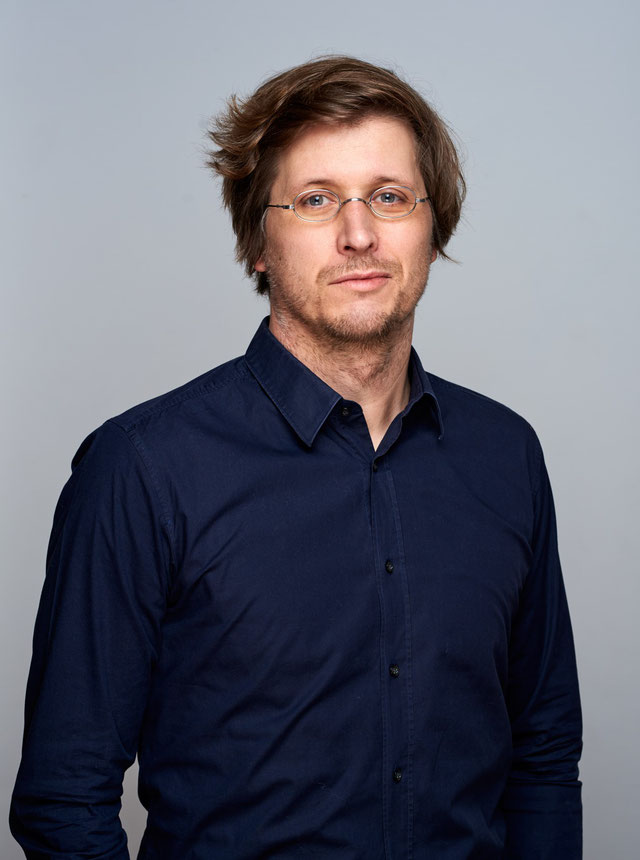
- Schularick in 2021
- Born: 1975 (age 50–51)
- Awards: Gossen Prize; Leibniz Prize
- Scientific career
- Fields: Macroeconomics; Banking and financial stability International Finance; Political Economy; Economic History
- Workplaces: Sciences Po Paris; University of Bonn
- Website: https://www.moritzschularick.com

Moritz Schularick [shoo-LAH-rick] (born 1975) is a German economist who has been serving as President of the Kiel Institute for the World Economy since 2023.

Schularick previously was Professor of Economics at Sciences Po Paris and the University of Bonn. He works in the fields of macrofinance, banking and financial stability, as well as international finance, political economy, and economic history.

== Early life and education ==
Schularick studied at the University of Paris-VII from 1996 and received the Maîtrise there in 1998. He then transferred to the London School of Economics on a German Academic Exchange Service (DAAD) scholarship, where he received an M.Sc. in 1999. He completed a third degree (M.A.) at the Humboldt University of Berlin in 2000.

== Career ==
From 1999, Schularick briefly worked at Deutsche Bank. In 2005, he received his Ph.D. at the Free University of Berlin, where he also taught as an assistant professor from 2007 to 2012. In 2008/09, he went to University of Cambridge as a visiting professor, and in 2011/2012 to the New York University Stern School of Business.

From 2012 to 2020, Schularick taught and conducted research at the University of Bonn as a W3 professor of macroeconomics. In the 2015/16 academic year, he held the Alfred Grosser chair at the Institut d'études politiques (Sciences Po) in Paris. In 2021, after a serving as Assistant Vice President in the research department of the New York Fed, he became a Professor of Economics at Sciences Po.

In 2018, Schularick was elected to the Berlin-Brandenburg Academy of Sciences and Humanities.

In 2025, Federal Minister for Economic Affairs and Energy Katherina Reiche appointed Schularick as one of four external advisors – alongside René Obermann, Nico Lange and Jürgen-Joachim von Sandrart – on Germany's defence industry.

== Research ==
Schularick's research focuses on monetary macroeconomics, international economics and economic history. His work on credit cycles, asset prices, and financial stability has formed the background for the so-called macroprudential policy aimed at curbing credit boom. His studies on the causes of financial crises and the transformation of the financial system are among the most internationally cited macroeconomic papers of the last decade.

In 2012, Schularick received a Schumpeter Fellowship from the Volkswagen Foundation to study the financial side of globalization, what he calls financialization.

Schularick's work on China-America economic relations, the causes of populism, and returns on various asset classes has also attracted considerable interest among experts and in the media. Together with Niall Ferguson, he is credited with having coined the term Chimerica, a neologism to describe the integrated nature of the Sino-American economic relationship.

Named articles by Schularick have appeared in The New York Times, the Financial Times, and the Süddeutsche Zeitung, among others.

== Other activities ==
- Hertie School, Member of the Board of Trustees (since 2025)
- Centre for Prospective Studies and International Information (CEPII), Member of the Scientific Committee
- Wirtschaftsdienst, Member of the Scientific Advisory Board
- State Ministry for Economics, Transport, Labour, Technology and Tourism of Schleswig-Holstein, Member of the Advisory Board on Small and Medium-Sized Businesses

== Awards ==
- 2018: Gossen Prize of the Verein für Socialpolitik
- 2022: Leibniz Prize

== Works ==
- Òscar Jordà, Martin Kornejew, Moritz Schularick, Alan Taylor: Zombies at Large: Corporate Debt Overhang and the Macroeconomy. In: Review of Financial Studies, forthcoming.
- Moritz Schularick: Der entzauberte Staat. Was Deutschland aus der Pandemie lernen muss. C. H. Beck, München 2021, ISBN 978-3-406-77782-0.
- Lucas ter Steege, Moritz Schularick, Felix Ward: Leaning Against the Wind and Crisis Risk. In: American Economic Review: Insights, 2021.
- Òscar Jordà, Björn Richter, Moritz Schularick, Alan Taylor: Bank Capital Redux: Solvency, Liquidity, and Crisis. In: Review of Economic Studies, 2021, 88: 260–286.
- Moritz Kuhn, Moritz Schularick, Ulrike Isabel Steins: Income and Wealth Inequality in America, 1949–2016. In: Journal of Political Economy, 2020, doi:10.1086/708815.
- Alina Bartscher, Moritz Kuhn, Moritz Schularick: The College Wealth Divide: Education and Inequality in America, 1956–2016. In: Federal Reserve Bank of St. Louis Review 102(1), 2020, S. 19–49, doi:10.20955/r.102.19-49.
- Katharina Knoll, Moritz Schularick and Thomas Steger: No Price Like Home, American Economic Review, 2017, 107: 331–353.
- Manuel Funke, Moritz Schularick, Christoph Trebesch: Going to Extremes: Politics after Financial Crises, European Economic Review, 2016, 88: 227–260.
- Òscar Jordà, Moritz Schularick, Alan Taylor: The Great Mortgaging: Housing Finance, Crises, and Business Cycles, Economic Policy, 2016, 85: 107–152
- Òscar Jordà, Moritz Schularick, Alan Taylor: Betting the House, Journal of International Economics, 2015, 96: 2–18.
- Òscar Jordà, Moritz Schularick, Alan Taylor: Leveraged Bubbles, Journal of Monetary Economics, 2015, 76: 1–20.
- Moritz Schularick, Alan Taylor: Credit Booms Gone Bust: Monetary Policy, Leverage Cycles, and Financial Crises, American Economic Review, 2012, 102: 1029–1061.
- Niall Ferguson, Moritz Schularick: The End of Chimerica, International Finance, 2011, 14: 1–26.
- Niall Ferguson, Moritz Schularick: Chimerica and global asset markets. (PDF) 2006, accessed July 11, 2014.

== Press ==
- Svea Junge: Wirtschaftshistoriker mit Weitblick. In: FAZ. April 28, 2022.
- Martin Greive: Corona-Nachlese: Wenn der Staat nur bedingt einsatzbereit ist. In: Handelsblatt. October 17, 2021.
- Johannes Pennekamp: Willkommen im Dschungel. In: FAZ. July 18, 2021.
- Michael S. Derby: NY Fed Paper: Easy Monetary Policy Does Little to Cut Racial Income Inequality. In: The Wall Street Journal. January 29, 2021.
- Jung, Alexander; Wille, Robin (December 27, 2019). "Wer mietet, verliert". Spiegel.
- Johannes Pennekamp: Am Häusermarkt braut sich etwas zusammen. In: FAZ. June 18, 2014.
