= Christopher Roth (economist) =

Behavioral economist at the University of Cologne

Academic background
- Education: University of Oxford (MPhil, DPhil)

Academic work
- Discipline: Behavioral economics, political economy, macroeconomics
- Institutions: University of Cologne
- Awards: Reinhard Selten Prize (2018); Edgeworth Prize (2019); Hans Kelsen Prize (2025)
- Website: sites.google.com/site/chrisrotheconomics/

Christopher Roth is a behavioral economist and professor of economics and management at the University of Cologne. He studies how people form beliefs and how narratives, attention, and memory shape economic and political decisions. Since 2024, he has been a co-editor of the Journal of the European Economic Association.

== Education and career ==
Roth received an MPhil in economics from Keble College, Oxford, in 2014 and completed his DPhil there in 2018. His thesis, Essays on Beliefs and Economic Behaviour, won Oxford's 2019 Edgeworth Prize.

After a postdoctoral fellowship at the Institute on Behavior and Inequality in Bonn, Roth was an assistant professor at Warwick from 2019 to 2021. He joined the University of Cologne as a professor in July 2021. He has also been affiliated with the Centre for Economic Policy Research and the Max Planck Institute for Behavioral Economics.

== Research ==
Much of Roth's work concerns narratives and belief formation. A 2024 study with Thomas Graeber and Florian Zimmermann found that stories had more persistent effects on beliefs than statistics, largely because people recalled them more easily. Another study compared how more than 10,000 US households and academic economists explained inflation. Household accounts were generally less detailed and more likely to focus on supply-side or political explanations; the narratives people encountered also changed their expectations.

In 2024, Roth received a €1.5 million European Research Council Starting Grant for Viral Narratives, a project on how economic narratives arise, spread, and influence behavior.

His other research has examined experimenter-demand effects, beliefs about macroeconomic shocks, the design of information-provision experiments, and workers' knowledge of wages at other employers.

== Recognition ==
Roth and Johannes Wohlfart received the Verein für Socialpolitik's Reinhard Selten Prize in 2018. In WirtschaftsWoche's 2023 ranking of economists under 40 in Germany, Austria, and Switzerland, Roth placed fifth overall and first among those based at a German institution. In June 2026, IDEAS/RePEc ranked him 30th worldwide for research published during the preceding ten years. The University of Cologne awarded him its senior Hans Kelsen Prize for law and economics in 2025.
