= Klaus M. Schmidt =

German economist (born 1961)

Klaus M. Schmidt (born 16 June 1961) is a German economist who currently works as Professor of Economics at LMU Munich. His research focuses on behavioural economics, game theory and contract theory. In 2001, Schmidt was awarded the Gossen Prize in recognition for his contributions to economic research on game theory, contract theory, and the economics of fairness. He is a member of the council for the Lindau Nobel Laureate Meetings.

== Biography ==
Klaus Schmidt has studied at the University of Hamburg and at the University of Bonn. He completed his doctoral program at the University of Bonn in 1991. Since his habilitation in 1995, he has been working as a professor of economics at LMU Munich. He has held visiting appointments at Harvard University, University of California, Berkeley, MIT, Stanford University and Yale University.

== Research ==
The research interests of Klaus Schmidt include contract theory, game theory, behavioural economics, experimental economics, industrial organization, competition policy, privatization, auction theory, venture capital, and political economy. In his research, he has frequently collaborated with Ernst Fehr. According to IDEAS/RePEc, Schmidt belongs to the top 1% of economists as ranked by research output.

== Selected publications ==
- Fehr, E., Schmidt, K.M. (1999). A theory of fairness, competition, and cooperation. Quarterly Journal of Economics, 114(3), pp. 817–868.
- Schmidt, K.M. (1997). Managerial incentives and product market competition. Review of Economic Studies, 64(2), pp. 191–213.
- Fehr, E., Schmidt, K.M. (2006). The economics of fairness, reciprocity and altruism - Experimental evidence and new theories. In: Kolm, S.-C., Mercier Ythier, J. (eds.). Handbook of the Economics of Giving, Altruism, and Reciprocity, pp. 615–691.
- Schmidt, K.M. (2003). Convertible securities and venture capital finance. Journal of Finance, 58(3), pp. 1139–1166.
- Fehr, E., Klein, A., Schmidt, K.M. (2007). Fairness and contract design. Econometrica, 75(1), pp. 121–154.
- Schmidt, K.M. (1996). The costs and benefits of privatization: an incomplete contracts approach. Journal of Law, Economics, and Organization, 12(1), pp. 1–24.
- Nöldeke, G., Schmidt, K.M. (1995). Option contracts and renegotiation: A solution to the hold-up problem. RAND Journal of Economics, 26(2), pp. 164–179.

== Books ==
- Schmidt, Klaus M. (1994), Contracts, Competition, and the Theory of Reputation, Habilitation

thesis, submitted to the Faculty of Law and Economics at the University of Bonn, October 1994

- Schmidt, Klaus M. (1991), Commitment in Games with Asymmetric Information, Ph.D.

dissertation, submitted to the Faculty of Law and Economics at the University of Bonn, July 1991.
