= Hilma Gabriella Jahnsson =

Finnish lawyer

Hilma Gabriella Jahnsson (3 February 1882 in Hägg, Turku – 11 June 1975) was a Finnish lawyer. She was best known for her husband, professor Yrjö Jahnsson, as the founder of the foundation of her spouse. As Secretary of the Parliamentary Committee on Labor Affairs, she served in 1917–1930 and was also a party candidate for the Social Democratic Party in the 1933 parliamentary elections. She was the third female jurist in Finland.
