= Michèle Tertilt =

German economist

- Born: 1972; Münster
- Alma mater: University of Minnesota; Bielefeld University
- Occupation: Economist; university teacher
- Awards: Gossen Prize (2013); Yrjö Jahnsson Award (2017); Leibniz Prize (2019); Fellow of the Econometric Society (2017, 2017)
- Website: tertilt.vwl.uni-mannheim.de
- Academic career
- Institutions: Stanford University (2003–2011); University of Mannheim (2010–)
- Doctoral advisor: Larry E. Jones

Michèle Tertilt (born 1972 in Münster) is a German professor of economics at the University of Mannheim. Before, Tertilt was an assistant professor at Stanford University. She also spent a year at the University of Pennsylvania and one year as a research fellow at the Hoover Institution.

In 2017 she received the Yrjö Jahnsson Award – a biennial award by the European Economic Association and the Yrjö Jahnsson Foundation to a European economist no older than 45 years, who has made a contribution in theoretical and applied research that is significant to economics in Europe. In September 2013 she was awarded the Gossen Prize – an annual award by the Verein für Socialpolitik which recognizes the best published economist under 45 working in the German-speaking area. Tertilt is the first woman to win this prestigious German prize in economics. In 2019, she was awarded the Gottfried Wilhelm Leibniz Prize by the Deutsche Forschungsgemeinschaft. Her main focus is around development and intra-family interactions. She has also worked on consumer credit and bankruptcies.

== Biography and career ==
Tertilt studied economics at Bielefeld University and obtained her PhD from the University of Minnesota. After pursuing her PhD, Tertilt was an assistant professor at Stanford University for seven years. During that time she also spent a year at the University of Pennsylvania and one year as a research fellow at the Hoover Institution. Since 2010 she has been a full professor at the University of Mannheim. She was a director of the Review of Economic Studies from 2021 until 2024 and has been an associate editor of the Journal of Development Economics since 2010.

== Research ==
Tertilt's research concentrates on macroeconomics with a special focus on development and intra-family interactions. She has also worked on consumer credit and bankruptcies. Her work has been published in top journals, including the American Economic Review, Econometrica, the Journal of Political Economy, the Quarterly Journal of Economics, and the Review of Economic Studies. Her research has been financed by a European Research Council Starting Grant (2013–2018), through a National Science Foundation (NSF) CAREER grant (2008–2011), a Sloan Research Fellowship (2009–2011) and an NSF grant (2005–2008).

Tertilt made important contributions to family economics and household finance. Her work has uncovered the salient implications of gender roles for macroeconomics, development, and fertility. Her research has also contributed to the understanding of the development of consumer credit markets and default rates. With Matthias Doepke, she wrote the chapter "Families in Macroeconomics" for the "Handbook of Macroeconomics,". This chapter sheds light on "the importance of gender inequality and family dynamics for macro and points to many fruitful avenues for future research", she said in an interview with the Human Capital and Economic Opportunity Global Working Group (HCEO).

== Academic honours and awards ==
- Birgit Grodal Award of the European Economic Association (2024)
- Gottfried Wilhelm Leibniz Prize of the Deutsche Forschungsgemeinschaft (2019)
- Fellow of the Econometric Society (2017)
- Yrjö Jahnsson Award, Yrjö Jahnsson Foundation and the European Economic Association (2017)
- Bavarian Academy of Sciences, Elected Member, since 2015
- Gossen Prize, Verein für Socialpolitik, 2013
- Fellow of the European Economic Association, since 2013
- Alfred P. Sloan Research Fellow, 2009–2011
- Hoover National Fellow, 2007–2008
- Best Dissertation Award, University of Minnesota, May 2004
- Doctoral fellowship, graduate school, University of Minnesota, 2001–2002
- Fellowship in llApplied llEconomics, Social Science Research Council, 1999–2000
- Doctoral llFellowship, German National Merit Foundation, 1998–1999
- Graduate llSchool llBlock llGrant, University of Minnesota, 1997–1998
- Fellowship, German National Merit Foundation, 1996–1997
- Scholarship, German Academic Exchange Service, 1995–1996

== Selected publications ==
- Status Externalities in Education and Low Birth Rates in Korea, with S. Kim and M. Yum, American Economic Review, June 2024.
- "The Economics of Women's Rights," with M. Doepke, A. Hannusch and L. Montenbruck, Journal of the European Economic Association Preprint in October 2022
- "From Mancession to Shecession: Women's Employment in Regular and Pandemic Recessions," with T. Alon, S. Coskun and M. Doepke and D. Koll, NBER Macroeconomics Annual 2021 Vol. 36, May 2022.
- "An Equilibrium Model of the African HIV/AIDS Epidemic," with J. Greenwood, P. Kircher and C. Santos, Econometrica Vol. 87, No. 4, 1081–1113, July 2019.
- "The Role of Marriage in Fighting HIV: A Quantitative Illustration for Malawi," with J. Greenwood, P. Kircher and C. Santos, American Economic Review Papers and Proceedings, 2017.
- "The Democratization of Credit and the Rise in Consumer Bankruptcies," with I. Livshits and J. MacGee, Review of Economic Studies, Vol. 83 (4), 1673–1710, 2016.
- "Accounting for the Rise in Consumer Bankruptcies," with I. Livshits and J. MacGee, American Economic Journal Macro, Vol. 2, No. 2, 165–193, April 2010.
- "Women's Liberation: What's in it for Men?," with M. Doepke, Quarterly Journal of Economics, Vol. 124, No. 4, 1541–1591, November 2009.
- "Efficiency with Endogenous Population Growth," with M. Golosov and L. Jones, Econometrica, Vol. 75 (4), 1039–1071, July 2007.
- "Consumer Bankruptcy – A Fresh Start," with I. Livshits and J. MacGee, American Economic Review, Vol. 97 (1), 402–418, March 2007.
- "Polygyny, Fertility, and Savings," Journal of Political Economy, Vol.113 (6), 1341–1371, December 2005.
