= Luigi Pistaferri =

Italian-American economist

- Born: 1968; Naples, Italy
- Citizenship: Italy; United States

Academic background
- Education: University College London (PhD); Istituto Universitario Navale (Bachelor's degree); Bocconi University (Master's degree)

Academic work
- Discipline: Financial economics
- Institutions: Stanford University

Luigi Pistaferri (born 1968) is an Italian-American economist and the Ray Lyman Wilbur Professor of Economics at Stanford University. He is known for his research in labor and macroeconomics, focusing on family consumption, labor supply, welfare reform, and inequality. He is also a research fellow at the National Bureau of Economic Research (NBER), the Centre for Economic Policy Research (CEPR), the Institute for the Study of Labor (IZA), and a faculty affiliate at the Stanford Center on Longevity. He is the co-director or GRID (Global Repository of Income Dynamics). During the period 2012-17 he served as a co-editor of the American Economic Review; he is currently one of the co-editors of the Journal of Political Economy. He is the author (with frequent collaborator Tullio Jappelli) of the book The Economics of Consumption: Theory and Evidence.

== Biography ==
Pistaferri was born in Naples, Italy, in 1968. He earned his undergraduate degree in International Trade and Foreign Exchange Markets from the Istituto Universitario Navale (IUN, now Parthenope University) in 1993. He then completed a Master's in Economics at Bocconi University in Milan in 1995. Pistaferri went on to earn his Ph.D. in economics from University College London in 1999 and later obtained a Doctorate in Economic Sciences from IUN in 2001.

=== Academic career ===
Pistaferri joined Stanford University in 1999 as an assistant professor in the Department of Economics. He was promoted to associate professor in 2006 and to full professor in 2011. Since 2013, he has held the position of Ralph Landau Senior Fellow at the Stanford Institute for Economic Policy Research (SIEPR). Pistaferri has also held several visiting academic positions, including a Bajola Parisani Visiting Chair in Economics and Institutions at the Einaudi Institute for Economics and Finance in Rome during 2011-2012, a "Franco Modigliani" Visiting Professorship at the University of Naples "Federico II" in 2018-19, and a University of Chicago Griffin Economics Incubator Distinguished Visitor position in 2024-25.

Before joining Stanford, Pistaferri worked as a research economist at the Institute for Fiscal Studies in London from 1998 to 1999.

Pistaferri is one of the co-authors of a paper that found a significant relationship between income inequality and consumption inequality over the past two decades. His work often incorporates large-scale datasets and quantitative methods to analyze families' and individuals' behavior in response to economic policy changes.

== Awards ==
- Elected Fellow of the Society of Labor Economists (2024)
- Elected Fellow of the Econometric Society (2016)
- Excellence in Refereeing Award from American Economic Review (2012)
- Annual Economics Outstanding Teaching Prize from Stanford University (2005)
- Glenn Campbell and Rita Ricardo-Campbell National Fellow at Hoover Institution (2003)
- Co-winner of the Best Italian Young Economist Prize, awarded by Il Sole-24 Ore (1999)
- Review of Economic Studies Tour participant (1999)

== Selected publications ==
- Blundell, Richard; Pistaferri, Luigi; Preston, Ian (2008-11-01). "Consumption Inequality and Partial Insurance". American Economic Review. 98 (5): 1887–1921. doi:10.1257/aer.98.5.1887. hdl:10419/71465. ISSN 0002-8282.
- Chetty, R.; Friedman, J. N.; Olsen, T.; Pistaferri, L. (2011-05-01). "Adjustment Costs, Firm Responses, and Micro vs. Macro Labor Supply Elasticities: Evidence from Danish Tax Records". The Quarterly Journal of Economics. 126 (2): 749–804. doi:10.1093/qje/qjr013. ISSN 0033-5533. PMC 3152831.
- Meghir, Costas; Pistaferri, Luigi (2004). "Income Variance Dynamics and Heterogeneity". Econometrica. 72 (1): 1–32. doi:10.1111/j.1468-0262.2004.00476.x. hdl:10.1111/j.1468-0262.2004.00476.x. ISSN 0012-9682.
- Jappelli, Tullio; Pistaferri, Luigi (2010-09-04). "The Consumption Response to Income Changes". Annual Review of Economics. 2 (1): 479–506. doi:10.1146/annurev.economics.050708.142933. ISSN 1941-1383.
- Blundell, Richard; Pistaferri, Luigi; Saporta-Eksten, Itay (2016-02-01). "Consumption Inequality and Family Labor Supply". American Economic Review. 106 (2): 387–435. doi:10.1257/aer.20121549. hdl:10419/154089. ISSN 0002-8282.
- Fagereng, Andreas; Guiso, Luigi; Malacrino, Davide; Pistaferri, Luigi (2020). "Heterogeneity and Persistence in Returns to Wealth". Econometrica. 88 (1): 115–170. doi:10.3982/ecta14835. hdl:11250/2753192. ISSN 0012-9682.
- Low, Hamish; Meghir, Costas; Pistaferri, Luigi (2010-09-01). "Wage Risk and Employment Risk over the Life Cycle". American Economic Review. 100 (4): 1432–1467. doi:10.1257/aer.100.4.1432. hdl:10419/47512. ISSN 0002-8282.
- Guiso, Luigi; Pistaferri, Luigi; Schivardi, Fabiano (2005). "Insurance within the Firm". Journal of Political Economy. 113 (5): 1054–1087. doi:10.1086/432136. hdl:11388/263758. ISSN 0022-3808.
- Jappelli, Tullio; Pistaferri, Luigi (2014-10-01). "Fiscal Policy and MPC Heterogeneity". American Economic Journal: Macroeconomics. 6 (4): 107–136. doi:10.1257/mac.6.4.107. ISSN 1945-7707.
- Attanasio, Orazio P.; Pistaferri, Luigi (2016-05-01). "Consumption Inequality". Journal of Economic Perspectives. 30 (2): 3–28. doi:10.1257/jep.30.2.3. ISSN 0895-3309.
- Meghir, Costas; Pistaferri, Luigi (2011), "Earnings, Consumption and Life Cycle Choices", Handbook of Labor Economics, Elsevier, pp. 773–854, ISBN 978-0-444-53452-1
- Low, Hamish; Pistaferri, Luigi (2015-10-01). "Disability Insurance and the Dynamics of the Incentive Insurance Trade-Off". American Economic Review. 105 (10): 2986–3029. doi:10.1257/aer.20110108. ISSN 0002-8282.
- Pistaferri, Luigi (2003). "Anticipated and Unanticipated Wage Changes, Wage Risk, and Intertemporal Labor Supply". Journal of Labor Economics. 21 (3): 729–754. doi:10.1086/374965. ISSN 0734-306X.
- De Giorgi, Giacomo; Frederiksen, Anders; Pistaferri, Luigi (2016). Consumption Network Effects (Report). Cambridge, MA: National Bureau of Economic Research.
- Pistaferri, Luigi (2001). "Superior Information, Income Shocks, and the Permanent Income Hypothesis". Review of Economics and Statistics. 83 (3): 465–476. doi:10.1162/00346530152480117. ISSN 0034-6535.

== See also ==
- List of fellows of the Econometric Society
