= Bonn Graduate School of Economics =

Bonn Graduate School of Economics (BGSE)
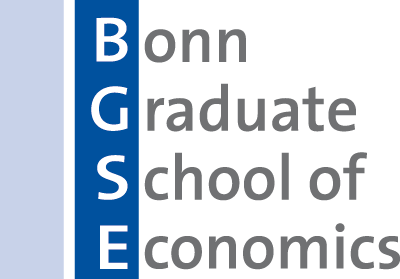
- Type: University Research Institute
- Established: 1998
- Director: Benny Moldovanu
- Location: Bonn, Nordrhein-Westfalen, Germany
- Website: www.bgse.uni-bonn.de

The Bonn Graduate School of Economics, commonly referred to as BGSE, is the graduate school of the Department of Economics within the Faculty of Law and Economics of the University of Bonn. The BGSE is one of the leading research institutions in the field of economics in Germany. The school offers a Doctoral Program (PhD) with integrated MSc Economic Research degree (2 years + 3 years). Students who want to pursue a doctoral degree can specialize in economic research within the master program and then continue with the dissertation phase. The BGSE is a founding member of the European Doctoral Program (EDP) in Quantitative Economics. The EDP opens up the way for doctoral students of the BGSE to spend time at one of the EDP-Partners in Barcelona, Florence, Louvain-la-Neuve, Paris, and Tel Aviv, to participate at the annual doctoral student conference, the EDP-jamboree, and to benefit from the EDP's long-established and firm tradition to integrate graduate students into the international academic community.

The BGSE pursues research activities in the following five research areas:

- microeconomic theory
- management and applied microeconomics
- financial economics
- macroeconomics and public economics
- econometrics and statistics

== Exchange programs ==
The BGSE has collaborations with the following international partners:

- UC Berkeley
- Yale University

== Faculty ==
The faculty comprises almost 40 professors and about 50 assistants. Many of them have received major awards, such as:

- Nobel Prize for Reinhard Selten (†) (1994)
- Leibniz Prize for Werner Hildenbrand (1988) and Armin Falk (2009)
- Max Planck Research Award for Werner Hildenbrand (1994) and Benny Moldovanu (2001)
- Gossen Prize for Jürgen von Hagen (1997), Benny Moldovanu (2004), and Armin Falk (2008)
- European Research Council grants for Armin Falk (2), Benny Moldovanu, Christian Bayer (2), Stephan Lauermann

Director/Speaker of the BGSE is Benny Moldovanu.

== Placements ==
BGSE alumni have obtained positions at universities in the U.S. (e.g., Harvard, Berkeley, Penn, UCLA, Michigan, Minnesota), in Europe (e.g., University College London, Pompeu Fabra, Tilburg, Carlos III, Stockholm, Zurich) and in Germany (e.g., Mannheim, Munich, Berlin, Cologne). In addition, many now work in the non-academic sector (e.g., European Central Bank, German Central Bank, Bank of England, U.S. Federal Reserve Board, McKinsey, Boston Consulting).
