= Petra Moser =

Economist and economic historian

- Education: University of California, Berkeley (PhD); University of Tubingen (BA)
- Awards: National Science Foundation CAREER Award; Fulbright Scholarship
- Scientific career
- Fields: Economic History
- Workplaces: New York University Stern School of Business
- Thesis: Determinants of Innovation: Evidence from 19th-Century World Fairs (2001)
- Doctoral students: Alessandra Voena

Petra Moser is an economist and economic historian serving as a Professor of Economics at the New York University Stern School of Business. Her work examines the origins of creativity and innovation. She is the recipient of a National Science Foundation CAREER Award.

== Biography ==
Moser was born in Germany, and completed her undergraduate studies at the University of Tübingen. She subsequently studied at the University of Missouri, Columbia on a Fulbright Scholarship. In 1996, she received her MA in International Relations from Yale University, and in 2002 graduated from the University of California, Berkeley with a PhD in Economics. At Berkeley, she completed her dissertation research on the effects of patent laws on downstream innovation, leveraging exhibitions data from early world's fairs. For her work, she received the Alexander Gerschenkron Prize, awarded by the Economic History Association to the best dissertation in economic history on an area outside the United States or Canada.

Moser began her academic career at the MIT Sloan School of Management, where she was an Assistant Professor of Strategy until 2006. From 2005 to 2006, she was a National Fellow at the Hoover Institution. She subsequently joined Stanford University as an Assistant Professor of Economics. In 2015, she moved to the New York University Stern School of Business, where she currently serves as Professor of Economics.

In addition to her academic appointment, Moser is affiliated with the National Bureau of Economic Research and Center for Economic and Policy Research. She is a member of the editorial board of Explorations in Economic History. From 2018-2021 she was on the board of the American Economic Association Committee on the Status of Women in the Economics Profession. She was a fellow at Abdul Latif Jameel Poverty Action Lab, where she was mentored by Esther Duflo, Abhijit Banerjee and Joshua Angrist.

Moser is fluent in German and English, with additional proficiency in Spanish, French, Italian, and Latin.

== Research ==
Moser's research uses tools from economic history and applied econometrics to study the origins of creativity and innovation. According to Research Papers in Economics, as of November 2023 she is among the top 400 female economists in the world.

=== World's fairs ===
Moser's dissertation research examined the effects of patent laws on downstream innovation using data from the 1851 Great Exhibition in London and the 1876 Centennial Exposition in Philadelphia. Moser shows that countries with stronger patent laws featured inventions across a wider diversity of industries than their counterparts with weaker enforcement. In particular, Moser shows that small European countries such as Switzerland with limited patent enforcement focused on scientific instruments, whose production process was easier to guard as trade secrets.

=== Copyright and opera ===
In work with Michela Giorcelli in the Journal of Political Economy, Moser leverages the staggered introduction of copyright laws in Italian states over the course of the Napoleonic invasion of Italy to study the effects of intellectual property enforcement on opera. She finds that the introduction of copyright laws increased the number of operas per year by 121%. The research has been cited as evidence for the importance of strong intellectual property enforcement in fostering creativity.

=== Immigration and science ===
In work with Alessandra Voena and Fabian Waldinger published in the American Economic Review, Moser shows that United States patenting in subfields of chemistry covered by German-Jewish emigrants during World War II increased by 31% relative to the fields of other German scientists.

Leveraging a similar methodological approach, Moser shows with Shmuel San that reductions in immigration from Eastern and Southern Europe in response to the Emergency Quota Act of 1921 and Immigration Act of 1924 decreased patenting by U.S. scientists in the fields covered by those immigrants by almost 60%.
