= Neale Mahoney =

Applied microeconomist

- Born: 1982 (age 43–44)

Academic background
- Education: Brown University; Stanford University
- Doctoral advisors: Jonathan Levin, Liran Einav, Caroline Hoxby

Academic work
- Discipline: Public finance, industrial organization, health economics
- Institutions: Stanford University
- Awards: ASHEcon Medal; Sloan Research Fellowship; Eric Zitzewitz Award

Neale Mahoney (born 1982) is a professor of economics at Stanford University, California, United States, and the inaugural George P. Shultz Fellow at the Stanford Institute for Economic Policy Research. He is also a Research Associate at the National Bureau of Economic Research. In 2022-2023, Mahoney served in the Biden Administration's National Economic Council as a Special Policy Advisor for Economic Policy.

== Education ==
Mahoney earned a Bachelor of Science from Brown University in applied mathematics-economics in 2005, where he received the Samuel C. Lamport Prize for the best undergraduate thesis in economics. He completed a Master of Arts and Ph.D. in economics at Stanford University in 2011, where he was a George P. Shultz Scholar and Ric Weiland Fellow.

In college, Mahoney played for the Brown Men's Ultimate team, winning a National Championship in 2005. He coached the Stanford Men's Ultimate team to a quarter-final appearance in the 2011 National Championships.

== Career ==
Mahoney was an Robert Wood Johnson Foundation Scholar in Health Policy Research at Harvard in 2011-2012 and taught at the University of Chicago Booth School of Business from 2013 to 2020, where he was the David G. Booth Faculty Fellow. He joined Stanford in 2020 as professor of economics.

=== Research ===
Mahoney is an applied microeconomist whose research focuses on topics in health economics and consumer finance. His research on credit card markets has shown the consumer benefits of regulating hidden fees and the limited pass-through of interest rate cuts to low credit score borrowers. In research on credit card repayments, he found that consumers followed a balance-matching heuristic, rather than allocating their payments to the card with highest interest rate.

Mahoney's research on medical debt has received widespread media attention, and was featured in a segment on the CBS Evening News. His work on hospitals suing patients over unpaid medical bills has also been broadly covered. A 2005 paper co-authored by Elizabeth Warren entitled "Illness And Injury As Contributors To Bankruptcy" helped to spark Mahoney's interest in the economics of medical bankruptcy.

In 2016, Mahoney was named a Sloan Research Fellow, given to early-career scientists and scholars of outstanding promise. In 2021, Mahoney received the ASHEcon Medal for researchers aged 40 and under who have made significant contributions to the field of health economics.
