= Ifo Business Climate Index =

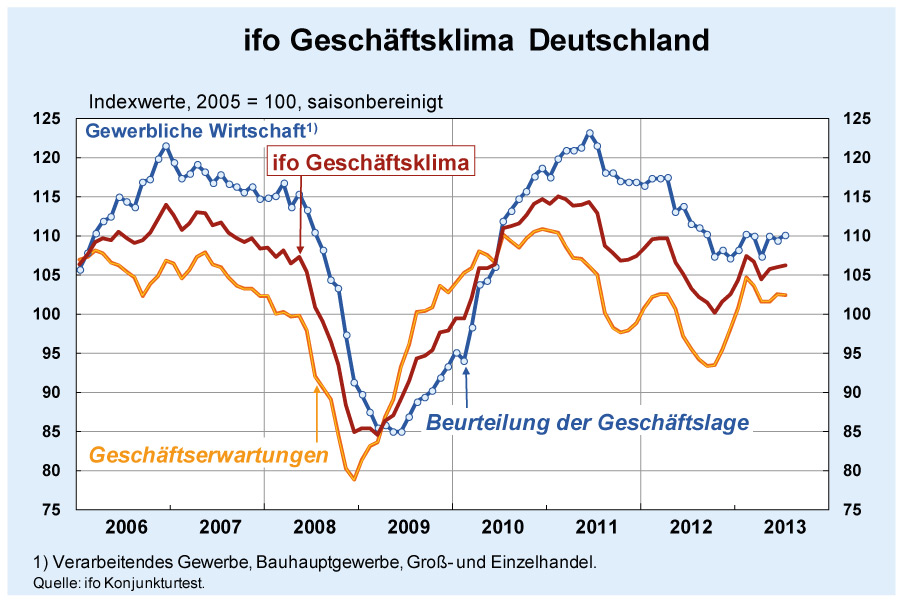

The Ifo Business Climate Index is a closely followed leading indicator for economic activity in Germany prepared by the Ifo Institute for Economic Research in Munich, Germany.

== Elements ==
The responses to the survey questionnaire, described below, are evaluated and seasonally adjusted. An index value of 100 corresponds to the survey data as of 1 January 2005. Since January 1991, more than 200 data sets have been published.

Three data series are compiled from the raw survey data:

- business climate
- current business situation
- business outlook

These three components are published as the percentage change over the previous month and as the absolute value with regard to the index reference data, 1 January 2005 = 100. Given the growing importance of the services sector in Germany, Ifo changed the business climate indicator in 2018 to rebase the index and include responses from the services sector in its calculations.

Often the results are depicted in the form of a "business-cycle clock".

== Procedure ==
Every month, approximately 9,000 survey participants from firms in manufacturing, construction, wholesaling and retailing are requested to assess their current business situation as well as their business outlook for the coming six months. The Ifo Business Climate has been released monthly by the Ifo Institute since 1972.

=== Questionnaire ===
The firms are queried as to

- their current business situation, with the following choices
  - good
  - satisfactory
  - poor
- their six-month business outlook, with these three choices
  - more favorable
  - unchanged
  - less favorable

=== Evaluation method ===
The balance value of the current business situation is the difference in percentage shares of the responses "good" and "poor"; the balance value of the expectations is the difference in percentage shares of the responses "more favorable" and "less favorable". The business climate is a geometric mean of the balances of the business situation and the business expectations. To calculate the business climate index value, the transformed balances are normalized to the average of the year 2015.

=== Interpretation ===
As an indicator of economic activity, the Business Climate Index is meant to supplement data from the official statistics, over which it has the advantage of being more frequently compiled and more rapidly accessible (GDP, for example, is only released quarterly and published with a delay of ca. two quarters, with the likelihood of subsequent revisions).

The particular importance of the Ifo Business Climate Index is forecasting turning points in economic growth. A cyclical turning point is reliably indicated following the "three-times rule", that is movement in a particular direction three months in succession.

== Highest and lowest values ==
The Index reached its lowest value in united Germany in March 2020 with 74.2 points. In December 2008, the business expectations component hit an all-time low of 76.9 points. The lowest level of the second component of the Index, business situation, was at its lowest point in May 2009 with 82.5 points.

The all-time high of the Ifo Index was reached in December 2010 with 109.5 index points, surpassing the previous record high of 108.8 points in December 2006. In March 2006, the surveyed firms gave the best-ever appraisals of the business outlook, with an index value of 105.3.
