= Matching theory =

Matching theory can refer to:

- Search-and-matching theory - an economic theory describing how people match to jobs when the search process is costly.
- Stable matching theory - an economic theory studying desirable normative properties of matchings and developing rules that attain such matchings.
- Matching (graph theory) - a mathematical theory studying the properties and computation of matchings in networks (graphs).
