= Financial stability =

Ability to manage financial crisis

Financial stability is the absence of system-wide episodes in which a financial crisis occurs and is characterised as an economy with low volatility. It also involves financial systems' stress-resilience being able to cope with both good and bad times. Financial stability is the aim of most governments and central banks. The aim is not to prevent crises or stop bad financial decisions. It is there to hold the economy together and keep the system running smoothly while such events are happening.

The foundation of financial stability is the creation of a system that is able to absorb all of the positive and negative events that happen to the economy at any given time. It has nothing to do with preventing individuals or businesses from failing, losing money, or succeeding. It is merely assisting in the creation of conditions for the system's continued efficient operation in the face of such occurrences.

The economy is one that is constantly changing and expanding, and it is full of businesses that start, grow, and fail: routine activities of the business cycle. Financial markets and financial institutions are considered stable when they are able to provide households, communities, and businesses with the resources, services, and products they require to invest, grow, and participate in a well-functioning economy. Financial institutions include banks, savings and loans, and other financial product and service providers. A financial system that meets the needs of typical families and businesses to borrow money to buy a house or car, save for retirement, or pay for college is considered to have financial stability. In a similar vein, businesses must take out loans in order to expand, construct factories, recruit new workers, and make payroll.

The ability to efficiently allot resources, assess and manage financial risks, maintain employment levels close to the natural rate of the economy, and eliminate relative price movements of real or financial assets that will affect monetary stability or employment levels are all features of a financially stable system. Financial imbalances that arise naturally or as a result of significant adverse and unforeseen events are dissipated when a financial system is in a range of stability. When the system is stable, it will primarily absorb shocks through self-corrective mechanisms, preventing adverse events from disrupting the real economy or other financial systems. Because the majority of real-world transactions take place through the financial system, financial stability is absolutely necessary for economic expansion.

In the recent years climate related risk management became increasingly significant for central banks due to more available data and research.

== Empirical measures ==
=== Firm-level stability measures ===
The 1968 Altman's z‐score is extensively used in empirical research as a measure of firm-level stability for its high correlation with the probability of default. This measure contrasts buffers (capitalization and returns) with risk (volatility of returns) and has done well at predicting bankruptcies within two years. Despite development of alternative models to predict financial stability, Altman's model remains the most widely used.

An alternate model used to measure institution-level stability is the Merton model (also called the asset value model). It builds on Black-Scholes option pricing theory, and evaluates a firm's ability to meet its financial obligations and gauges the overall possibility of default. In this model, an institution's equity is treated as a call option on its held assets, taking into account the volatility of those assets. Put-call parity is used to price the value of the implied “put” option, which represents the firm's credit risk. Ultimately, the model measures the value of the firm's assets (weighted for volatility) at the time that the debtholders exercises their “put option” by expecting repayment. The model estimates distance to default from the gap between a firm's market-valued assets and its liabilities, adjusted for volatility in asset values. In this implementation, the option's strike price is set equal to the firm's current book value of debt.

In subsequent research, the Merton model has been modified to capture a wider array of financial activity using credit default swap data. For example, Moody's KMV-Merton model developed in 1993 by KMV LLC and acquired by Moody's in 2002, applies Merton both to calculate the probability of credit default and as part of their credit risk management system. Distance-to-default (DD) is a market-based measure of default risk derived from Merton's model and popularized by KMV, which KMV used with a proprietary database to map it to real-world probability of default (Expected Default Frequency). Distance-to-default estimates how far the market value of a firm's assets is from the value of its liabilities, adjusted for asset volatility. It has been shown that a naïve DD can be used without solving for an implied probability of default (which involves solving two non-linear equations), and it performs just as well as the computationally intensive KMV iterative approximation method despite less complexity and being transparent since it doesn't require KMV's black-box proprietary data.

=== Systemic stability measures ===
There is not yet a singular, standardized model for assessing financial system stability and for examining policies. (Note: Financial Stability Review, December 2005 (PDF) (Report). European Central Bank (ECB). 2005. pp. 131, 134–135, 141. ISSN 1830-2025. Archived (PDF) from the original on July 26, 2020. "Financial stability analysis is still in its infancy and thus, by contrast, there is … as yet no widely accepted set of measurable indicators of financial stability that can be monitored and assessed over time … Even though there is no obvious framework for summarising developments in financial stability in a single quantitative measure".) This is in contrast to most macroeconomic or monetary policy objectives (such as unemployment, economic growth, external or budgetary equilibrium, price stability, etc.) which have widely accepted measurable sets of indicators that define and measure deviations from the objective, such as inflation for price stability.

To measure systemic stability, a number of studies attempt to aggregate firm-level stability measures (z-score and distance to default) into a system-wide evaluation of stability, either by taking a simple average or weighing each measure by the institution's relative size. However, these aggregate measures fail to account for correlated risks among financial institutions. In other words, the model fails to consider the inter-connectedness between institutions, and that one institution's failure can lead to a contagion.

The First-to-Default probability, or the probability of observing one default among a number of institutions, has been proposed as a measure of systemic risk for a group of large financial institutions. This measure looks at risk-neutral default probabilities from credit default swap spreads. Unlike distance-to-default measures, the probability recognizes the interconnectedness among defaults of different institutions. However, studies focusing on probabilities of default tend to overlook the ripper effect caused by the failing of a large institution.

Another assessment of financial system stability is Systemic Expected Shortfall (SES), which measures the contribution to systemic risk by individual institutions. SES considers individual leverage level and measures the externalities created from the banking sector when these institutions fail. The model is especially apt at identifying which institutions are systemically relevant and would impact the most on the economy when it fails. One drawback of the SES method is that it is difficult to determine when the systemically important institutions are likely to fail.

To enhance predictive power, the retrospective SES measure was extended and modified in later research. The enhanced model is called SRISK, which evaluates the expected capital shortfall for a firm in a crisis scenario. To calculate this SRISK, one should first determine the Long-Run Marginal Expected Shortfall (LRMES), which measures the relationship between a firm's equity returns and the market's return (estimated using asymmetric volatility, correlation, and copula). Then, the model estimates the drop in the firm's equity value if the aggregate market experiences a 40% or larger fall in a six-month period to determine how much capital is needed in order to achieve an 8% capital to asset value ratio. In other words, SRISK gives insights into the firm's percentage of total financial sector capital shortfall. A high SRISK % indicates the biggest losers when a crisis strikes. One implication of the SES indicator is that a firm is considered “systemically risky” if it faces a high probability of capital shortage when the financial sector is weak.

Another gauge of financial stability is the distribution of systemic loss, which attempts to fill some of the gaps of the aforementioned measures. This measure incorporates three key elements: each individual institution's probability of default, the size of loss given a default, and the contagion resulting from defaults interconnected institutions.

== Latest developments ==
By current data the US FED considers cyber attacks, geopolitical risks such as war in the middle east leading to an oil price shock as the largest short term (12-18 months) risks while in the long run policy uncertainty and geopolitical risks are evaluated as largest risks. In the recent years climate related risk management became increasingly significant for the European Central Bank due to more available data and research. The World Bank adopted to the new situation by publishing climate risk country profiles. Since 2025 china applies a green finance standard and their financial stability report for the year 2023 the reports mention climate risks for the first time.
