= Ifo Institute for Economic Research =

German economic research institute

Ifo Institute - Leibniz Institute for Economic Research at the University of Munich
- Founded: 1949
- Merger of: Süddeutsches Institut für Wirtschaftsforschung; Informations- und Forschungsstelle of the Bavarian Statistical Office
- Legal status: Registered association
- Headquarters: Munich, Germany
- Location(s): Munich, Germany Dresden, Germany Fürth, Germany
- Coordinates: 48.152842°N 11.605011°E
- President: Clemens Fuest
- Affiliations: Center for Economic Studies; LMU Munich
- Staff: 244 employees
- Website: www.ifo.de

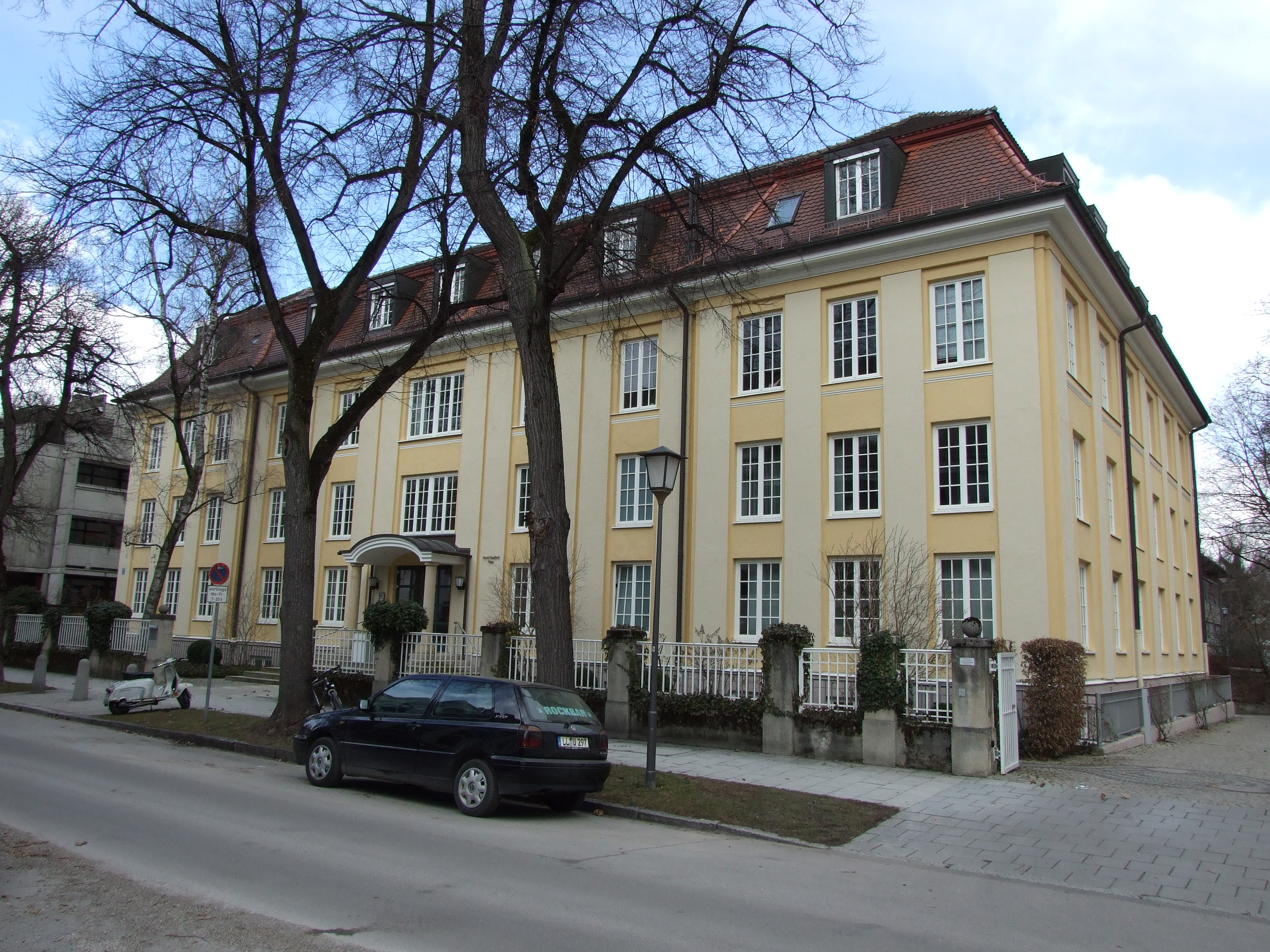
The main building of the Ifo institute in Munich. Address: Poschinger Straße 5.

The Ifo Institute for Economic Research, officially the ifo Institute – Leibniz Institute for Economic Research at the University of Munich (e.V.), is a Munich-based research institution. Ifo is an acronym from Information and Forschung (research). As one of Germany's largest economic think-tanks, it analyses economic policy and is known for its monthly Ifo Business Climate Index for Germany. According to its 2024 report, 244 employees work for the organisation. The Frankfurter Allgemeine Zeitung ranks it as Germany's most influential economics research institute.

== Ifo Business Climate Index ==
Ifo's Business Climate Index is an early indicator of economic activity released monthly since 1972. The database underlying the index is a monthly survey of 9,000 companies in the construction, manufacturing, wholesale and retail industries. The index is closely followed by investors, commentators and politics.

== Report on the German economy ==
The Ifo Institute participates in the twice yearly (spring and autumn) joint analysis of the state of the German and world economy, the so-called Gemeinschaftsdiagnose.
