= Scientific Advice Mechanism =

Service created by the European Commission

The Scientific Advice Mechanism is a service created by the European Commission which provides independent science advice on request directly to European Commissioners.

The Mechanism consists of three parts: the Group of Chief Scientific Advisors, an expert group consisting of up to seven leading scientists; SAPEA, a consortium of five European academy networks collectively representing around 120 academies and learned societies across Europe; and a unit within the European Commission (Unit RTD.02 Science Policy, Advice and Ethics) which serves as a secretariat to the Advisors.

== Group of Chief Scientific Advisors ==
The core of the Scientific Advice Mechanism is the European Commission's Group of Chief Scientific Advisors, an expert group consisting of up to seven leading scientists, selected by the European Commission assisted by an independent identification committee. The Advisors are supported by a dedicated secretariat, Unit RTD.02, informally known as the "SAM Unit", staffed by the Directorate-General for Research and Innovation and Joint Research Centre.

The Group of Chief Scientific Advisors currently consists of the following seven members:

Name	Portrait	Role in the Group	Academic position	University or institution
Naomi Ellemers			Distinguished Professor of Social and Behavioural Sciences	Utrecht University
Adam Izdebski			Independent Research Group Leader	Max Planck Institute of Geoanthropology
Martin Kahanec			Professor	Central European University and Central European Labour Studies Institute
Rafal Łukasik			Director of Research and Innovation	Łukasiewicz Centrę
Dimitra Simeonidou			Professor of High-Performance Networks and Director Smart Internet Lab	University of Bristol
Rémy Slama			Researcher in environmental health	École normale supérieure (Paris)
Mangala Srinivas			Professor of Cell Biology & Immunology,	Wageningen University and Research

Previous members of the Group of Chief Scientific Advisors include:

- Julia Slingo (2015–2016)
- Henrik Wegener (2015–2017)
- Cédric Villani (2015–2017)
- Janusz Bujnicki (2015–2020)
- Pearl Dykstra (2015–2020)
- Rolf-Dieter Heuer (2015–2020)
- Carina Keskitalo (2016–2021)
- Paul Nurse (2016–2021)
- Éva Kondorosi (2020–2023)
- Maarja Kruusmaa (2020–2024)
- Alberto Melloni (2020–2024)
- Nicole Grobert (2018–2025)
- Eric Lambin (2021–2025)
- Eva Zažímalová (2021–2025)
- Nebojša Nakićenović (2020–2025)

== SAPEA ==
SAPEA brings together around 120 academies, young academies and learned societies. Its role as part of the Scientific Advice Mechanism is to provide high-quality, independent evidence to underpin the Scientific Opinions produced by the Chief Scientific Advisors. SAPEA has the ability to convene experts from some 40 countries across Europe, spanning the disciplines of engineering, humanities, medicine, natural sciences and social sciences.

The SAPEA consortium brings together six umbrella networks jointly representing Europe's academies:

- Academia Europaea
- All European Academies
- European Academies Science Advisory Council
- European Council of Applied Sciences and Engineering
- Federation of European Academies of Medicine
- Young Academies Science Advice Structure

At present, SAPEA is funded by a grant from the European Union's Horizon Europe programme through to May 2029.

== Scientific advice ==
The Scientific Advice Mechanism has issued advice in the form of Scientific Opinions, explanatory notes or statements, supported by evidence review reports, on the following topics:

Topic	Date	Evidence review and scientific opinion
Glyphosate	June 2016	
Light-duty vehicle real-drive CO2 emissions	November 2016	
Cyber-security in the European Digital Single Market	March 2017	
New techniques in agricultural biotechnology	April 2017	
Food from the oceans	November 2017	
Novel carbon capture and utilisation technologies: research and climate aspects	May 2018	
Authorisation processes of plant protection products in Europe	June 2018	
A scientific perspective on microplastics in nature and society	January 2019	
Transforming the future of ageing	July 2019	
Making sense of science for policy under conditions of complexity and uncertainty	July 2019	
Towards a sustainable food system for Europe	April 2020	
Adaptation to climate change-related health effects	June 2020	
COVID-19, future pandemics and other crises in the global context	November 2020	
Biodegradability of plastics in the open environment	December 2020	
A systemic approach to the energy transition in Europe	June 2021	
Improving cancer screening in the European Union	March 2022	
Strategic crisis management (with European Group on Ethics in Science and New Technologies)	November 2022	
Sustainable food consumption	June 2023	
AI in science	April 2024	
One Health governance	November 2024	
Solar radiation modification	December 2024	
Advanced materials	January 2026	

== History ==
Until 2016, science advice in the European Commission was provided by a single Chief Scientific Advisor who reported directly to the President of the European Commission. The last Chief Scientific Advisor, serving from 2012 to 2014, was Dame Anne Glover.

On 1 November 2014, European Commission President Jean-Claude Juncker asked Carlos Moedas, Commissioner for Research, Innovation and Science in his mission letter to "make sure that Commission proposals and activities are based on sound scientific evidence and contribute best to our jobs and growth agenda". Following this, on 13 May 2015, Juncker announced the establishment of the Scientific Advice Mechanism. The first seven members of the Advisors were identified, following a European call for nominations, in January 2016.

In December 2016, SAPEA was officially launched to support the Advisors by providing scientific evidence review reports. Its funding was renewed in 2020 and again in 2025.
