= Barrie Pettman =

British Author and Publisher

- Born: 22 February 1944
- Died: 2 June 2017 (aged 73); Yorkshire, Great Britain
- Occupation: Businessman
- Title: Baron of Bombie
- Spouse: Maureen Pettman

Barrie Owen Pettman, Baron of Bombie (22 February 1944 – 2 June 2017) was a British author, publisher, and philanthropist. He was the co-founder and chairman emeritus of Emerald Group Publishing. A professor emeritus at the University of Hull, he was the author of a dozen books on industrial relations. He was president emeritus of Burke's Peerage and a patron of opera in England and New Zealand.

== Early life ==
Pettman was born on 22 February 1944. He received a Bachelor of Science from the University of Hull, followed by a Master of Science, a Masters in Business Administration, and a doctorate from the Cass Business School.

== Career ==
In 1967, Pettman co-founded Emerald Group Publishing, a publisher of academic journals and books, and served as its chairman. He became a multi-millionaire as a result.

He was a lecturer in industrial relations in the Department of Social Administration of his alma mater, the University of Hull, from 1970 to 1982. He was a professor of human resources at the International Management Centres from 1982 and registrar from 1983. He was director of the Manpower Unit at the University of Rhodesia in Southern Rhodesia from 1978 to 1979. He was also a visiting professor at the Canadian School of Management. He founded the International Institute of Social Economics, and he was a member of the Manpower Society from 1977 to 1991. He was a Fellow of the Chartered Management Institute.

Pettman was the editor of several academic journals, most of which were published by Emerald Group Publishing. He was the editor of the International Journal of Social Economics from 1973 to 1979, the International Journal of Manpower from 1980 to 1984, Management Research News from 1981 to 2005, Equal Opportunities International from 1981 to 2005, the International Journal of Sociology and Social Policy from 1984 to 2005, the International Journal of New Ideas from 1992 to 1998, and Managerial Law from 1975 to 2005. He was also the assistant editor of Employee Relations from 1978 to 1982 and assistant editor of Archives of Economic History.

Pettman was president emeritus of Burke's Peerage. In 2005, he published the first Yorkshire edition of Burke's Peerage and Gentry. His aim was to undo what he saw as a Southern bias in Burke's Peerage. Besides listing members of the landed gentry, he added lawyers as well as powerbrokers in showbusiness and the media, arguing that they were equally prominent.

In 1999, he became the Baron of Bombie, Kirkcudbrightshire, Scotland after he purchased the title from Sir David Hope-Dunbar of the Hope-Dunbar baronets and the defunct insurance firm Allied Dunbar. He was a member of the Reform Club and the Royal Over-Seas League. He was a Fellow of the Royal Society of Arts.

== Political affiliations ==
In 2014, Pettman donated £500,000 to the Conservative Party. As a result, he is one of their top 20 donors as of February 2015.

== Philanthropy ==
Pettman endowed a £20,000 fellowship for graduate students from New Zealand at his alma mater, the Cass Business School in London, which lists him and his wife as "major donors".

With his wife, he established in 2010 the Pettman Dare Scholarship at the Dare Foundation, a non-profit organisation which supports Opera Studies at the University of Leeds in collaboration with Opera North. In 2014, they extended their commitment up to 2020. Additionally, they have made charitable gifts to Opera North, the Buxton Festival, and the East Riding of Yorkshire Choir in England.

The Pettman Junior Academy was established in 2005 in collaboration with the University of Canterbury. Over that eight-year period Pettman and his wife donated $1.1 million to the Academy, which was split into $4000 scholarships for students. In 2011, they agreed to donate £1 million over the next five years to the Pettman Junior Academy at the University of Canterbury in Christchurch, New Zealand. Two years later, in 2013, the Academy was split from the University of Canterbury at their request. It later joined the University of Auckland. Additionally, they have donated to the Lazarus String Quartet and the 2015 International Akaroa Music Festival.

== Personal life ==
Pettman was married to Maureen Pettman, Lady of Bombie. They resided in East Yorkshire and, in winter, in Akaroa, New Zealand.

He died suddenly on 2 June 2017 at the age of 73.

== Bibliography ==
- Training and Retraining (1973)
- Labour Turnover and Retention (1975)
- Equal Pay (1975)
- Manpower Planning Workbook (1976, 1984)
- Industrial Democracy (1984)
- Discrimination in the Labour Market (1980)
- Management: A Selected Bibliography (1983)
- The New World Order (1996)
- Social Economies in Transition (1996)
- Self Development (1997)
- The Internationalisation of Franchising (1998)
- The Ultimate Wealth Book (1998)
- What Self-Made Millionnaires Really Think, Know and Do (with Richard Dobbins, 2002)
