= Klaus Zimmermann (economist) =

German economist

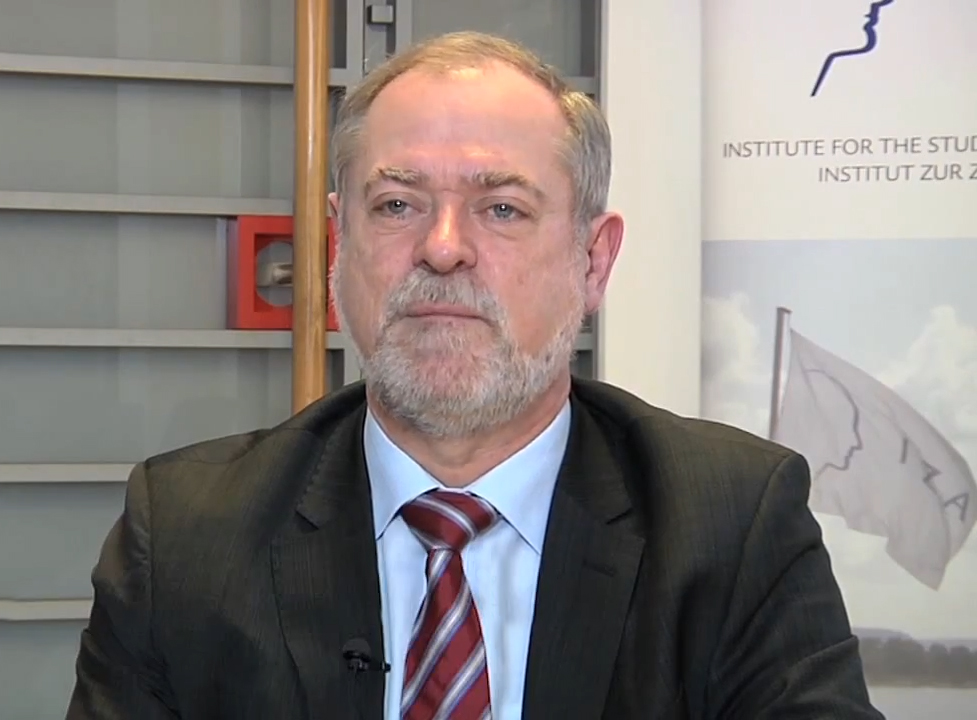
Klaus F. Zimmermann, 2012

Klaus Felix Zimmermann (born December 2, 1952) is a German economist and emeritus professor of economics at Bonn University. Additionally, he is an honorary professor at Maastricht University, the Free University of Berlin and the Renmin University of China, as well as president of the Global Labor Organization. His research interests include population, labour, development and migration, and he has been described as one of the leading economists on the topic of migration.

== Biography ==
Born in Göppingen, Zimmermann obtained a graduate diploma, his PhD and his habilitation in economics from the University of Mannheim in 1978, 1985 and 1987, respectively. After teaching as a research associate at the University of Mannheim from 1978 to 1984, Zimmermann became an assistant professor in Mannheim. He subsequently held positions including research fellow at the Catholic University of Louvain, senior research fellow at the WZB Berlin Social Science Center and Heisenberg Fellow at the German Research Foundation. In 1989, Zimmermann accepted a position as Full Professor of Economic Theory at LMU Munich, before moving to the University of Bonn as Full Professor of Economics in 1998. In Bonn, Zimmermann became the founding director of the Institute for the Study of Labor (IZA), a position which he held until 2016. From 2000 to 2011, Zimmermann was also the president of the German Institute for Economic Research (DIW) in Berlin. He has been an honorary professor at the Free University of Berlin since 2001 and at the Renmin University of China since 2006. In 2016, Zimmermann left IZA prior to a major restructuring and accepted an honorary professorship at Maastricht University. A year later, Zimmermann helped found and became the president of the Global Labor Organization, an international research and policy network on labour, demographics and human resources.

Throughout his career, Zimmermann has held positions as visiting professor at the University of Pennsylvania, Harvard University, Princeton University, Simon Fraser University, Kyoto University, Dartmouth College, Humboldt University of Berlin, Tilburg University, Macquarie University, the University of Melbourne and the University of Dortmund. His memberships include the American Economic Association, European Economic Association, German Economic Association, Econometric Society, Academia Europaea, German Academy of Sciences at Berlin and Royal Economic Society. He has held editorial positions at journals including the Journal of Population Economics (which he founded in 1987), Economic Policy, European Economic Review, Journal of Applied Econometrics, Labour Economics and the International Journal of Manpower.

== Research ==
Klaus Zimmermann's research centres on issues of population, labour, development and migration. He ranks among the top 1% of economists registered on IDEAS/RePEc. He is a frequent co-author of Amelie Constant, Martin Kahanec and Ulf Rinne.

== Bibliography (selected) ==
=== Research on migration and labour mobility ===
- Merkle, L., Zimmermann, K.F. (1992). Savings, Remittances, and Return Migration. Economics Letters, 38(1), pp. 77–81.
- Schmidt, C.M., Stilz, A., Zimmermann, K.F. (1994). Mass Migration, Unions, and Government Intervention. Journal of Public Economics, 55(2), pp. 185–201.
- New, J.P., Zimmermann, K.F. (1994). Native Wage Impacts of Foreign Labor: A Random Effects Panel Analysis. Journal of Population Economics, 7(2), pp. 177–192.
- Zimmermann, K.F. (1995). Tackling the European Migration Problem. Journal of Economic Perspectives, 9(2), pp. 45–62.
- Zimmermann, K.F. (1996). European Migration: Push and Pull. International Regional Science Review, 19(1–2), pp. 95–128.
- Bauer, T., Zimmermann, K.F. (1998). Causes of international migration: a survey. In: Crossing Borders: Regional and Urban Perspectives on International Migration
- Bauer, T.K., Zimmermann, K.F. (1999). Assessment of Possible Migration Pressure and its Labour Market Impact Following EU Enlargement to Central and Eastern Europe. IZA Research Report Series, No. 3.
- Gang, I., Zimmermann, K.F. (2000). Is Child Like Parent? Educational Attainment and Ethnic Origin. Journal of Population Economics, 7(2), pp. 177–192.
- Bauer, T.K., Lofstrom, M., Zimmermann, K.F. (2000). Immigration policy, assimilation of immigrants, and natives' sentiments towards immigrants: Evidence from 12 OECD countries. Swedish Economic Policy Review, 7, pp. 11–53.
- Brücker, H. et al. (2002). Managing Migration in the European Welfare State. Oxford: Oxford University Press.
- Zimmermann, K.F. (2005). European labor mobility: challenges and potentials. De Economist, 153(4), pp. 425–450.
- Zimmermann, K.F. (2005). European Migration: What Do We Know? Oxford: Oxford University Press.
- Constant, A., Zimmermann, K.F. (2006). The Making of Entrepreneurs in Germany: Are Native Men and Immigrants Alike? Small Business Economics, 26(3), pp. 279–300.
- Zaiceva, A., Zimmermann, K.F. (2008). Scale, diversity, and determinants of labour migration in Europe. Oxford Review of Economic Policy, 24(3), pp. 427–451.
- Constant, A.F., Zimmermann, K.F. (2008). Measuring ethnic identity and its impact on economic behavior. Journal of the European Economic Association, 6(2–3), pp. 424–433.
- Bonin, H. et al. (2008). Geographic Mobility in the European Union: Optimising its Economic and Social Benefits. IZA Research Report Series, No. 19.
- Kahanec, M., Zimmermann, K.F. (2009). EU Labor Markets After Postenlargement Migration. Berlin/Heidelberg: Springer.
- Constant, A.F., Gataulina, L., Zimmermann, K.F. (2009). Ethnosizing Immigrants. Journal of Economic Behavior & Organization, 69(3), pp. 274–287.
- Constant, A.F., Zimmermann, K.F. (2011). Circular and repeat migration: counts of exits and years away from the host country. Population Research and Policy Review, 30(4), pp. 495–515.

=== Research on econometrics ===
- Veall, M.R., Zimmermann, K.F. (1992). Pseudo-R2s in the Ordinal Probit Model. Journal of Mathematical Sociology, 16(4), pp. 333–342.
- Veall, M.R., Zimmermann, K.F. (1994). Goodness of Fit Measures in the Tobit Model. Oxford Bulletin of Economics and Statistics, 56(4), pp. 485–499.
- Veall, M.R., Zimmermann, K.F. (2006). Pseudo-R2 Measures for Some Common Limited Dependent Variable Models. Journal of Economic Surveys, 10(3), pp. 241–259.
- Askitas, N., Zimmermann, K.F. (2009). Google Econometrics and Unemployment Forecasting. Applied Economics Quarterly, 55, pp. 107–129.

=== Other research ===
- Schmidt, C.M., Zimmermann, K.F. (1991). Work Characteristics, Firm Size and Wages. Review of Economics and Statistics, 705–710.
- Mühleisen, M., Zimmermann, K.F. (1994). A Panel Analysis of Job Changes and Unemployment. European Economic Review, 38(3), pp. 793–801.
