= Slovak Economic Association =

- Abbreviation: SEA
- Formation: 26 June 2010
- Type: Learned society
- Headquarters: Bratislava, Slovakia
- Region served: Slovakia
- Official language: Slovak, English
- Website: www.slovakecon.sk

Slovak Economic Association (SEA, Slovak: Slovenská ekonomická spoločnosť) is an association of professional economists in Slovakia. It was formed on 26 June 2010 at the Bratislava Economic Meeting conference.

Since 2008, the association has organized annual conferences. Notably, in 2017 the Nobel Prize winner Robert F. Engle gave a keynote speech at the SEA conference in Košice.

In 2018, the Association started awarding a bi-annual award to a Slovak economist under 40 years of age for an outstanding contribution to economic research and evidence-based policy making in the country named after Martin Filko.

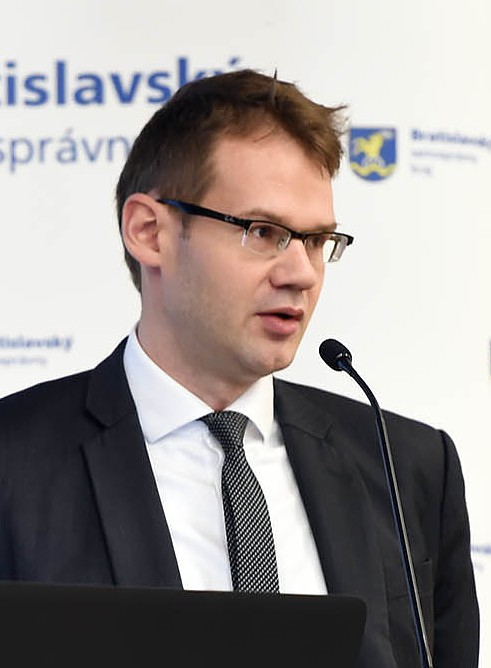
Martin Filko, co-founder of SEA

SEA is a member of the International Economic Association.

== Chairs ==
The current chair of SEA for the 2022–2024 term is the Zeppelin University professor Jarko Fidrmuc.

The former chairs were

- Mikuláš Luptáčik (2010–2012), University of Economics in Bratislava
- Maroš Servátka (2012–2014), Macquarie Business School
- Július Horváth (2014–2016), Central European University
- Martin Kahanec (2016–2018), Central European University, Central European Labour Studies Institute and University of Economics in Bratislava
- Martin Šuster (2018–2020), Council for Budget Responsibility
- Eduard Baumöhl (2020–2022), University of Economics in Bratislava
- Jarko Fidrmuc (2022 - 2024), Zeppelin University Friedrichshafen
- Zuzana Fungáčová (2024 - 2026), Bank of Finland
- Andrej Svorenčík (2026 - ), Universitat de Barcelona

== Fellows ==
As of 2023, SEA has 40 Fellows. Notable SEA Fellows include:

- Miroslav Beblavý, economist and politician.
- Lubos Pastor, professor University of Chicago Booth School of Business
- Ľudovít Ódor, former deputy governor National Bank of Slovakia (2018–2023) and former prime Minister of Slovakia (2023).
