= Central European Labour Studies Institute =

Research institute based in Slovakia

- Stredoeurópsky Inštitút pre Výskum Práce
- Abbreviation: CELSI
- Established: 2008; 18 years ago
- Founders: Marta Kahancová & Martin Kahanec
- Type: Research institute
- Headquarters: Zvolenská ul. 29; 821 09 Bratislava
- Location: Slovakia
- Coordinates: 48.1485982°N 17.135433°E
- Region served: Central Europe
- Methods: Research, publications, conferences
- Field: Labour studies
- Official languages: Slovak & English
- Managing Director: Marta Kahancová
- Scientific Director: Martin Kahanec
- Deputy Director: Monika Martišková
- Financial Controlling: Elena Buzášová
- Website: www.celsi.sk/en/

The Central European Labour Studies Institute (CELSI) is a non-profit research institute based in Bratislava, Slovakia that fosters multidisciplinary research about the functioning of labour markets and institutions, work and organizations, business and society, and ethnicity and migration in the economic, social, and political life of modern societies.

CELSI conducts research on labour markets, promotes evidence based policymaking to support prosperous, decent, interdisciplinary collaboration and the professional development of doctoral researchers.

== Formation ==
CELSI was founded in 2008 by Martin Kahanec and Marta Kahancova. At that time Marta Kahancova was a postdoctoral research fellow at the Max Planck Institute for the Study of Societies, Cologne, Germany, and Martin Kahanec was the deputy program director at the Institute for the Study of Labor, Bonn, Germany and currently is a professor at the Department of Public Policy at the Central European University in Vienna, Austria.

Their objective was to create an institution where ideas and knowledge about labour markets in Central and Eastern Europe could be nurtured and shared. Therefore, as well as being an independent research institute with its own in-house research team, CELSI was also conceived as a means for building a network of research fellows across the globe. CELSI aims to contribute to evidence-based policy-making by providing salient knowledge about the functioning of labor markets.

== Research ==
CELSI’s research is published in international peer-reviewed journals, such as the Journal of Population Economics, Economics of Transition, International Journal of Manpower, European Journal of Industrial Relations, International Journal of Social Research Methodology, International Migration Review, and the IZA Journal of Migration. Books authored or edited by CELSI researchers have been published by renowned international publishers, including Palgrave, Edward Elgar, or Springer; book chapters appeared in edited volumes published by Oxford University Press. CELSI has participated in international research projects, including EU’s Framework Programmes and Horizon programmes. CELSI was an affiliate partner of the Marie Curie International Training Network EDUWORKS.

== Research Areas ==
Currently, CELSI focuses on the following research areas:

- (Labour) Data and Measurement
- Caring Societies
- New Forms of Work
- Labour Mobility
- Inequalities and Vulnerabilities
- Welfare and Labour Policy
- Social Dialogue and Collective Bargaining
- Green and Digital Transitions

== Discussion Papers ==
CELSI’s flagship publication platform is its Discussion Paper series, which presents papers by academics from various different disciplines related to labour and migration issues. Its objective is to promote the sharing of knowledge and expertise between diverse social science disciplines, such as economics, political science, social anthropology and social psychology.

== Research Reports and Policy Briefs ==
CELSI also publishes a Research Report series, which presents detailed policy studies by CELSI’s in-house researchers as well as associate researchers, often in cooperation with international organizations, such as the European Commission and the World Bank. Policy CELSI also publishes a Policy Brief series to disseminate the key findings from its research work to a broader policy audience.

== Recognition ==
In 2024, CELSI has been listed as the #53 among top think tanks globally, (No. 4 in Central and Eastern Europe) and the #2 economic research institute in Slovakia by RePEc. Its Scientific Director, Dr. Martin Kahanec, is listed as the #1 contributing author. CELSI regularly ranks among top 200 institutions in the field of Economics of Human Migration in the world in the RePEc rankings.

SInce 2021 CELSI Scientific Director Martin Kahanec has been an Elected member of Academia Europaea, the European Academy of Humanities, Letters and Sciences, and Chairperson of its Section Committee "Economics, Business and Management Sciences".
