= Clemens Fuest =

German economist (born 1968)

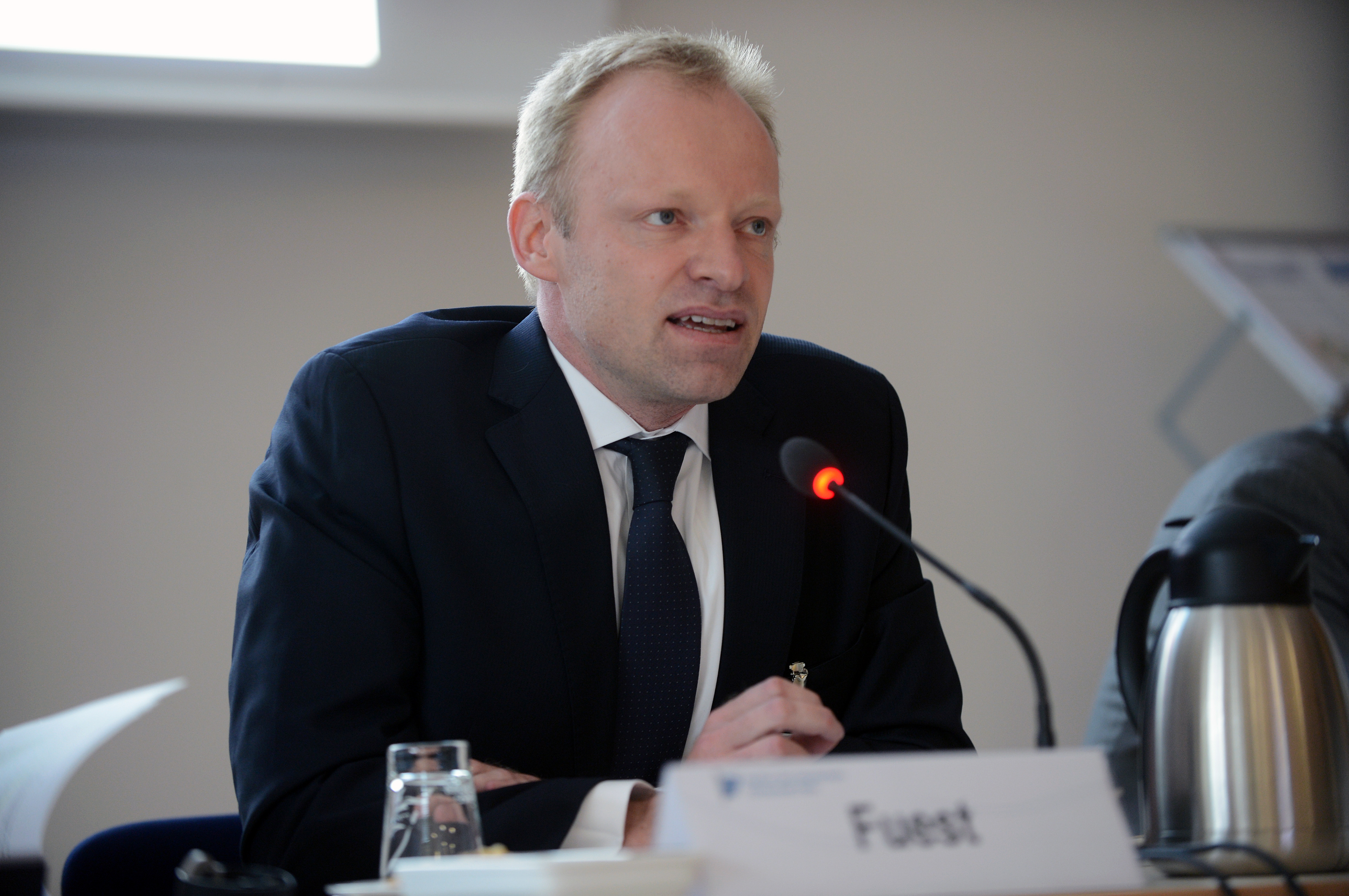
- Fuest in 2012
- Born: 23 August 1968 (age 58); Münster, West Germany

Academic background
- Education: Ruhr University Bochum; University of Mannheim; University of Cologne

Academic work
- Discipline: Financial economics
- Institutions: LMU Munich; University of Oxford; Ifo Institute for Economic Research
- Website: Information at IDEAS / RePEc

Clemens Fuest (born 23 August 1968) is a German economist who has been President of the Ifo Institute for Economic Research and director of the Center for Economic Studies at LMU Munich since 2016.

== Early life and education ==
Fuest was born in Münster in 1968 and grew up in Geseke with two brothers. His mother is French. Both parents were teachers. His uncle was the financial economist Winfried Fuest.

Fuest obtained his Abitur from Gymnasium Antonianum Geseke in 1987. He studied economics at the Ruhr University Bochum from 1987 to 1989 and continued his studies at the University of Mannheim from 1989 to 1991, earning his degree in Economics in 1991. He pursued his doctoral studies at the University of Cologne from 1991 to 1994, receiving his Dr.rer.pol. summa cum laude in 1994 with a thesis on a fiscal constitution for the European Union. From Cologne he moved to Munich to work with the economist Bernd Huber. In 2000, he completed his habilitation at LMU Munich. His research at the time focused on taxation policy and unemployment.

=== Career ===
In 2008, Fuest served as a member of the Independent Expert Group to the Commission on Scottish Devolution. He was member and chairman of the Council of Economic Advisors at the German Federal Ministry of Finance.

Between 2008 and 2013, Fuest was professor of business taxation at the University of Oxford and Research Director of the Oxford University Centre for Business Taxation, which is part of the Saïd Business School.

From March 2013, Fuest served as President of the Centre for European Economic Research (ZEW) in Mannheim and professor at the University of Mannheim. Since 2013, he has also been serving on the advisory board of the Stability Council, a body devised as part of Germany’s national implementation of the European Fiscal Compact. That same year, he joined Henrik Enderlein, Marcel Fratzscher, Jakob von Weizsäcker and others in founding the Glienicker Gruppe, a group of pro-European lawyers, economists, and political scientists.

In 2014, Fuest was appointed by the Council of the European Union to be part of the High Level Group on Own Resources, led by Mario Monti. Since 2015, he has been serving as one of two scientific advisors to the Commission on the Minimum Wage at the Federal Ministry of Labour and Social Affairs. In 2025, the government of Chancellor Friedrich Merz appointed Fuest as member of an expert commission to advise Minister of Finance Lars Klingbeil on reforming Germany's rules on public debt, co-chaired by Stephan Weil, Eckhardt Rehberg and Stephan Müller.

== Personal life ==
Fuest’s wife Ana María is Colombian. The couple has three sons. He is interested in literature, classical music, skiing and hiking.

== Other activities ==
=== Corporate boards ===
- HSBC Trinkaus & Burkhardt, Member of the Advisory Board
- Landesbank Baden-Württemberg (LBBW), Member of the Advisory Board (since 2014)
- Ernst & Young Germany, Member of the Scientific Advisory Board (since 2008)

=== Non-profit organizations ===
- Foundation for Family Businesses, Member of the Board of Trustees
- Hochschule für Bildende Künste Braunschweig, Member of the University Council (since 2011)
- European Academy of Sciences and Arts, Member (since 2010)
- International Institute of Public Finance (IIFP), Vice President of the Board (2009–2018), President of the Board (since 2018)
- Hanns Martin Schleyer Foundation, Friedwart Bruckhaus Prize, Member of the Jury
- Wirtschaftsrat der CDU, Member of the Scientific Advisory Board
- Institute for the Study of Labor (IZA), Fellow (since 2007)
- Hanns Martin Schleyer Foundation, Friedwart Bruckhaus Prize, Member of the Jury
- German Academy of Science and Engineering, Member
- American Economic Association, Member

=== Editorial boards ===
- Canadian Journal of Economics, Advisory Editor
- Fiscal Studies, Member of the Editorial Board
- Wirtschaftsdienst, Member of the Scientific Advisory Board
- ORDO, Member of the Editorial Board

== Recognition ==
Clemens Fuest was awarded the Bayerischer Maximiliansorden für Wissenschaft und Kunst in 2023. His academic contributions were recognized with an Honorary Doctorate from the Karlsruhe Institute of Technology in 2017. In 1998 he won the Knut Wicksell Prize of the European Public Choice Society.

In 2013 he received the Gustav Stolper Award.
