= Özbilgin =

Özbilgin is a Turkish surname. Notable people with the surname include:

- Mustafa F. Özbilgin (born 1970), Turkish-born British sociologist
- Mustafa Yücel Özbilgin (1942–2006), Turkish supreme court magistrate
