= Kuldar =

Estonian male given name

- Gender: Male
- Language: Estonian
- Name day: 16 August

Origin
- Region of origin: Estonia

Kuldar is an Estonian-language male given name.

People named Kuldar include:

- Kuldar Leis (born 1968), Estonian entrepreneur and politician
- Kuldar Sikk (born 1979), Estonian rally co-driver
- Kuldar Sink (1942–1995), Estonian composer and flautist
