= Bujnicki =

Bujnicki (Belarusian: Буйніцкі) is a surname also spelled Buynitsky or Buinitsky. Notable people with this surname include:

- Dmitry Buinitsky (born 1997), Belarusian ice hockey player
- Ihnat Bujnicki (1861–1917), Belarusian actor and theatre director
- Janusz Bujnicki (born 1975), Polish biologist
- Kazimierz Bujnicki (1788–1878), Polish writer
- Teodor Bujnicki (1907–1944), Polish poet
