= Mustafa Özbilgin =

Mustafa Özbilgin may refer to:

- Mustafa F. Özbilgin, Turkish sociologist
- Mustafa Yücel Özbilgin, Turkish supreme court magistrate
