= German Institute for Economic Research =

Research institute in Berlin, Germany

Coordinates: 52°30′44″N 13°23′19.32″E

DIW Berlin

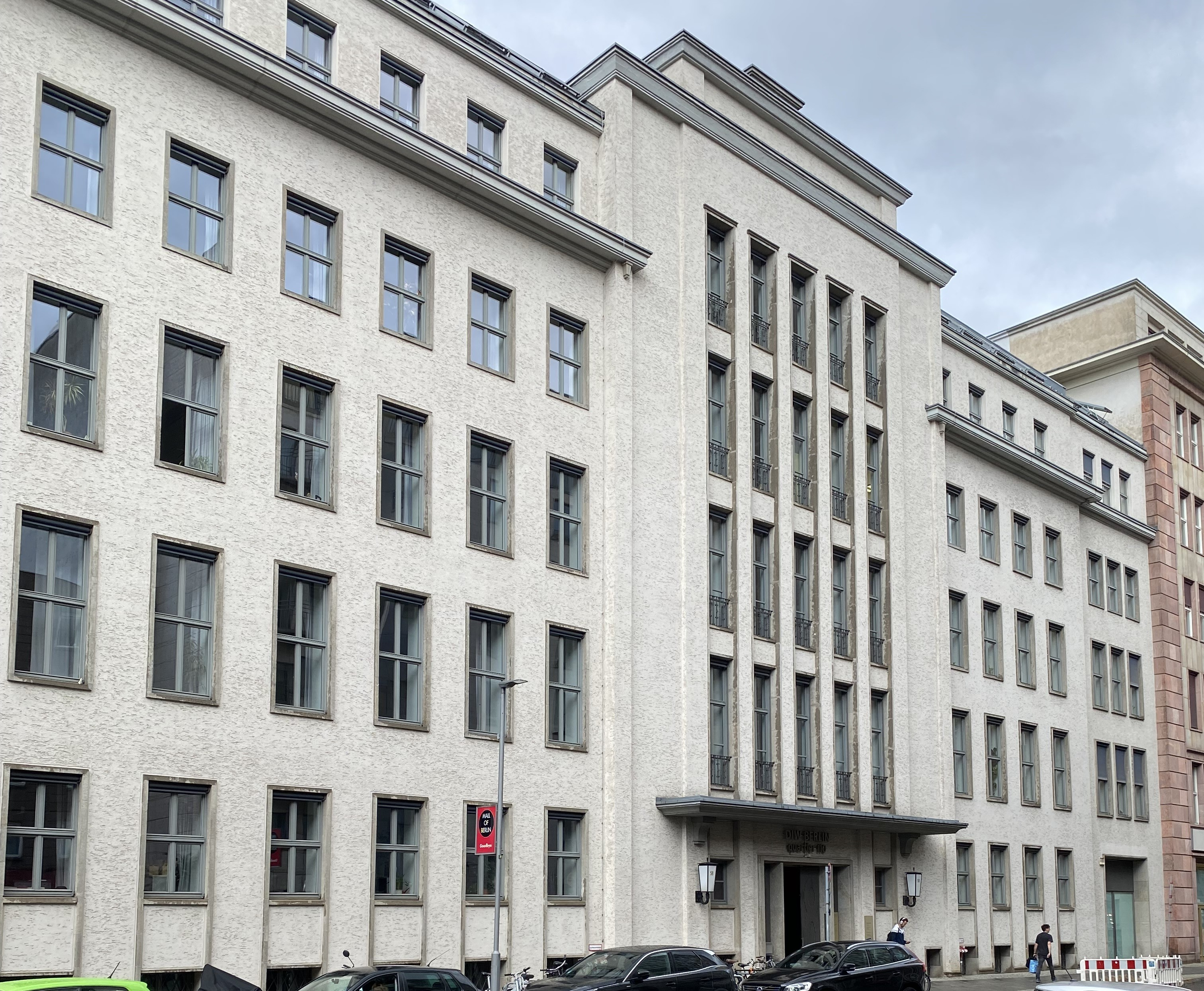
- DIW building on Mohrenstraße 58, Berlin
- Established: 1925
- Founder: Ernst Wagemann
- President: Marcel Fratzscher
- Staff: 360
- Website: www.diw.de

The German Institute for Economic Research (German: Deutsches Institut für Wirtschaftsforschung), more commonly known as DIW Berlin (German pronunciation: [deːʔiːˈveː]), is an economic research institute in Germany, involved in economic research and policy advice. According to Repec, it is among the top-10 percent of non-profit economic research institutions worldwide. Financed with public grants from the Berlin Senate Department for Economics, Technology and Research and the Federal Department for Economics and Technology. DIW Berlin was founded in 1925 as the Institute for Business Cycle Research and took its current name in 1943.

DIW Berlin presents its research results in science journals, within the scope of national and international scientific events as well as at workshops, symposia and colloquia. Current economic and structural data, forecasts and advice as well as services in the area of quantitative economics are provided to decision makers in economics and policy and the broad public. Furthermore, the research results often meet with a major response in the news media.

== Leadership and organisation ==
The legal status of DIW Berlin is that of a registered association. The association's bodies are the Members, the Board of Trustees, the executive board and the Scientific Advisory Board. To date, there are 185 employees, 102 of them being researchers.

=== Executive board ===
- Marcel Fratzscher
- Angelica E. Röhr
- Stefan Liebig

=== Research departments ===
The institute is divided into ten research departments, which are:

- The Department of Macroeconomics focuses on the empirical and theoretical analysis of aggregate economic developments as well as national and international economic policy.
- The Department Forecasting and Economic Policy uses modern macroeconomic methods to analyze economic policy issues. Economic forecasting is a key component of the department's work.
- The Department of International Economics focuses on monetary and financial issues affecting the global economy. It concentrates on two key activities: examining international financial markets in terms of their economic functionality and analyzing the contribution of financial development to the goal of shared growth in developing and emerging countries.
- The Department of Energy, Transportation and Environment researches different strategies of sustainable development in energy, transportation and the environment in order to formulate sound policy recommendations.
- The Department Climate Policy uses empirical and theoretical methods to explore Germany and Europe's transition to sustainable energy—for example, by analyzing policies related to energy efficiency in buildings as well as the shift to sustainable, climate-friendly power production.
- The Department of Competition and Consumers aims to produce robust evidence of how society and markets function. Its research combines approaches from industrial economics with behavioral and experimental economics, thus enabling a comprehensive analysis of strategic interactions, market allocations, and human behavior.
- The Department of Firms and Markets analyzes firms’ strategic behavior and its impact on efficiency, productivity, and growth as well as the institutional and political environment in which firms operate.
- The Department of Public Economics analyzes how financial, fiscal, and social policies influence economic decisions made by individuals, households, and companies.
- The Department of Education and Family explores education and family-related issues primarily from a microeconomic perspective. One key question is the extent to which it is possible to fully develop the human potential of a country's economy.
- The Socio-Economic Panel Study (SOEP) is a research-based infrastructure facility at DIW Berlin funded by the German Federal Ministry of Education and Research (BMBF) and state governments. The SOEP is one of the world's largest and longest-running surveys of individuals and private households. Numerous studies based on SOEP data examine mechanisms behind the distribution of social resources.

Service departments

- Communications
- Information Technology
- Library
- Management Services
- Office Management
- Legal Department and Human Resources

== Graduate Center ==
Since 2006 the Graduate Center (GC) of DIW Berlin offers about 15 scholarships per year for PhD positions in economics in cooperation with Berlin's largest universities: Free University of Berlin, Humboldt University of Berlin, and Technische Universität Berlin. The Graduate Center is located within the DIW building in the center of Berlin. The academic research of students focuses on applied topics. The four-year program is divided into two parts: while students receive academic training in economics and related social sciences during the first year, in years two to four on-the-job training in DIW research projects leads them to complete their doctoral theses. The application period is between January and March.

== Co-operations ==
A broad range of predominantly external Research Directors, Research Professors and Research Affiliates research along with the employees of DIW Berlin. They co-operate for a specific time, perform cross sectional tasks, care about scientific surveys (such as diploma thesis, dissertations) and release important pulses for the institute.

The DIW is also part of the Leibniz Association (Leibniz-Gemeinschaft), a collection of non-university research institutes in Germany. Along with five other leading institutes, the DIW publishes a joint report on the state of the German economy, the Gemeinschaftsdiagnose (Joint Economic Forecast).

== Financing ==
More than half of the institute's budget is derived from public grants, which DIW Berlin receives as research funding from the State of Berlin and the Federal Government in equal parts. This sum is supplemented by income from projects, research contracts with third parties, trustee memberships and donations. Because of its financial structure DIW Berlin is member of the Leibniz Association (WGL).

In 2022, news media reported critically about payments made by Uber to prominent academics and highlighted the role of a consultancy arm of DIW. DIW, in collaboration with Justus Haucap, had agreed to produce a study on "consumer benefits from a liberalisation of the German taxi market", for what a news leak suggested was a fee of €48,000 plus VAT. Haucap launched the report at events for influencers and politicians in Berlin.

== Publications ==
DIW Berlin is an economic research institute that supplies the public with economic and structural data, forecasts, research reports, and services in quantitative economics. Research results are presented in the institute's own publications and in publications edited in cooperation with the institute.

=== Economic situation forecasts ===
Forecasts about current and future trends in Germany, EU and world economy are published on a regular basis by DIW Berlin.

=== Publications ===
Wochenbericht

Readily available, condensed information on current economic policy issues. Published weekly in German (Wochenbericht des DIW Berlin).

DIW Economic Bulletin

The DIW Economic Bulletin is a DIW Berlin online publication. At irregular intervals selected articles of the Wochenbericht are being published online in English..

Quarterly Journal of Economic Research

Each issue concentrates on a topic relevant to the current economic policy debate. It includes detailed information on research findings and their methodological basis.

Discussion papers

The papers are presenting pre-publications of research results.

DIW Berlin: Policy Advice Compact

DIW Berlin furnishes opinions for the Federal Government of Germany, the Commission of the European Union, the Ministries of Federal and State Governments, political parties, interest groups and associations, and the social partners. In the series "DIW Berlin: Policy Advice Compact" these research reports will be published.

Applied Economics Quarterly (Konjunkturpolitik)

Applied Economics Quarterly is an international journal publishing empirical research on issues with relevance for all areas of economic policy. AEQ is published four times a year in English.

=== Events ===
Industrial Conference

The Industrial Conference is the traditional institutionalised forum for exchange between the DIW Berlin and the business sector. Since October 1960, the forum has met twice a year - May and November. Approximately one hundred representatives of enterprises, business associations and economic sciences participate regularly. Since the Federal Government moved to Berlin, the conference has been attracting increasing numbers of participants from politics. The conference understands itself to be a platform for dialogs on different viewpoints and opinions.

Lunchtime Meetings

The Berlin Lunchtime Meetings are a joint series of monthly expert talks hosted by the Centre for Economic Policy Research (CEPR), the DIW, and the IZA Institute of Labor Economics. The seminars serve as a platform for leading European and international researchers to address important policy issues, and as a forum for debate and discussion among researchers, policy makers and the private sector.

== History ==
1925 In July 1925 Ernst Wagemann founds DIW Berlin, which is originally called Institute for Business Cycle Research, and becomes the first President.

1928 In the context of the Quarterly Journal of Economic Research, Arthur Hanau publishes his dissertation "The phenomenon of cyclical development" and becomes head of the agricultural market research in Germany. Using his concept of the "pork cycle" is still a popular way of explaining students of economics the relationship between demand and supply.

1933–1945 During the Nazi Regime, Wagemann is removed from his office. He is questioned several times by the Gestapo and even arrested for a while in 1942. By the end of 1943, the Institute for Business Cycle Research, renamed in German Institute for Economic Research, is partially relocated to Feldberg, Mecklenburg.

1945 Postwar Berlin political leader Ferdinand Friedensburg takes on being the President of the German Institute for Economic Research until 1968. Following the war, the main focus of economic research lies upon economic issues within the city of Berlin.

1950 The first Wochenbericht (Weekly Report) after the war is published, covering a detailed report about "Germany's economic situation at the end of 1945".

1956 The German Institute for Economic Research moves into a new building in Koenigin-Luise-Straße.

1960 For the first time, the so-called "Grundlinien der Wirtschaftsentwicklung", forecasts about current and future trends in Germany, EU and world economy, are published. They are referring to the year of 1961.

1968 Klaus Dieter Arndt becomes new President of the German Institute for Economic Research.

1972 Newly established departments are the Department of Transportation, the Department of Public Finance and the Department of Money and Capital Markets.

1975 Karl Koenig takes on being the President of the German Institute for Economic Research.

1979 The German Institute for Economic Research publishes the Wochenbericht "Eine mittelfristige Strategie zur Wiedergewinnung der Vollbeschaeftigung", proposing strategies for re-establishing full employment in Germany. Taking this report into account, the federal government derives a programme for future investment in year 1977–1980, one of the very few programmes which consequence is a noticeable drop in German unemployment rates. Prof. Dr. Hans-Jürgen Krupp becomes new President of the German Institute for Economic Research.

1989 The Socio-Economic Panel Study (SOEP) is now part of the German Institute for Economic Research. The main focus of the service institution SOEP is on basic research and scientific services. The Socio-Economic Panel regularly surveys 10,000 private households in a representative longitudinal study. The data acquired is analysed within and outside the German Institute for Economic Research, the results are then used for the analysis of income and labour force developments.

1990 The German Institute for Economic Research disapproves of a monetary union with the former GDR. In the case of a monetary union, the only way for the GDR to compensate their difference in productivity would be a significant decrease of the wage level. A unification of wage levels would lead to mass dismissals and enormous business shutdowns. The GDR people would become welfare recipients of the Federal Republic of Germany.

1994 On behalf of Greenpeace, the German Institute for Economic Research analyses the economic consequences of an ecological fiscal reform. The model of ecotax, short for ecological taxation, has been enacted in Germany by means of three laws in the following years.

2000 Klaus F. Zimmermann becomes new President of the DIW. From now on, there are seven Research Departments. Thus, the DIW is able to react flexible to new respective current economic and social political topics. Main focus of economic research is now lying upon information society and competition, public economics and innovation. The institute also aims at increasing its number of international cooperations and its participation in research networks worldwide.

2003 DIW Berlin publishes its first Konjunkturprognose (Economic Barometer), an up-to-date indicator of Germany's economic trends.

2006 With the founding of the DIW Graduate Center, the Institute dedicates itself to furthering the careers of young scientists.

2007 DIW Berlin relocates from Berlin-Dahlem to Mohrenstraße in Berlin-Mitte, marking a return to the city's government district.

2013 Marcel Fratzscher becomes new President of the DIW.

2016 The Berlin Economics Research Associates (BERA), a postdoctoral program funded by the Leibniz Association to promote the careers of young scientists, is established at DIW Berlin.

=== Presidents ===
- 1925–1945 Ernst Wagemann
- 1945–1968 Ferdinand Friedensburg
- 1968–1974 Klaus-Dieter Arndt
- 1975–1979 Karl Koenig
- 1979–1988 Hans-Jürgen Krupp
- 1988–1999 Lutz Hoffmann
- 2000–2011 Klaus Zimmermann
- 2011–2013 Gert G. Wagner
- 2013–present Marcel Fratzscher

== Literature ==
- Silke Anger. Overtime Work in Germany. The Investment Character of Unpaid Hours, Shaker 2006.
- Rainer Winkelmann, Klaus F. Zimmermann, Can Germany Stand up to International Locational Competition? Duncker und Humblot 2005.
- Klaus F. Zimmermann, European Migration: What Do We Know? Oxford University Press. Oxford/New York 2005.
- Marco Caliendo, Microeconometric Evaluation of Labour Market Policies, Springer, 2005.
- Brigitte Preissl, Harry Bouwman, and Charles Steinfield, E-Life after the Dot Com Bust, Physica-Verlag, 2004.
- Janet Zollinger Giele and Elke Holst: Changing Life Patterns in Western Industrial Societies (Advances in Life Course Research). 2003.
