= Hans-Jürgen Krupp =

German politician (1933–2024)

Hamburg State Minister of Finance
- In office 1988–1991

Hamburg State Minister for Economic Affairs
- In office 1991–2001

Second Mayor of the Free and Hanseatic city of Hamburg
- In office 1991–2001
- Preceded by: Ingo von Münch
- Succeeded by: Erhard Rittershaus

Personal details
- Born: 15 April 1933 Elbing (now Elbląg), East Prussia
- Died: 29 July 2024 (aged 91) Darmstadt, Hesse
- Party: SPD

Hans-Jürgen Krupp (15 April 1933 – 29 July 2024) was a German politician, economist, professor and former President of the University of Frankfurt. He was a representative of the Social Democratic Party (SPD) and state minister in Hamburg.

Krupp was born in 1933 in Elbing, East Prussia. He studied at the Technische Hochschule Darmstadt (now, Darmstadt University of Technology) from 1952 to 1957, and received his doctorate (Dr. rer. pol.) in 1961. From 1969 to 1975 Krupp was professor for economics and social politics at the University of Frankfurt, from 1987 to 1993 also at Technische Universität Berlin. From 1973 to 1975 he was vice-president, and until 1979 president of the University of Frankfurt. In 1979 Krupp became president of the German Institute for Economic Research.

In 1988 Krupp became state minister of Finance, and in 1991 state minister for Economic Affairs and second mayor of Hamburg. In 2001 he retired.
