= Eric Lambin =

Eric Lambin (born 23 September 1962) is a Belgian geographer. He is a professor at the Université catholique de Louvain and Stanford University.

From 1999 to 2005, he was Chair of the Land Use and Land Cover Change (LUCC) project (a joint initiative of the International Geosphere-Biosphere Programme (IGBP) and the International Human Dimensions Programme (IHDP)).

In July 2019, Lambin received the 2019 Blue Planet Prize for a research project which cross-referenced satellite data with the socioeconomic class of the areas it came from. The intent of the research was to find and highlight the impact of economic globalization on local ecosystems and their residents, and found that reforestation in one area of the world corresponded to an increased timber industry in others.

Between 2020 and 2025, Lambin served as a Chief Scientific Advisor to the European Commission.

== Publications ==
In addition to numerous scientific articles, he has published books intended for a wider audience:

- La Terre sur un fil, éditions Le Pommier, 2004 ISBN 9782746501980 - rééd. 2010 ISBN 9782746504738
  - The Middle Path, English translation, University of Chicago Press ISBN 9780226468532
- Une écologie du bonheur, éditions Le Pommier, 2009 ISBN 9782746503816
- co-author, with Christophe André, Ilios Kotsou, Caroline Lesire and others Psychologie positive, le bonheur dans tous ses états, éditions Jouvence ISBN 9782883538566
- Le consommateur planétaire, éditions Le Pommier, 2015 ISBN 9782746507333
