= Éva Kondorosi =

Hungarian-French biochemist (born 1948)

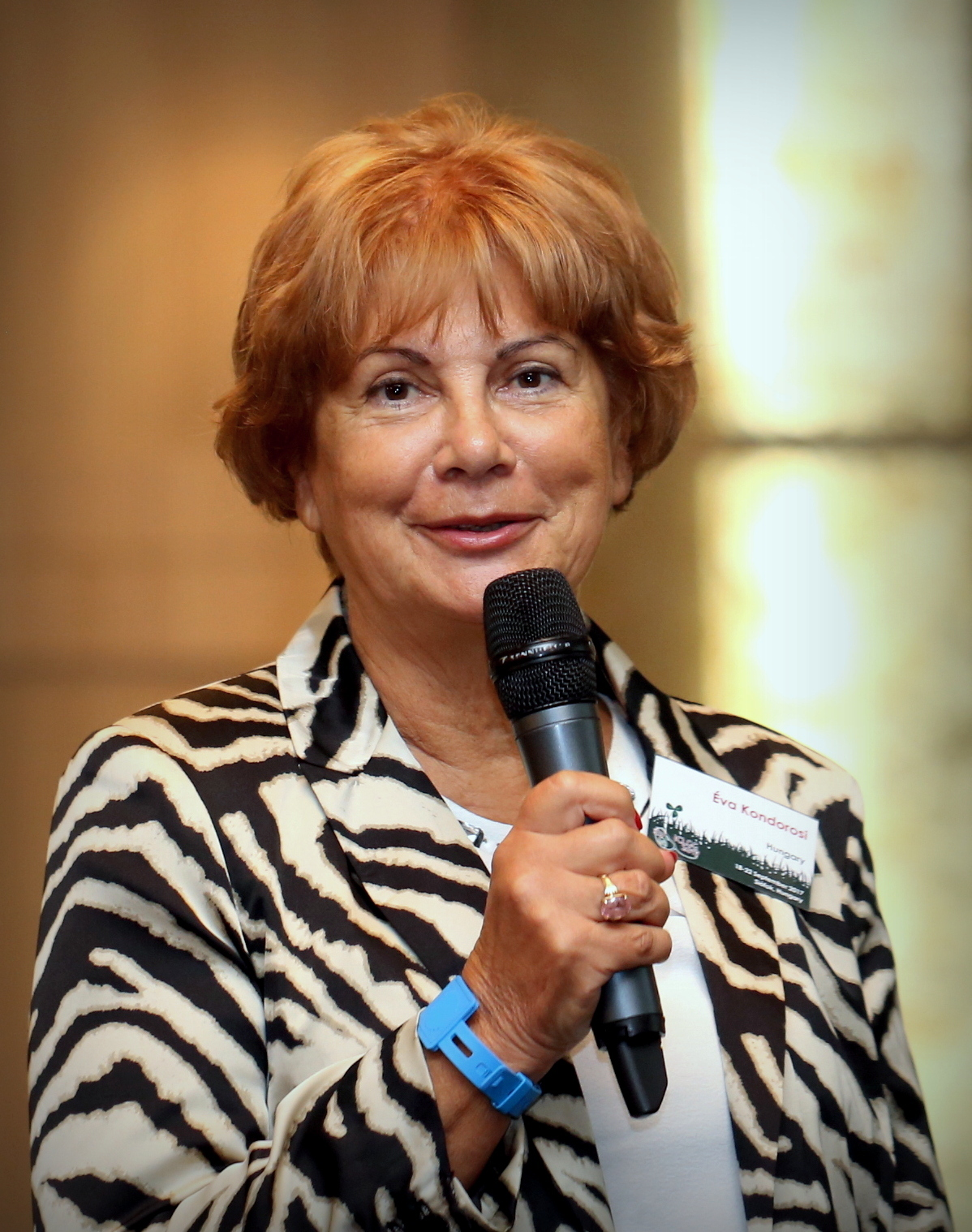
- Kondorosi in 2017
- Born: 1948 (age 77–78); Budapest, Hungary
- Education: Faculty of Sciences in Budapest; Loránd Eötvös University
- Occupations: Biochemist, researcher
- Known for: Playing a leading role in scientific collaboration between France and Hungary

Éva Kondorosi (born 1948) is a Hungarian-French biochemist who is known for her work on Rhizobium-legume symbiosis. She has been a member of the National Academy of Sciences since 2010. In 2015 she became a member of the German Academy of Sciences Leopoldina.

== Biography ==
=== Education ===
Éva Kondorosi was born in 1948 in Budapest, Hungary. She studied biology at the Faculty of Sciences in Budapest and later she earned a doctorate in genetics at the Loránd Eötvös University in Budapest.

=== Career ===
In 1973, Kondorosi joined the Biology Research Centre of the Hungarian Academy of Sciences in Szeged. As a young researcher, she continued her training and completed several internships abroad at: University of Sussex in the United Kingdom, Harvard and Cornell Universities in the United States, and the Max-Planck Society in Germany between 1973 and 1986. In 1989, she settled in France and joined the National Centre for Scientific Research (CNRS) as a research director at the Institute of Plant Sciences in Gif-sur-Yvette. Since March 2013, she has been emeritus research director of the CNRS. She obtained French nationality in 1995.

She has played a leading role in scientific collaboration between France and Hungary.

Throughout her career in France, she maintained close ties with her home institution, the Szeged laboratory. This allowed for collaboration between the Gif-sur-Yvette laboratory and the Szeged laboratory. As a result, the two institutions were twinned through the creation of the BAYGEN Institute (2007–2012), which is now an integral part of the Biology Research Center of the Hungarian Academy of Sciences in Szeged.

Currently, she works at the Biology Research Center of the Hungarian Academy of Sciences in Szeged and heads the Symbiosis Laboratory and the Functional Genomics Unit.

Kondorosi is a member and corresponding member of several academies, including the National Academy of Sciences in the United States and the Academia Europaea. She is a member of the Scientific Council, the European Research Council, and the European Molecular Biology Organization. She serves on the board of the International Society for Plant-Microbe Molecular Interactions (IS-MPMI). She helped launch UNESCO's Women in Science program and was a member of the international jury for the L'Oréal-UNESCO For Women in Science Awards.

Between 2020 and 2025, Kondorosi served as a Chief Scientific Advisor to the European Commission.

== Research ==
Kondorosi is recognized for her work in the study of Rhizobium - legume symbiosis, in particular for the discovery and characterization of a series of cysteine-rich nodule peptides that are important signaling molecules. Her research findings on cell cycle regulation during symbiosis, on the differentiation of Bacteroides, and on the production of peptides with antimicrobial activity have earned her international recognition. The plant responds to the presence of Rhizobium by creating nodules on the roots, in which the bacteria grow. The bacteria in the nodules are able to transform nitrogen from the air into a form that can be used by the plant, thus providing an essential nutrient, often scarce in the environment. Beyond the importance of its contribution to basic science, a better understanding of nitrogen fixation is crucial for food security and for reducing society's dependence on fertilizers, which are energy-intensive and whose production is a major source of greenhouse gases.

His current research focuses on the dual use of strategies used naturally by plants in agriculture and public health.

=== Personal life ===
Andor Tarnai, the late father of Éva Kondorosi, was a Hungarian writer and a literary historian. She was married to Ádám Kondorosi, a Hungarian biologist.

== Distinctions and awards ==
- 2022: Best Molecular Biology Scientists, Research.com
- 2019: Prix de la Ville de Szeged
- 2018: Balzan Prize for Chemical Ecology
- 2017: Grand prix de la Fondation Szeged
- 2012: Hungarian Széchenyi Prize for outstanding scientific contribution
- 2012: International Society for Plant-Microbe Molecular Interactions (IS-MPMI) Award
- 2011: Prix de Szeged
- 2011: Biology Research Prize
- 2007: Hotchkiss Award
- 1985: Prize of the Hungarian Academy of Sciences
