= Richard Hyman =

British industrial relations expert

- Born: 9 July 1942 (age 84); United Kingdom
- Occupations: Academic, writer

Academic background
- Education: University of Oxford

Academic work
- Institutions: London School of Economics
- Main interests: Industrial relations
- Notable works: Strikes (1972); Industrial Relations: A Marxist Introduction (1975); Concise Introduction to Employment Relations (2025)

Richard Hyman (born 9 July 1942) is a British academic in the field of industrial relations. Hyman is a Professor Emeritus at the London School of Economics and a fellow of the British Academy. A conference was held in his honour by the British Journal of Industrial Relations (BJIR) in 2009.

== Life and work ==
Hyman graduated from the University of Oxford with a bachelor's degree and a Ph.D. in 1968. His doctoral thesis on the evolution of trade unions in the United Kingdom was the basis for his 1971 book The Worker's Union. As a student of Allan Flanders and Hugh Clegg, he developed a critical perspective on the Oxford School of pluralism that they espoused, challenging the theoretical foundations within the field.

In 1968, Hyman became a Research Fellow at the [University of Warwick], and subsequently Lecturer and then [Reader (academic rank)|reader], being promoted in 1985 to professor of industrial relations . In 2000 he moved to a chair at the London School of Economics, and was made Professor Emeritus in 2009. He is the author of numerous books and essays (including Strikes and Industrial Relations: A Marxist Introduction), writing extensively on the themes of industrial relations, industrial conflict, collective bargaining, trade unionism, and labour market policy. His comparative study Understanding European Trade Unionism: Between Market, Class and Society is widely cited by scholars working in the field. He is the founder and former editor of the European Journal of Industrial Relations.

Whilst Hyman's primary impact has been on theoretical approaches to industrial relations, his influence has extended to practitioner audiences. International organisations that have sought his collaboration include the International Labour Organization in Geneva, the European Union and the European Trade Union Institute. He has given presentations to conferences and congresses organised by a wide range of European bodies, including the German Trade Union Confederation, IG Metall, the Friedrich Ebert Foundation, the General Confederation of Greek Workers and the General Confederation of Portuguese Workers.

Hyman was involved in the left-wing British student movement and now identifies as an independent leftist. In May 2009, the British Journal of Industrial Relations (BJIR) held a conference in his honour. In 2020, he was elected a Fellow of the British Academy.

== Selected writings ==
- Strikes (1972)
- Industrial Relations: A Marxist Introduction (1975)
- (Ed. with Wolfgang Streeck): New Technology and Industrial Relations (1988)
- The Political Economy of Industrial Relations (1989)
- Understanding European Trade Unionism. Between Market, Class and Society (2002)
- Trade Unions in Western Europe: Hard Times, Hard Choices (with Rebecca Gumbrell-McCormick) (2013)
- Democracy in trade unions, democracy through trade unions? (with Rebecca Gumbrell-McCormick) (2018, in: Economic and Industrial Democracy)
- Concise Introduction to Employment Relations (2025)

== Literature about Richard Hyman ==
- Symposium in Honour of Richard Hyman. In: British Journal of Industrial Relations, Vol. 49, Issue 2, June 2011, pp. 209–410
- Carola Frege, John Kelly and Patrick McGovern: Richard Hyman: Marxism, Trade Unionism and Comparative Employment Relations. In: British Journal of Industrial Relations, Vol. 49, Issue 2, June 2011, pp. 209–230
- Gregor Gall: Richard Hyman: An assessment of his Industrial Relations: A Marxist Introduction. In: Capital & Class, Vol. 36, Issue 1, February 2012, pp. 135–149
