= Eva Zažímalová =

Czech biochemist

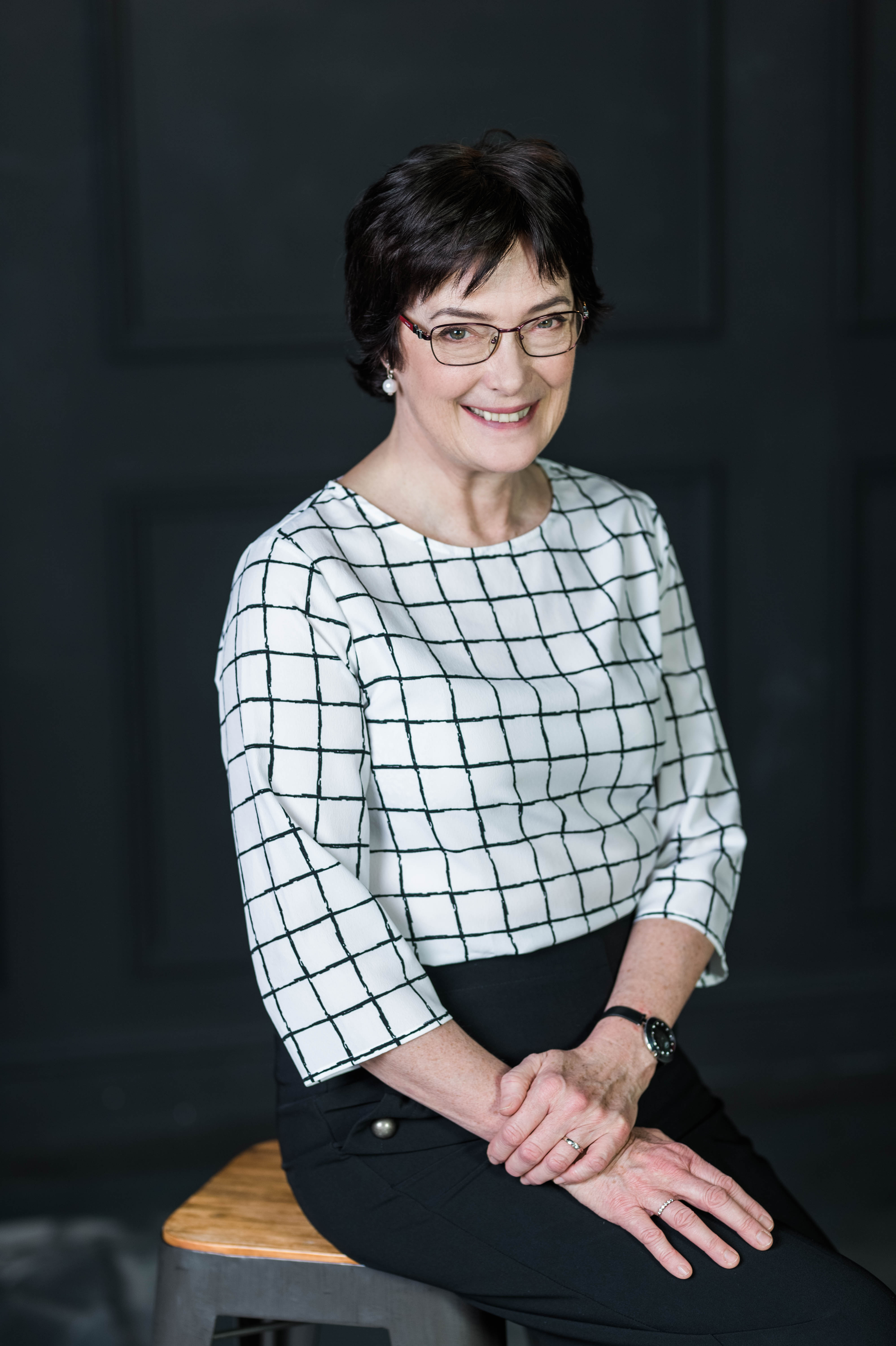

President of the Czech Academy of Sciences
- In office 25 March 2017 – 25 March 2025
- Preceded by: Jiří Drahoš
- Succeeded by: Radomír Pánek

Personal details
- Born: February 18, 1955 (age 71) Prague, Czechoslovakia (now Czech Republic)
- Citizenship: Czech
- Party: Independent
- Education: Charles University
- Occupation: biochemist

Eva Zažímalová (born 18 February 1955) is a Czech biochemist and from March 2017 to March 2025 the president of the Czech Academy of Sciences.

Between 2020 and 2025, Zažimalová served as a Chief Scientific Advisor to the European Commission.

She studied biochemistry at the Faculty of Science of Charles University in Prague in 1974–1979. Since 1983, she has worked in the Institute of Experimental Botany of the Czech Academy of Sciences. Between 2003 and 2007, she was the deputy director of this institute, from 2007 to 2012 she led the institute as its director. At Charles University, Eva Zažímalová was habilitated in 2004 and in 2013 she was appointed professor of plant anatomy and physiology. She was elected to the European Academy of Sciences and Arts, and is a member of the Academia Europaea.

She has devoted herself to the molecular mechanisms of the effect of plant hormones. Her research work is focused predominantly on the phytohormone auxin, its metabolism and the molecular mechanisms of its activity and transport in plant cells. The results of her research have found applications for instance in agriculture.
