= Kuldar Sink =

Estonian composer, flautist, and harpsichordist (1942–1995)

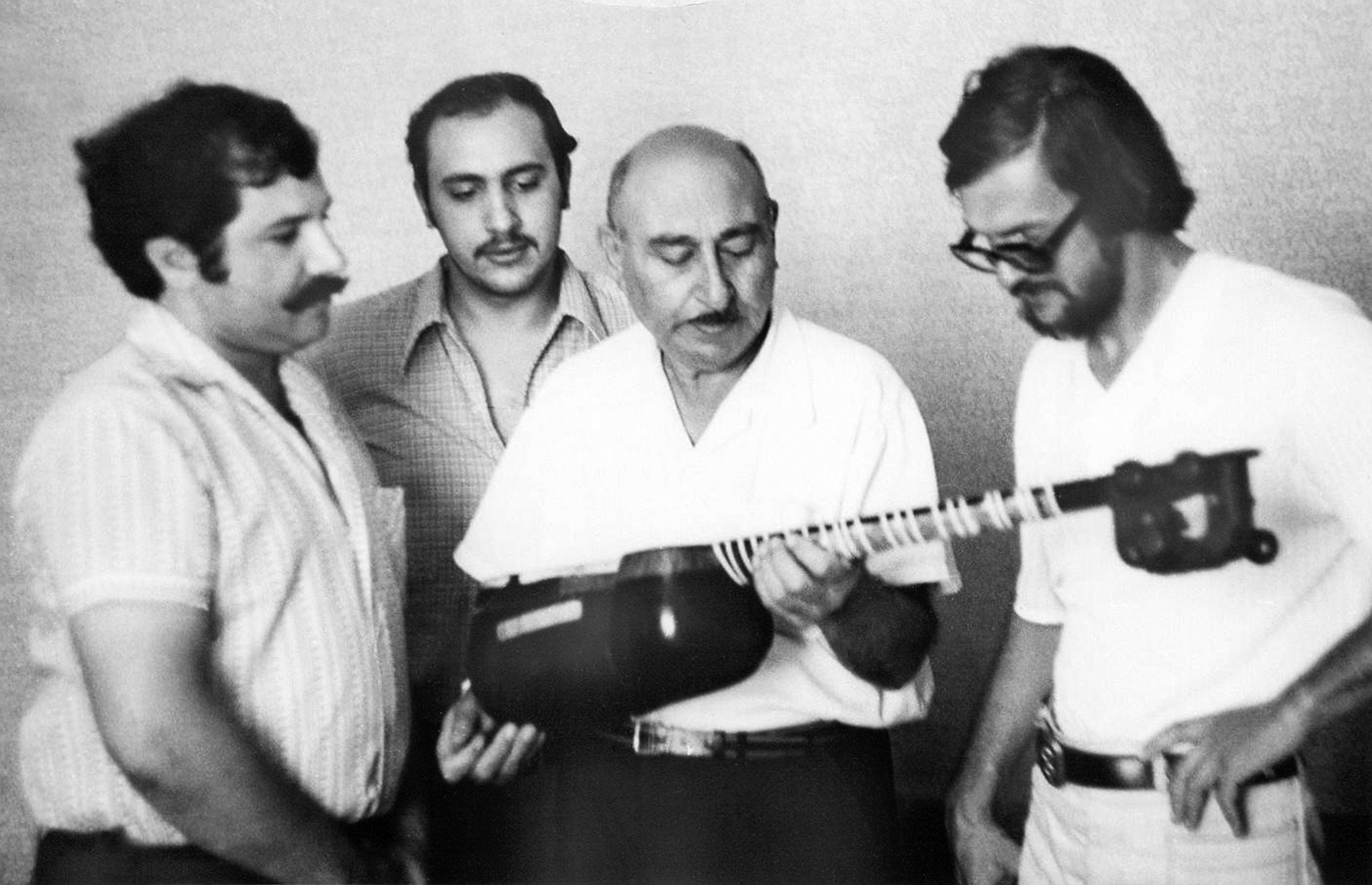
Kuldar Sink (right), Bahram Mansurov, Eldar Mansurov and Hasan Adigozalzade in Baku in 1978

Kuldar Sink (14 September 1942 in Tallinn – 29 January 1995 in Kõrve, Võru County) was an Estonian composer and flautist. While his earlier compositions were often neoclassical in style and influenced by Claude Debussy and Olivier Messiaen, the mature part of his career was devoted to musical modernism and avant-garde music. Some of the techniques he employed in his compositions included serialism, tone clusters, unified field, and aleatoric music. In the latter part of his career he began incorporating traditions from the folk music of Central Asia into his compositions, and he ended his career with a period focused on choral works inspired by Gregorian chant and Estonian folk music.

Sink trained at the Tallinn Music School where he earned diplomas in music theory (1960), flute performance (1961), and music composition (1961). At that school he was mentored by Veljo Tormis. He pursued graduate studies in music composition at the Leningrad Conservatory in the early to mid-1960s. His most highly regarded composition is the song cycle Sünni ja surma laulud (The Songs of Birth and Death), which incorporates tonal and rhythmic elements of the Arabic classical music maqām. Composed between 1985 and 1987, the cycle consists of five poems by Federico García Lorca. He died in Kõrve in 1995.

One of Sink's last compositions included a Biblical-themed opera. He was killed in a 1995 accident.

Kuldar was married to the artist Lilia Sink. Their daughter is the bioroboticist Maarja Kruusmaa. Kuldar's brother is politician Tunne Kelam.

== Bibliography ==
- Vaitmaa, Merike (2001). "Kuldar Sink". Grove Music Online. doi:10.1093/gmo/9781561592630.article.25881. (subscription required)
