= Jakob von Weizsäcker =

German economist and politician

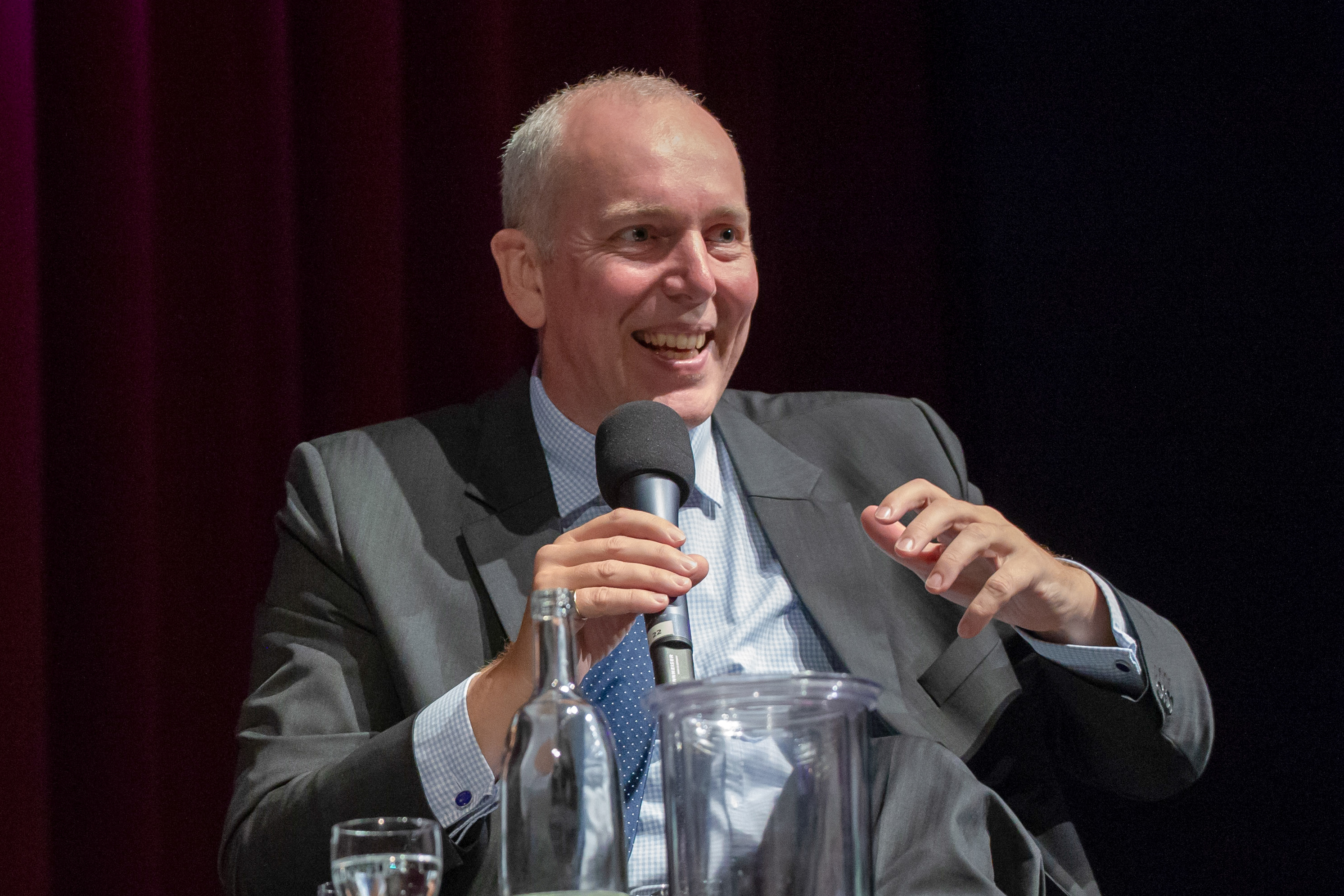

State Minister of Finance of Saarland
- Incumbent
- Assumed office 26 April 2022
- Preceded by: Peter Strobel

Member of the European Parliament
- In office 1 July 2014 – 6 January 2019
- Constituency: Germany

Personal details
- Born: 4 March 1970 (age 56) Heidelberg, West Germany
- Party: German; Social Democratic Party; EU; Party of European Socialists
- Children: 4
- Education: University of Bonn
- Website: jakob.weizsaecker.eu

Jakob Freiherr von Weizsäcker (born 4 March 1970) is a German economist and politician of the Social Democratic Party (SPD) who has been serving as State Minister of Finance in the government of Minister-President of the Saarland Anke Rehlinger since the 2022 state elections.

Weizsäcker previously served as head of the Secretariat of the G20 Joint Finance-Health Task Force on Pandemic Preparedness in 2022 and as the chief economist of the German Ministry of Finance under minister Olaf Scholz from 2019 to 2022. Before, he was a Member of the European Parliament (MEP) from Thuringia, Germany for the 8th European Parliament (2014–2019).

== Education ==
After attending Atlantic College in Wales, Weizsäcker studied at Bonn University and worked for Aktion Sühnezeichen Friedensdienste in Poland instead of military service. He completed his university studies in France at ENS Lyon and what is today known as the Paris School of Economics, graduating with a Maîtrise in physics and a Diplôme d'études approfondies in economics.

== Career ==
=== Early career ===
Weizsäcker started work as a research fellow with Jean-Charles Hourcade at CIRED in Paris and then with Hans-Werner Sinn at the Center for Economic Studies in Munich. After stints at a venture capital firm and as a visiting scholar at the MIT Department of economics, he joined the German Ministry for Economic Affairs in 2001 as private secretary to Parliamentary State Secretary Siegmar Mosdorf. From 2002 to 2005, he worked for the World Bank in Washington, D.C., and Dushanbe. In 2005-2010 he was a resident fellow of the think-tank Bruegel in Brussels. With his work on migration policy, he coined the term Blue Card for a European scheme to attract high-skilled immigrants.

From 2010 to 2014, Weizsäcker headed a department at the State Ministry of Economic Affairs in Thuringia. In 2013, he and Maximilian Steinbeis founded the Glienicker Gruppe, a group of pro-European lawyers, economists and political scientists, together with Henrik Enderlein, Marcel Fratzscher, Clemens Fuest and others.

=== Member of the European Parliament, 2014–2019 ===
In the 2014 European elections, Weizsäcker was elected to the European Parliament where he was a member of the Committee on Economic and Monetary Affairs.

Weizsäcker's legislative files included bank structural reform and too-big-to-fail rules for clearing houses (CCPs). In 2016, the parliament voted in favour of his non-binding report on the regulation of virtual currencies such as bitcoin and blockchain.

In addition to his committee assignments, Weizsäcker also was a member of the parliament's delegation for relations with India.

=== Career in government ===
In January 2019, Weizsäcker resigned from the European Parliament upon his nomination as chief economist for the German Ministry of Finance.

When Jens Weidmann announced his resignation as president of the Deutsche Bundesbank in 2021, the Financial Times mentioned Weizsäcker as one of the leading contenders to succeed him.

He served briefly as head of the Secretariat of the G20 Joint Finance-Health Task Force on Pandemic Preparedness in 2022.

On 25 April 2022 Weizsäcker became State Minister of Finance in the government of Minister-President of the Saarland Anke Rehlinger. As one of his state's representatives at the Bundesrat, he has since been serving on the Finance Committee and on the Committee on Cultural Affairs.

In the negotiations to form a Grand Coalition under the leadership of Friedrich Merz's Christian Democrats (CDU together with the Bavarian CSU) and the SPD following the 2025 German elections, von Weizsäcker was part of the SPD delegation in the working group on public finances, led by Mathias Middelberg, Florian Oßner and Dennis Rohde.

== Other activities ==
- Jacques Delors Centre at Hertie School, Member of the advisory board (since 2019)
- Business Forum of the Social Democratic Party of Germany, Member of the Political Advisory Board (since 2018)
- ECONtribute at Reinhard Selten Institute (RSI), Member of the Scientific and Policy Advisory Board
- Ifo Institute for Economic Research, Member of the Board of Trustees
- Leibniz Institute for Financial Research, Member of the Board of Trustees
- Progressives Zentrum, Member of the Circle of Friends

== Personal life ==
Weizsäcker is married, with four children. A member of the prominent Weizsäcker family, he is the son of environmentalist and politician Ernst Ulrich von Weizsäcker, grandson of the physicist and philosopher Carl Friedrich von Weizsäcker and grandnephew of former German president Richard von Weizsäcker.
