= Marcel Fratzscher =

German economist

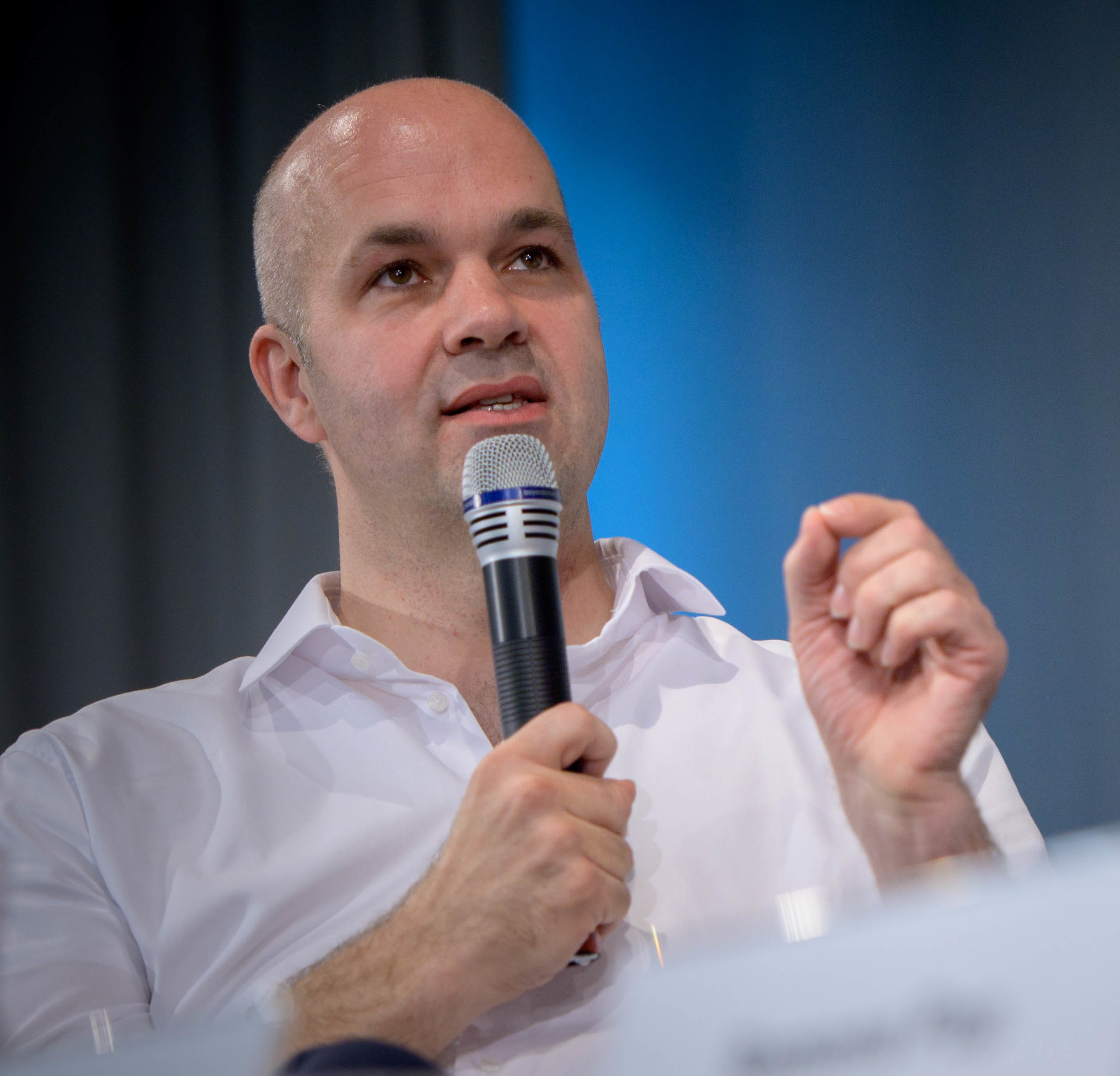
- Fratzscher in 2019
- Born: January 25, 1971 (age 55); Bonn, North Rhine-Westphalia, Germany

Academic background
- Education: Trinity College, Oxford (BA); Harvard University (MPP); European University Institute (PhD)

Academic work
- Discipline: International economics Macroeconomics
- Institutions: DIW Berlin; Humboldt-University of Berlin
- Website: Information at IDEAS / RePEc

Marcel Fratzscher (born January 25, 1971) is a German economist and professor at Humboldt-University of Berlin. Since February 2013 he has been president of the Berlin-based economic research institute DIW Berlin. He was previously head of International Policy Analysis at the European Central Bank. He also teaches International Finance in the Ph.D. programme in Economics at Goethe University Frankfurt.

== Education ==
Fratzscher passed the Vordiplom at the University of Kiel, and holds a Bachelor of Arts in Philosophy, Politics and Economics from Trinity College, Oxford, a Master of Public Policy from Harvard University's John F. Kennedy School of Government, and a Doctor of Philosophy from the European University Institute in Florence, Italy. During the 1997 Asian financial crisis, Fratzscher coincidentally worked at the Harvard Center for International Development in Jakarta, Indonesia giving him a close up view of a country affected by the crisis.

== Career ==
His field of interests include macroeconomics and monetary economics, in particular the economic effects of central bank announcements.

In 2013, Fratzscher was named member of the Scientific Advisory Board of the Federal Ministry for Economic Affairs and Technology. Later that year, he joined Henrik Enderlein, Clemens Fuest, Jakob von Weizsäcker and others in founding the Glienicker Gruppe, a group of pro-European lawyers, economists and political scientists.

Since 2018, Fratzscher has been a member of the United Nations High-Level Advisory Board on Economic and Social Affairs, convened by UN Under-Secretary-General Liu Zhenmin.

== Criticism ==
His book on inequality (Verteilungskampf: Warum Deutschland immer ungleicher wird) was based on an OECD study which claimed that inequality reduces economic growth. The study was questioned by the Cologne Institute for Economic Research.

== Other activities ==
=== Non-profit organizations ===
- Hertie School of Governance, Member of the Board of Trustees (since 2016)
- World Economic Forum (WEF), Member of the Global Agenda Council on Public Finance and Social Protection Systems
- "Deutschland rundet auf", Member of the Board of Trustees

=== Editorial boards ===
- Journal of International Economics, Associate Editor (since 2013)
- Wirtschaftsdienst, Member of the Scientific Advisory Board
- Economic Policy, Member of Economic Policy Panel (2014–2015)
