= Maarja Kruusmaa =

Estonian roboticist

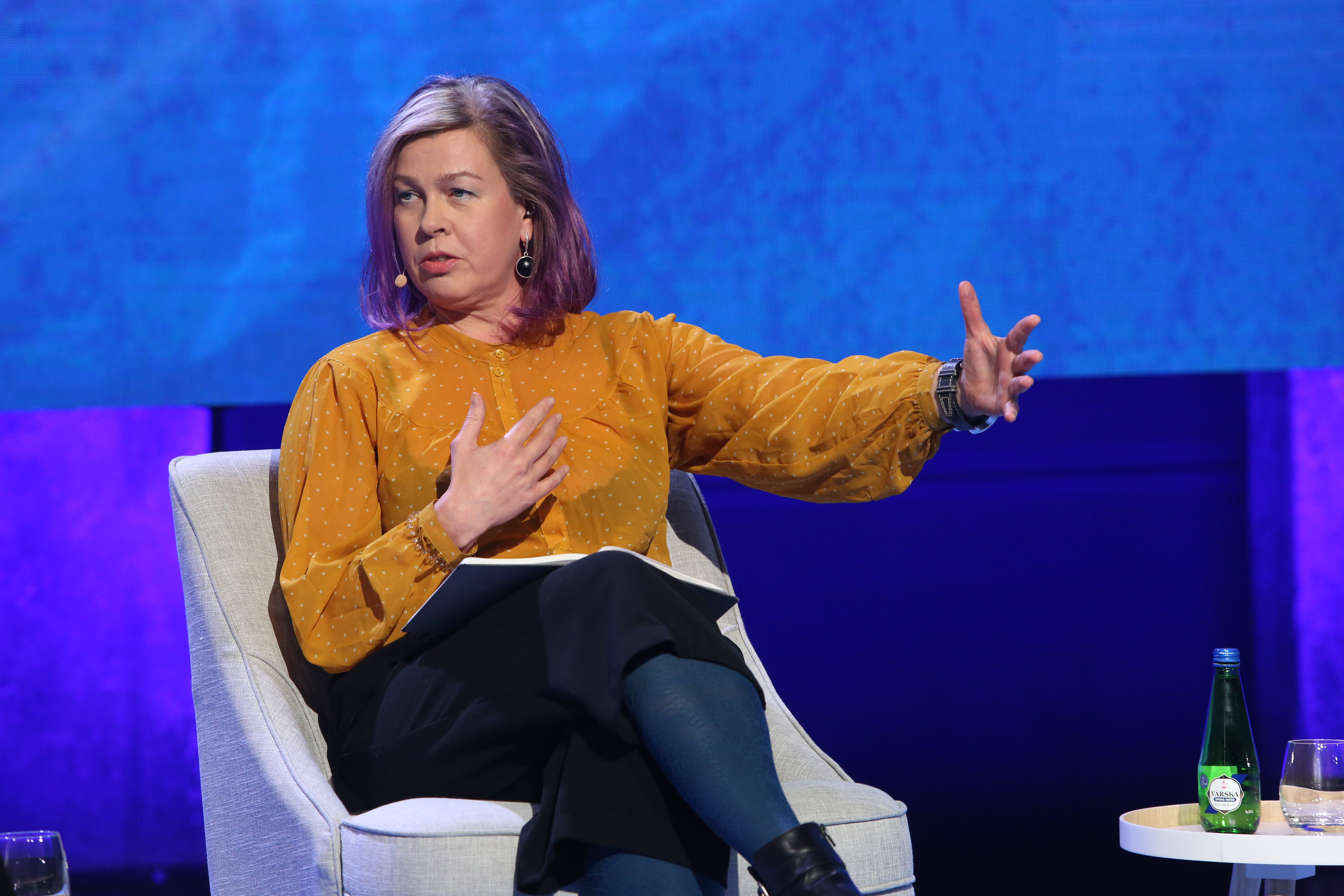
- Kruusmaa in 2020
- Born: Maarja Sink; 4 January 1970 (age 56)
- Education: Tallinn University of Technology; Chalmers University of Technology
- Occupation: Roboticist
- Known for: Underwater robotics research
- Children: Three
- Father: Kuldar Sink

Maarja Kruusmaa (maiden name Maarja Sink; born 4 January 1970) is an Estonian computer scientist, professor at Tallinn University of Technology, vice-rector for research and head of the biorobotics center at that university. Her main research area is bio-inspired underwater robotics to imitate the movements of fish and turtles.

== Life and work ==
Kruusmaa graduated from Tallinn Polytechnic in 1989 (majoring in electronic computing machines and devices) and in 1994 from Tallinn University of Technology, majoring in computers and computer networks. From 1995 to 2002, she was a doctoral student at Chalmers University of Technology in Sweden, where she defended her doctoral thesis in 2002 on "Repeated Path Planning for Mobile Robots in Dynamic Environments."

Kruusmaa worked as a senior information technology researcher at Tartu University Institute of Technology in 2004–2009 and was the co-founder and development director of Fits.me from 2009 to 2016.

She has been working at Tallinn University of Technology. There she has served as head of the biorobotics center 2008–2016 and professor 2008–2016; research vice-dean of the Faculty of Information Technology 2015–2019; Head of the Biorobotics Center of the Institute of Computer Systems; Professor of the Institute of Computer Systems since 2017; and research vice-rector from 2020.

She was elected a member of the Estonian Academy of Sciences in 2016 in the field of technical sciences. She belongs to the department of informatics and technical sciences at the academy and is a member of the board of the academy (since 2019). She is a member of the Estonian Polar Research Commission of the Academy of Sciences and the Council of Estonian Centers of Excellence in Science.

== Main research ==
Kruusmaa's main research areas are biorobotics, electroactive materials and devices and their control, underwater robotics and learning algorithms for intelligent robots. According to the Estonian Academy of Sciences,

Kruusmaa is developing underwater robots that can make their own decisions. Until now, the biggest test of underwater technology has been how to control the robots, because often neither humans nor machines can communicate with each other in the water in a normal way. Kruusmaa has proposed new movement mechanisms for robots, taking the example of the best underwater navigators in nature - fish. Based on the same source of inspiration, she has developed current-sensitive sensors and actuators that improve the robot's perception of its environment.

She is also the co-founder of the technology group fits.me and the startup firm SafeToAct which focuses on innovative solutions in medicine, such as the creation of an artificial kidney.

Between 2020 and 2025, Kruusmaa served as a Chief Scientific Advisor to the European Commission.

== Personal ==
Kruusmaa is married and has two sons and one daughter. Her mother is the painter Lilia Sink and her father was the flutist and composer Kuldar Sink.

== Honors and awards ==
- 2012 Order of the White Star, IV Class (2012)
- 2016 Research Award of the Republic of Estonia (2016)
- 2017 Friend of Science Journalism Award (2017)
- 2023 Knight of the French Order of Academic Palms (2023)
