= Janet Zollinger Giele =

American sociologist

- Born: 1934 (age 91–92); Wooster, Ohio, United States
- Education: Earlham College (BA 1956); Harvard University (PhD 1961)
- Known for: Life course approach
- Scientific career
- Fields: Sociology, Social policy, Women's studies
- Workplaces: Wellesley College; Radcliffe College; Brandeis University

Janet Zollinger Giele (born 1934) is an American sociologist and professor emerita of Sociology, Social Policy, and Women's Studies at Brandeis University. She is best known for her research on the evolving lives of women, from the 19th century women's rights movements to women's contemporary work and family roles. In addition, her publications include the methodology of life course research and the history and growth of American family policy.

== Biography ==
Giele grew up in Wooster, Ohio and graduated from Wooster High School in 1952. She earned her BA from Earlham College in 1956 as First Honor Student (valedictorian). During her junior year, 1954–1955, she studied in Paris with a Barrett Scholarship from Earlham College and received a Certificat from L'Institut d'Etudes Politiques. Her 1961 PhD in sociology from Radcliffe College (of Harvard University) examined changes in the feminine role by comparing temperance and suffrage women's lives and ideology. This work was later published as Two Paths to Women's Equality.

== Academic work ==
From 1962 to 1970, Giele taught sociology at Wellesley College. In 1970 she became a fellow of the Bunting Institute at Radcliffe College. As a Senior Fellow at the institute from 1972 to 1975, she served as Principal Consultant to the Ford Foundation's Task Force on Rights and Responsibilities of Women. Her first two books were the result of this work. Women: Roles and Status in Eight Countries, which she co-edited, uses a framework that she devised to analyze the status of women in six dimensions: family formation, duration, and size; education; employment; family planning and health; political expression; and cultural expression. She found that the status of women is closer to that of men when social organization is very simple or highly complex. In peasant societies, the status of women is reduced relative to that of men and rises again with modernization. A review in Contemporary Sociology criticizes the book for not adequately explaining why women's status improves, either with further modernization, or in revolutionary societies that are not very complex. According to the reviewer the book should have given more weight to the role of women in reproduction and to Marxist feminist theorists linking class and sex discrimination. The same reviewer praises the book as a valuable and high quality comparative study suitable for readings in women studies.

Giele's work on the changing lives of women led her to the field of life course research. In Methods of Life Course Research (1998) she collaborated with her co-editor Glen H. Elder to articulate a theory of life course development. She also reported findings from her 1980s study of women graduates of Oberlin, Spelman, and Wellesley Colleges. In The Craft of Life Course Research (2009) she demonstrates how four key background factors (identity, social networks, personal drive, and adaptive style) differ in white and African-American college-educated women who become either full-time homemakers, or who combine family and career.

In 2003, Giele coauthored the book Women and Equality in the Workplace: A Reference Handbook, described by one reviewer as "an authoritative reference work ... for any serious collection where questions of women's equality in the workplace need to be answered." Giele's interest in changing roles of women led to her work on the growth of family policy. In 1974 her exploratory research was funded by the National Science Foundation. Between 1976 and 2004 she taught a graduate level course on Family and Children's Policy at the Heller School for Social Policy at Brandeis University and was the founding director of its Family and Children's Policy Center. Her many years of linking sociological insights to pressing policy concerns such as child poverty, disability, work-life balance, and elder care led to her massive overview of social policy that appears in Family Policy and the American Safety Net. This work provides a theoretical and historical framework that shows how all social policy is ultimately family policy. From Medicare to Social Security to home mortgage regulations to immigration reform, major social programs are in the last analysis meant to promote individual well-being and the common good by helping families to carry out their basic functions of caregiving, income provision, shelter, and transmission of citizenship.

== Honors and awards ==
She has received fellowships from the Woodrow Wilson, Ford, and Rockefeller Foundations, the German Marshall Fund, and the Radcliffe Institute for Advanced Study. Radcliffe College made her an honorary member of Phi Beta Kappa. Her research has been supported by the National Institutes of Mental Health, the Lilly Endowment, the National Institute on Aging, and the Rockefeller Foundation. Earlham College gave her its Outstanding Alumni Award and Radcliffe its Graduate Society Medal, honoring women who have earned a Radcliffe or Harvard Graduate degree and have made an outstanding contribution to their field. In 2004 the Heller School recognized her teaching of doctoral students with its first Mentoring Award. In 2013, Pepperdine University established the Janet Zollinger Giele Distinguished Life Course Award to recognize women who have overcome significant obstacles to become leaders in their chosen field.

== Personal life and community service ==
Giele is married to David L. Giele and has two children. She has served as a lay leader in her church, as a member of Wellesley Town Meeting, an alumni trustee of Earlham College, and Acting Dean of the Heller School. From 2009 to 2012 she was the founding president of Wellesley Neighbors, a membership organization that is part of the national village movement which helps midlife and older adults continue to live independently.

== Works ==
=== Books ===
- Giele, J. Z.; Smock, A. C., eds. (1977). Women: Roles and Status in Eight Countries. New York: Wiley. ISBN 978-0-471-01504-8.
- Giele, J. Z. (1978). Women and the Future: Changing Sex Roles in Modern America. New York: Free Press. ISBN 978-0-02-911700-2.
- Giele, J. Z., ed. (1982). Women in the Middle Years: Current Knowledge and Directions for Research and Policy. Wiley series on personality processes. New York: Wiley.
- Kahne, H.; Giele, J. Z., eds. (1992). Women's Work and Women's Lives: The Continuing Struggle Worldwide. Boulder, Colorado: Westview Press. ISBN 978-0-8133-0636-0.
- Giele, Janet Zollinger (1995). Two Paths to Women's Equality: Temperance, Suffrage, and the Origins of American Feminism. Social movements past and present. New York: Twayne Publishers.
- Giele, J. Z.; Elder, G. H. Jr., eds. (1998). Methods of Life Course Research: Qualitative and Quantitative Approaches. Thousand Oaks, California: Sage Publications.
- Giele, J. Z.; Stebbins, Leslie (2003). Women and Equality in the Workplace. Contemporary world issues. Santa Barbara, California: ABC-Clio Press.
- Giele, J. Z.; Holst, Elke, eds. (2004). Changing Life Patterns in Western Industrial Societies. Advances in life course research. Vol. 8. London: Elsevier Science.
- Elder, G. H. Jr.; Giele, J. Z., eds. (2009). The Craft of Life Course Research. New York: Guilford Press.
- Giele, Janet Zollinger (2013). Family Policy and the American Safety Net. Contemporary family perspectives. Thousand Oaks, California: Sage Publications.
