= Journal of Population Economics =

- Discipline: Population economics
- Language: English
- Edited by: Klaus F. Zimmermann

Publication details
- History: 1988-present
- Publisher: Springer Science+Business Media on behalf of POP at UNU-MERIT and the Global Labor Organization
- Frequency: Quarterly
- Open access: Hybrid
- Impact factor: 1.470 (2013)

Standard abbreviations
- ISO 4: J. Popul. Econ.

Indexing
- CODEN: JPECEW
- ISSN: 0933-1433 (print); 1432-1475 (web)
- LCCN: 91658531
- JSTOR: 09331433
- OCLC no.: 729540780

Links
- Journal homepage; Online access; Journal page at publisher's website

The Journal of Population Economics is a quarterly peer-reviewed academic journal that covers research on economic and demographic problems. It is published by Springer Science+Business Media in collaboration with POP at UNU-MERIT and the Global Labor Organization. It was established in 1987 by Klaus F. Zimmermann (UNU-MERIT), who remains the editor-in-chief.

== Abstracting and indexing ==
The journal is abstracted and indexed in the Social Sciences Citation Index, Scopus, EconLit, CAB International, CAB Abstracts, and the International Bibliography of the Social Sciences. According to the Journal Citation Reports, the journal has a 2013 impact factor of 1.470. As of August 2013, the journal was ranked by h-index 74th out of 2,153 economics journals listed in RePEc.

== Kuznets Prize ==
Since 1995, the journal awards the "Kuznets Prize", named after the 1971 Nobel Prize laureate Simon Kuznets, a pioneer in populations economics, for the best article published in the journal. The editors judge the best papers, originally for a three-year period and since 2014 annually.

== See also ==
- Demography
