= Equality, Diversity and Inclusion =

- Discipline: Sociology, psychology, political science
- Language: English
- Edited by: Eddy Ng

Publication details
- Former name: Equal Opportunities International
- History: 1981–present
- Publisher: Emerald Group Publishing (United Kingdom)
- Frequency: 8/year

Standard abbreviations
- ISO 4: Equal. Divers. Incl.

Indexing
- Equal Opportunities International
- ISSN: 0261-0159
- Equality, Diversity and Inclusion
- ISSN: 2040-7149

Links
- Journal homepage; Online access

Equality, Diversity and Inclusion: An International Journal is a peer-reviewed academic journal publishing research on 'equality, diversity, and inclusion' (EDI), also called 'diversity, equity, and inclusion' (DEI), an organizational frameworks which seek to promote "the fair treatment and full participation of all people", particularly groups "who have historically been underrepresented or subject to discrimination" on the basis of identity or disability. The journal published articles about racial, sexual, religious, disability, and age discrimination; equal opportunities; and affirmative action.

== Scope ==
EDI is published 8 times a year. This generally consists of regular issues and special issues. The journal aims to bring to the forefront issues surrounding equal opportunities in the general Human Resource Management field of study and in academic practical applications. Duke Harrison-Hunter.

== History ==
Equality, Diversity and Inclusion (EDI) is currently published by Emerald Group Publishing (since 2006). EDI was established in 1981 under the name Equal Opportunities International (EOI), and was changed to EDI in 2010. The editor-in-chief is Eddy Ng, who, in 2016, succeeded Regine Bendl (Vienna University of Economics and Business) (2010-2016), and Mustafa F. Özbilgin (Brunel Business School, Brunel University) (2006-2010).

The journal organizes an annual conference, the Equality, Diversity and Inclusion conference (formerly the Equal Opportunities International conference).

== Editorial approach ==
The journal accepts submissions for articles that are aligned with the overall aim of promoting awareness and exploration of concepts related to, but not limited to, diversity, inequalities, inclusion, discrimination, and equal opportunity. Authors may submit papers for regular issues that are aligned with the scope of the journal.

Special Issues are led by guest editors who are eminent experts on a particular topic.

== Leading articles and ideas ==
Some examples of articles and ideas covered in the journal are women in STEM; growing diversity in across organizations and societies; inclusive workplace behavior; institutional racism; and influences of ethnicity, gender, and immigration status.

== Readership ==
EDI is read and used as a tool by those in higher education who teach management courses. It is also a useful tool for those in the human resource and management fields in the corporate sector.

== Abstracting and indexing ==
ABI/Inform ProQuest, British Library Direct, Business Source Alumni Edition/Complete/Government Edition/Corporate Plus/Elite/Premier, CSA Worldwide Political Science Abstracts, EBSCO Host, Educational Management Abstracts, Emerald Full Text, Emerging Sources Citation Index, FRANCIS (International Humanities and Social Sciences), Informatics J-Gate, Ingenta Connect, International Abstracts of Human Resources, IBSS (International Bibliography of the Social Sciences), Multicultural Management Abstracts, OCLC Online First Search, ReadCube Discovery, Sociological Abstracts, Sociology of Education Abstracts, Studies on Women and Gender Abstracts, SwetsWise, TOC Premier (EBSCO), Ulrich's Reference Source

== See also ==
- Environmental, social, and corporate governance
- Diversity, equity, and inclusion
