= Pearl Dykstra =

Dutch social scientist

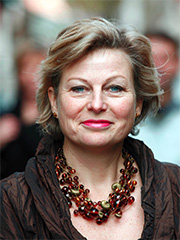
- Born: December 14, 1956 (age 69); Sarnia, Ontario, Canada
- Education: University of Toronto
- Scientific career
- Fields: Social science

Pearl A. Dykstra is a Dutch social scientist with a background in sociology, psychology, gerontology and demography. She is a specialist on intergenerational solidarity, aging societies, family change, aging and the life course, and loneliness.

She holds the position of Professor of Empirical Sociology at the Erasmus University Rotterdam, the Netherlands. She was the Deputy Chair (2016-2020) of the High Level Group of scientists advising the Cabinet of European Commissioners. She is a member of the Board of the Social Sciences and Humanities Division of the Netherlands Organization for Scientific Research. She is also an elected member of the Royal Netherlands Academy of Arts and Sciences, being chosen in 2004. She serves as Scientific Director of ODISSEI, the Open Data Infrastructure for Social Science and Economics Innovations.

== Biography ==
Dykstra graduated from the Vrije Universiteit Amsterdam with a BA degree in psychology in 1979. She completed her MA degree in psychology in 1982 at the University of Toronto. She received her doctoraal (graduate level, social psychology), from the Vrije Universiteit Amsterdam in 1985. She completed her training at the Vrije Universiteit Amsterdam, where she obtained her Ph.D. in Social psychology in 1990. The title of her dissertation was: Next of (non)kin: The importance of primary relationships for older adults' well-being.

After obtaining her PhD, Dykstra worked as a senior scientist at the Netherlands Interdisciplinary Demographic Institute (NIDI), in The Hague. In 2000, while working at the NIDI, she also became a lecturer in Sociology and Social Gerontology at the Vrije Universiteit Amsterdam. In the same year, she became the director of the Netherlands Kinship Panel Study. From 2002-2009 she held the position of Professor in Kinship demography at Utrecht University. Pearl Dykstra was appointed chair of Empirical Sociology at Erasmus University Rotterdam in 2009, and held her inaugural speech in 2012.

Dykstra is a consortium member of the Generations and Gender Programme (GGP), which is on the Netherlands Organization for Scientific Research (NWO)'s National Roadmap for Large-Scale Research Facilities.

She served as Vice-President of the Royal Netherlands Academy of Arts and Sciences (KNAW) from 2011-2016. She is an elected member of the Royal Holland Society of Sciences and Humanities (KHMW) since 2005. She was an elected member of the Dutch Social Sciences Council (SWR) from 2006-2016. In 2009 she was a Fellow of the Netherlands Institute for Advanced Study in the Humanities and Social Studies (NIAS). In 2010 she was elected as fellow of the Gerontological Society of America, and in 2016 she was elected as member of Academia Europaea, the pan-European Academy of Humanities, Letters, Law, and Sciences. In 2018, she was elected Member of the Governing Board of the International Science Council

Dykstra's research has been supported by numerous grants from the Netherlands Organization for Scientific Research and the European Research Council. She acquired funding for a number of large-scale projects, such as the Netherlands Kinship Panel Study (NWO Large Investments 2002-2014), EU 7th framework programs MULTILINKS (2008-2011), Changing Families and Sustainable Societies (2013-2017), and Families In Context (ERC-Advanced Grant 2012).

== Research ==
(1) Multidimensional approach.

Dykstra's research is among the first to recognize the complexity in adult parent-child relationships, as reflected in configurations of support and conflicting emotions. In joint collaborations, she has developed a typological approach to obtain a nuanced picture of the way generational dependencies arise within families. Such an approach does not assume that dimensions such as exchanges of support, conflicts and emotions are additive or can be traced back to a single construct. Van Gaalen and Dykstra (2006), for example, reveal that - contrary to the usual view that solidarity and conflict are opposites - conflicts sometimes go hand in hand with intense exchanges of material support ('ambivalent relationships'), and in other cases go hand in hand with an absence of meaningful interactions ('discordant relationships').

(2) Focus on young and old.

In research and policy circles, issues concerning young and old are usually studied and discussed separately from each other. In her work, Dykstra has shown the importance of moving beyond this distinction, as it not only ignores similarities between young and old but also ignores intergenerational dependencies. Her approach, which takes into account several family generations, has generated new research questions, such as those about the role of grandparenthood in retirement decisions and the availability of help from grandparents in decisions about children (Dykstra & Komter, 2012).

(3) Focus on exceptions.

Dykstra underlines the importance of research into groups that go beyond the beaten track, such as the never-married and childless. Attention for people for whom there is no ready-made 'life script', offers convincing insights into the ways in which families shape people's lives and therefore also offers insights into the social organization of society. Dykstra has made significant contributions to the literature on the structuring role of parenthood: at the macro level of legislation (rights and duties of parents, parenting as a basis for financial benefits), the meso level of networks, neighborhoods, and civil society (parenting as a route to social integration and as a mechanism of social control) and the micro level of individual lives (parenting as a restriction and as a transforming event).

(4) Focus on how policies shape inequality.

A recurring theme in Dykstra's research is that legal regulations and policy provisions around families are not neutral. They create dependencies that restrict people's autonomy, can facilitate the choice to enter into intergenerational obligations, but can also promote economic independence through participation in the labor market. International comparative research (Hagestad & Dykstra, 2016; Dykstra, 2018) shows that women rather than men opt for financial compensation, just as women with few professional perspectives make that choice sooner than women with broad professional perspectives.

(5) Create an open data infrastructure.

Dykstra is the scientific director of ODISSEI.: Open Data Infrastructure for Social Science and Economic Innovations. ODISSEI works to develop a sustainable research infrastructure for the social sciences in the Netherlands. Through ODISSEI, researchers within the social sciences have access to large-scale, longitudinal data collections connected to registrations from Statistics Netherlands (CBS). This virtual web enables researchers to answer new, cross-disciplinary research questions and to investigate existing questions in new ways

== Representative publications ==
- Van den Broek, T., Dykstra, P. A., & Van der Veen, R. J. (2019). Adult children stepping in? Long-term care reforms and trends in children's provision of household support to impaired parents in the Netherlands. Ageing & Society,39(1), 112-137.
- Dykstra, P. A. (2018). Cross-national perspectives on intergenerational family relations: The influence of public policy arrangements. Innovation in Aging, 2(1).
- Hagestad, G. O., & Dykstra, P. A. (2016). Structuration of the life course: Some neglected aspects. In M. J. Shanahan J. T. Mortimer, & M. Kirkpatrick Johnson (Eds.), Handbook of the life course, Volume II (pp. 131–157). New York: Springer.
- Dykstra, P. A., & Komter, A. E. (2012). Generational interdependencies in families: The MULTILINKS research programme. Demographic Research, 27(18), 487-506.
- Dykstra, P. A., & Fokkema, T. (2011). Relationships between parents and their adult children: A West European typology of late-life families. Ageing & Society, 31(4), 545-569.
- Dykstra, P. A., & Poortman, A.-R. (2010). Economic resources and remaining single: Trends over time. European Sociological Review, 26, 277-290.
- Dykstra, P. A. (2009). Older adult loneliness: Myths and realities. European Journal of Aging, 6 (2), 91-100. [Reprinted in: Vézina, J., Cappeliez, P., & Landreville, P. (2013). Psychologie gérontologique, 3e edition.]
- Mandemakers, J. J., & Dykstra, P. A. (2008). Discrepancies in parent's and adult child's reports of support and contact. Journal of Marriage and Family, 70 (2), 495-506.
- Van Gaalen, R. I., & Dykstra, P. A. (2006). Solidarity and conflict between adult children and parents: A latent class analysis. Journal of Marriage and Family, 68, 947-960.
- Dykstra, P. A., Van Tilburg, T. G. & De Jong Gierveld, J. (2005). Changes in older adult loneliness: Results from a seven-year longitudinal study. Research on Aging, 27, 725-747.
