= European Journal of Industrial Relations =

- Discipline: Industrial relations
- Language: English
- Edited by: Richard Hyman

Publication details
- History: 1995-present
- Publisher: SAGE Publications
- Frequency: Quarterly
- Impact factor: 0.822 (2013)

Standard abbreviations
- ISO 4: Eur. J. Ind. Relat.

Indexing
- CODEN: EJIRFZ
- ISSN: 0959-6801 (print); 1461-7129 (web)
- OCLC no.: 34059411

Links
- Journal homepage; Online access; Online archive

European Journal of Industrial Relations is a quarterly peer-reviewed academic journal that covers European industrial relations and their theoretical and practical implications. The journal was established in 1995 and is published by SAGE Publications. It was edited for the first 25 years by Richard Hyman. The current editor-in-chief is Guglielmo Meardi (Scuola Normale Superiore).

== Abstracting and indexing ==
The journal is abstracted and indexed in Scopus and the Social Sciences Citation Index. According to the Journal Citation Reports, its 2019 impact factor is 1.347, ranking it 14th out of 27 journals in the category "Industrial Relations & Labor".
