= Kõrve, Võru County =

Village in Estonia

Kõrve
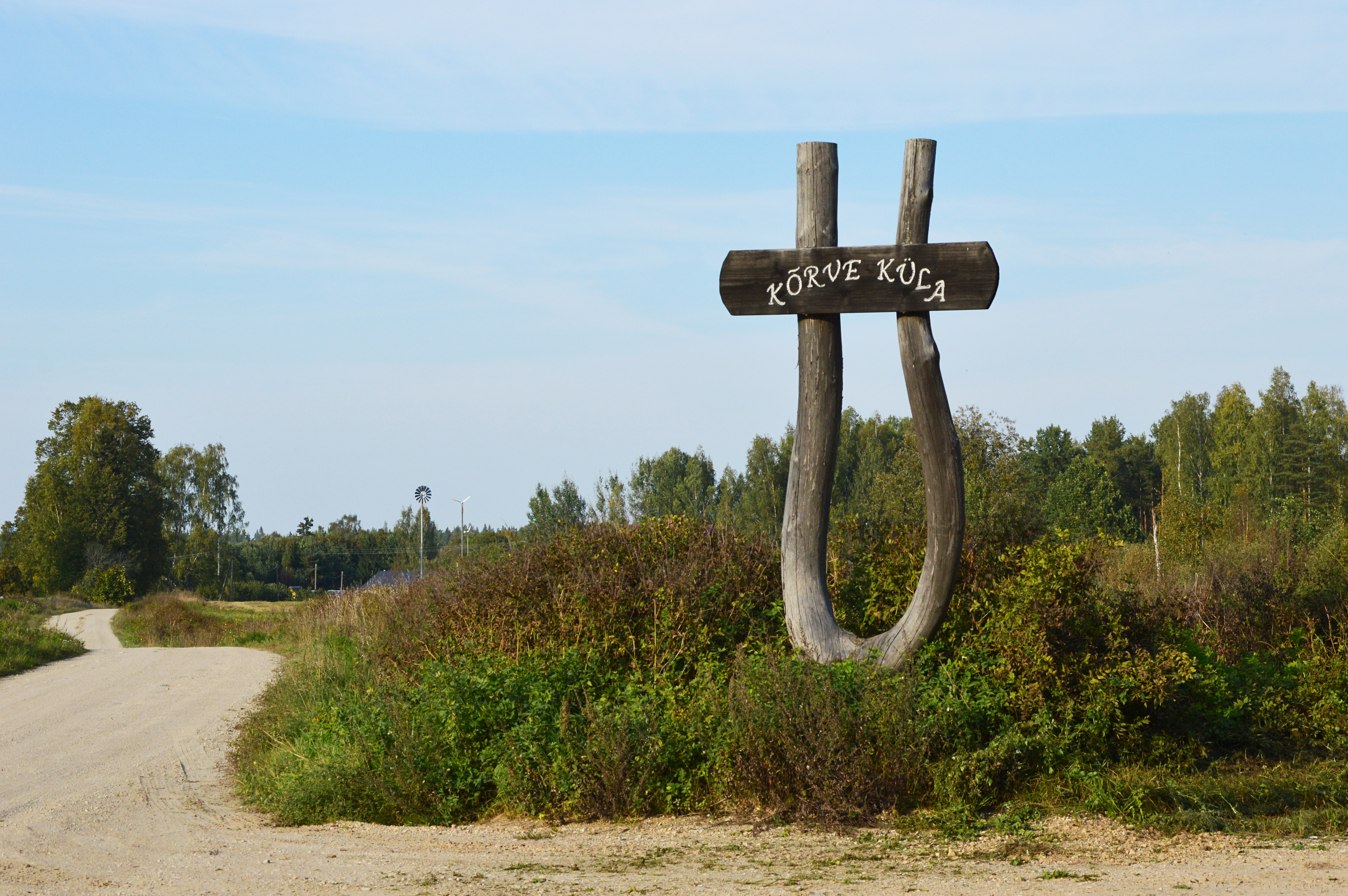

- Location within Estonia
- Coordinates: 57°46′37″N 27°20′48″E
- Country: Estonia
- County: Võru County
- Municipality: Võru Parish

Population
  - Total: 21

Kõrve is a village in Estonia, in Võru Parish, which belongs to Võru County.
