= Economics of Transition =

- Discipline: Economics
- Language: English

Publication details
- History: 1993-present
- Publisher: Wiley-Blackwell on behalf of the European Bank for Reconstruction and Development
- Frequency: Quarterly
- Impact factor: 0.679 (2011)

Standard abbreviations
- ISO 4: Econ. Transit.

Indexing
- ISSN: 0967-0750 (print); 1468-0351 (web)
- OCLC no.: 29189453

Links
- Journal homepage; Online access

Economics of Transition is a quarterly peer-reviewed academic journal published by Wiley-Blackwell on behalf of the European Bank for Reconstruction and Development. The journal was established in 1993. The journal publishes articles on the economics of structural transformation, institutional development and growth. Economics of Transition publishes full-length articles as well as symposia (collections of articles on a more narrowly defined topic) and book reviews.

According to the Journal Citation Reports, the journal has a 2011 impact factor of 0.679, ranking it 177th out of 321 journals in the category "Economics".
