= Janusz Bujnicki =

Polish biologist

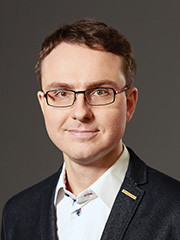
Janusz Bujnicki

Janusz Marek Bujnicki (Polish pronunciation: [ˈja.nuʂ ma.rɛk bujˈɲit͡s.ki]; born 1975) is a Polish biologist specializing in experimental and computational structural biology, professor of biological sciences, head of the Laboratory of Bioinformatics and Protein Engineering at the International Institute of Molecular and Cell Biology in Warsaw.

== Biography ==
In 1998 he graduated from the Faculty of Biology of the University of Warsaw, where in 2001 he obtained a doctorate in biological sciences. In the years 1998–2000 he completed an internship at Henry Ford Hospital in Detroit in the US, and in 2001 at the National Center for Biotechnology Information (NCBI) of the American National Institutes of Health (NIH) at Bethesda. In 2008 he was a visiting professor at the University of Tokyo.

He started work at the International Institute of Molecular and Cell Biology in Warsaw in 1999, in 2002 he took over the management of the Laboratory of Bioinformatics and Protein Engineering. Between 2004 and 2020 he has also been working at the Laboratory of Bioinformatics at the Institute of Molecular Biology and Biotechnology of the Faculty of Biology at Adam Mickiewicz University, since 2006 the group leader.

In 2005 he obtained habilitation at the Institute of Biochemistry and Biophysics of the Polish Academy of Sciences in the field of biology. In 2009 he was awarded the title of professor of biological sciences.

He was involved in the social movement "Citizens of Science", among others as the author of the "More Good Science" initiative, and as an organizer of conferences and workshops.

== Scientific achievements ==
Janusz Bujnicki currently specializes in structural biology, with a focus on RNA, and with tools of molecular biology and bioinformatics; his previous research also involved genomics and microbiology.

The teams he conducts deal with the study of the relationship between the sequence, structure and function of RNA and proteins, and the study of interactions between these molecules. The research combines computational and experimental methods. In particular, Bujnicki's group develops bioinformatics software for the prediction and modeling of the three-dimensional structure and dynamics of RNA and protein molecules, and their interactions with each other and with small chemical molecules. He is the author of over 300 original works in scientific journals, over 20 review articles and chapters in books.

== Membership ==
- member of the EMBO Policy Advisory Board (2024-)
- member of Academia Europaea
- member of the European Molecular Biology Organization
- correspondent member of the Polish Academy of Sciences
- member of the Advisory panel to the President of the Polish Academy of Sciences for the evaluation of the quality of scientific activity (2024-)
- member of the Scientific Advisory Board at the Life Science Center, Vilnius University (2023-)
- scientific advisor at the Łukasiewicz Research Network – PORT Polish Center for Technology Development, Wrocław, Poland (2019-)
- member of the University Council at the University of Warsaw (was a chairman 2019–2020)
- member of the International Scientific Council at the International Centre for Research on Innovative Bio-based Materials (ICRI-BioM), Łódź, Poland (2018-)
- founding member and a board member of the Association of ERC Grantees, AERG
- member of the European Science Advisors Forum (representative of Poland since 2017)
- former member of the European Commission's Group of Chief Scientific Advisors
- former member of the Academy of Young Scientists PAS
- former member of the Evolutionary and Theoretical Biology Committee of the Polish Academy of Sciences and the Committee of Biochemistry and Biophysics PAS
- founding member and vice president (2008–2010) and president (2011–2013) of the Polish Bioinformatics Society
- former member of the Life, Environmental and Geo Sciences (LEGS) scientific committee at Science Europe
- former member of the scientific committee of the initiative Innovative Medicines Initiative

== Decorations and distinctions ==
Laureate of the Young Scientist Program of the European Organization of Molecular Biology (EMBO) and the American Medical Institute Howard Hughes (HHM) in 2002. The first Polish laureate of the grant in the field of biological sciences awarded by the European Research Council (ERC) in 2010. In 2013, he won the plebiscite "Poles with Verve" in the Science category. Winner of the National Center for Science Award in 2014. In 2019 was awarded the André Mischke Prize for Science and Policy by the Young Academy of Europe.

In 2014 he was awarded the Knight's Cross of the Order of Polonia Restituta by President Bronisław Komorowski.
