= Foundation for Family Businesses =

German think tank and research organisation

- Stiftung Familienunternehmen (Die Stiftung für Familienunternehmen in Deutschland und Europa)
- Established: 2002; 24 years ago
- Founder: Brun-Hagen Hennerkes
- Type: non-profit
- Legal status: private foundation
- Purpose: research promotion and representation of interests
- Locations: Munich, Germany; Berlin, Germany
- Region served: Germany
- Key people: Rainer Kirchdörfer; Ulrich Stoll; Stefan Heidbreder
- Affiliations: Association of German Foundations
- Website: familienunternehmen.de

The Foundation for Family Businesses (Die Stiftung für Familienunternehmen in Deutschland und Europa) is a non-profit foundation headquartered in Munich, Germany. It has a representative office in Berlin near the Reichstag building. Ever since the foundation was established in 2002, it has been committed to representing the interest of large family businesses (meaning companies that are primarily impacted by one family or a family collective.) Thus, it promotes academic research focusing on family businesses, in addition to holding events.

== History ==
Brun-Hagen Hennerkes founded the Foundation for Family Businesses in 2002. The goal was to provide the interests of such companies with an institutional framework. According to Hennerkes, these had not been adequately addressed thus far.

The foundation's first projects included a series of events that identified the handing over the reins to a new generation as a structural problem for family-managed companies. The foundation commissioned the Zentrum für Europäische Wirtschaftsforschung Mannheim and Institut für Mittelstandsforschung Bonn with the first study to assess Germany's overall competitiveness as a business location.

Throughout the years, the foundation's activities have focused on proposals for taxing family businesses. Against the backdrop of the debate surrounding the reform of corporate taxation, the Foundation advocated the relief of business assets in the context of inheritance tax, and rejected the possible reintroduction of a wealth tax. It addressed other issues such as return on investment and equity ratio of listed family companies and the influence of founder companies. In 2012, the foundation opened the "House of Family Businesses," (Haus des Familienunternehmens) at Pariser Platz in Berlin-Mitte to encourage the dialogue between political representatives and the public.

In June 2021, the Foundation for Family Businesses announced the creation of the “Foundation for Family Businesses and Politics”. This foundation is not a charitable organisation and acts as a lobbying group under the foundation’s articles of association. It is based in the “House of Family Businesses” in Berlin. In future, the “Foundation for Family Businesses and Politics” plans to take part in such activities as testifying at hearings of experts held in the German Parliament. The new foundation was registered with the German Parliament as an interest group. The “Foundation for Family Businesses and Politics” opened an office in Brussels in 2022. It now employs six individuals (as of February 2023). The chairs of both foundations are identical.

== Activities ==
The foundation maintains contact with business, science, politics, and media representatives, for example, at events and congresses. In the wake of the global economic and financial crisis, the foundation positioned family-managed companies as an alternative to capital market-oriented organizational forms.

The foundation is a sponsor of scientific work in family entrepreneurship, commissioning individual scientists or research institutes with studies. It supports the Witten Institute for Family Businesses at Witten/Herdecke University, the Friedrichshafen Institute for Family Businesses at Zeppelin University, Research Centre for Family Enterprises at the University of Bayreuth, the Institute for Family Businesses – Eastern Westphalia-Lippe at Bielefeld University as well as the Corvinus Center of Family Business at the Corvinus University of Budapest. It also promotes dissertations and post-doctoral theses.

== Publications ==
- Deutschlands nächste Unternehmergeneration [Germany's Next Generation of Business Owners] (in German), Munich: Stiftung Familienunternehmen, 2020 [since 2011], ISBN 978-3-942467-78-0
- Country Index for Family Businesses, Munich: Stiftung Familienunternehmen, ISSN 2566-8544
- Jahresmonitor der Stiftung Familienunternehmen [Annual Monitor of the Foundation for Family Businesses] (in German), Munich: Stiftung Familienunternehmen, 2022 [since 2022], ISBN 978-3-948850-20-3
- Listed Family Firms in Europe (PDF), Munich: Stiftung Familienunternehmen, 2022 [since 2022], ISBN 978-3-948850-17-3

== Controversies ==
The foundation has been criticized for focusing on pursuing lobbying. It is registered with Bundestag as an interest group.
