= Martin Kahanec =

Slovak economist and academic

- Occupation: Economist
- Employer: Central European University
- Known for: Research on labour economics and migration
- Awards: ESET Science Award (2025)

Martin Kahanec is a Slovak economist specialising in labour economics, migration, and European labour markets. He is a professor at the Central European University and co-founder of the Central European Labour Studies Institute (CELSI) in Bratislava.

In 2025, Kahanec received the ESET Science Award in the main category "Outstanding Scientist in Slovakia". In the same year, he was appointed to the Group of Chief Scientific Advisors of the European Commission, becoming the first Slovak member of the group.

== Early life and education ==
Kahanec studied economics at Comenius University in Bratislava and received a Master of Arts in economics from Central European University.

He completed a PhD in economics at Tilburg University in the Netherlands in 2006. His dissertation was titled Social Interaction in the Labor Market: Essays on Earnings Inequality, Labor Substitutability, and Segregation.

== Academic career ==
Kahanec joined Central European University in 2010 and became professor in 2016. He served as acting dean of CEU's School of Public Policy from 2017 to 2019 and again from 2020 to 2021, and later headed CEU's Department of Public Policy from 2021 to 2023.

In 2008, he co-founded the Central European Labour Studies Institute, a Bratislava-based research institute focusing on labour markets and social policy in Central and Eastern Europe.

== Research ==
Kahanec's research focuses on labour economics, migration, labour mobility, inequality, and labour market policy in Europe. His work has examined migration within the European Union, immigrant integration, labour market institutions, and the effects of public policies on labour market outcomes.

He has published research in journals including the Journal of Population Economics, Journal of Ethnic and Migration Studies, International Migration Review, Migration Studies, Environment and Planning A, and Economics of Transition.

Kahanec's research on migration, labour markets, and economic policy has been featured in international media, including The Guardian, The Economist, BBC World News, Handelsblatt, and major Czech and Slovak newspapers.

== Public service ==
In May 2025, Kahanec was appointed to the Group of Chief Scientific Advisors (GCSA) of the European Commission, part of the Commission's Scientific Advice Mechanism. The group provides independent scientific advice to the College of European Commissioners, including on policy issues regarded as being of major importance by the European Parliament or the Council of the European Union. Slovak news agency TASR reported that Kahanec was the first Slovak appointed to the group. The appointment was subsequently included by TASR among the key international developments of 2025.

In November 2026, Kahanec was the lead author of a commentary in Nature, "How democracy depends on science — and must protect it", co-authored with the six other members of the GCSA.

== Honours and recognition ==
Kahanec was elected a member of Academia Europaea in 2016. In 2025, he became Chair of Academia Europaea's Class for Social and Related Sciences, joined its Board of Trustees, and was appointed Vice-President of the academy.

In 2025, Kahanec received the ESET Science Award in the category Outstanding Scientist in Slovakia, becoming the first laureate from the social sciences and humanities to win the award's main category after it was opened to all scientific disciplines. The laureates were selected by an international jury chaired by Nobel Prize laureate Edvard Moser. The award was included by TASR among the key events in science and technology in 2025.

In 2026, Kahanec received the City of Rožňava Prize for contributions to science and for international representation of the city.

== Selected publications ==
- Kahanec, Martin; Zimmermann, Klaus F. (eds.) (2010). EU Labor Markets After Post-Enlargement Migration. Springer. ISBN 978-3-642-02241-8.
- Kahanec, Martin; Zimmermann, Klaus F. (eds.) (2016). Labor Migration, EU Enlargement, and the Great Recession. Springer. ISBN 978-3-662-45319-3.
- Guzi, Martin; Kahanec, Martin; Mýtna Kureková, Lucia (2021). "What Explains Immigrant–Native Gaps in European Labor Markets? The Role of Institutions". Migration Studies, 9(4), 1823–1856.
- Ulceluse, Magdalena; Kahanec, Martin (2023). "Eastward Enlargements of the European Union, Transitional Arrangements and Self-Employment". Journal of Population Economics, 36(2), 719–742.
- Guzi, Martin; Kahanec, Martin; Mýtna Kureková, Lucia (2023). "The Impact of Immigration and Integration Policies on Immigrant–Native Labour Market Hierarchies". Journal of Ethnic and Migration Studies, 49(16), 4169–4187.
- Borsekova, Katarína; Korony, Samuel; Kahanec, Martin (2025). "Decision Tree Insights into Spatial and Temporal Patterns of Convergence in EU Labour Markets". Environment and Planning A: Economy and Space, 57(8), 1096–1120.
- Kahanec, Martin; Ellemers, Naomi; Izdebski, Adam; Łukasik, Rafal M.; Simeonidou, Dimitra; Slama, Rémy; Srinivas, Mangala (November 3, 2026). "How democracy depends on science — and must protect it". Nature, 659, 36–39. doi:10.1038/d41586-026-03510-4. (Commentary; printed under the title "Democracy must protect the science it depends on" on November 5, 2026).
