= Mustafa F. Özbilgin =

Turkish-born British social scientist

Mustafa F. Özbilgin (born 1970) is a Turkish-born British social scientist.

== Biography ==
He is Professor of Human Resource Management at Brunel Business School, Brunel University and was the editor-in-chief of the British Journal of Management between 2010 and 2013. He is also co-chair of Management and Diversity at University Paris-Dauphine in France. Between 2006 and 2010, he served as the editor-in-chief of Equal Opportunities International.

He holds visiting professorships at Panthéon-Assas University, St Gallen University, Cornell University, Japan Institute of Labour Policy, CEPS-INSTEAD, and Istanbul Bilgi University among others. His papers are published in journals including the Academy of Management Review, Academy of Management Learning and Education, Journal of Vocational Behavior, British Journal of Management, Human Relations, Social Science and Medicine, and Human Resource Management.

Özbilgin obtained a BA in Business Administration from Boğaziçi University in Turkey in 1993, an MA in Human Resource Management and Development at Marmara University (also Turkey) in 1995 and a PhD in social sciences at the University of Bristol in 1998.

His research focuses on equality, diversity, and fairness at work from relational, comparative and international perspectives. He founded the annual Equality, Diversity and Inclusion (EDI) Conferences in 2008 in Norwich (UK). Since then the conference was held in Istanbul (Turkey) in 2009, Vienna (Australia) in 2010, and Auckland (New Zealand) in 2011. Next EDI conference will be held in Toulouse (France) in 2012. He is the editor of the book series, International Perspectives on Equality, Diversity and Inclusion (Emerald Press), and associate editor of the journal Gender, Work and Organization.

He is a member of the Reform Club.

== Books ==
Özbilgin has authored and co-edited a number of books including:

- Banking and Gender (2003, IB Tauris-Palgrave)
- International Human Resource Management (2004, Palgrave)
- Arts Marketing (2005, Elsevier)
- Relational Perspectives in Organizational Studies (2006, Edward Elgar)
- Career Choice in Management and Entrepreneurship: a research companion (2007, Edward Elgar)
- Global Diversity Management (2008, Palgrave)
- Equality, Diversity and Inclusion at Work (2009, Edward Elgar)
- Handbook of Research in High-Technology Entrepreneurs (2009, Edward Elgar)
- Managing Gender Diversity in Asia (2010, Edward Elgar)
- Managing Ethnic Diversity in Asia (2010, Edward Elgar)
