= International Journal of Manpower =

Labour economics journal

- Discipline: Human resources, economics
- Language: English
- Edited by: Adrian Ziderman

Publication details
- History: 1980–present
- Publisher: Emerald Group Publishing
- Frequency: 8/year

Standard abbreviations
- ISO 4: Int. J. Manpow.

Indexing
- ISSN: 0143-7720
- OCLC no.: 45281499

Links
- Journal homepage

The International Journal of Manpower is an academic journal published by the Emerald Group, (formerly MCB University Press), addressing topics in labour economics and human resource planning.
