= List of fellows of the Econometric Society =

In the scientific discipline of economics, the Econometric Society is a learned society devoted to the advancement of economics by using mathematical and statistical methods. This article is a list of its (current and in memory) fellows.

== Fellows ==
=== 1933 ===
- Luigi Amoroso
- Oskar N. Anderson
- Albert Aupetit
- Pasquale Boninsegni
- A. L. Bowley
- Clément Colson
- Gustavo Del Vecchio
- François Divisia
- Griffith C. Evans
- Irving Fisher
- Ragnar Frisch
- Corrado Gini
- Gottfried Haberler
- Harold Hotelling
- John M. Keynes
- N. D. Kondratiev
- Wesley C. Mitchell
- H. L. Moore
- Umberto Ricci
- Charles F. Roos
- M. Jacques Rueff
- Erich Schneider
- Henry Schultz
- Joseph A. Schumpeter
- J. Tinbergen
- Felice Vinci
- Edwin B. Wilson
- Wł. Zawadzki
- Frederik Zeuthen

=== 1935 ===
- R. G. D. Allen
- Costantino Bresciani Turroni
- Mordecai Ezekiel
- J. Marschak

=== 1937 ===
- Alfred Cowles 3rd
- J. R. Hicks
- Giorgio Mortara
- René Roy
- Hans Staehle

=== 1939 ===
- Oskar Lange
- Wassily Leontief
- Josiah Charles Stamp
- Theodore Otte Yntema

=== 1940 ===
- William Leonard Crum
- Harold Thayer Davis
- T. Koopmans
- Simon S. Kuznets
- Frederick Cecil Mills
- Gunnar Myrdal
- Gerhard Tintner
- Abraham Wald

=== 1944 ===
- Colin Clark
- Paul H. Douglas
- Trygve Haavelmo
- M. Kalecki
- Paul A. Samuelson

=== 1945 ===
- Nicholas Kaldor
- Jacob L. Mosak
- Bertil Ohlin
- Richard Stone
- Elmer J. Working

=== 1946 ===
- Herman, O. A. Wold

=== 1947 ===
- J.M Clark
- Friedrich A. Hayek
- Leonid Hurwicz
- Erik Lindahl
- Arthur Smithies
- John von Neumann
- Frederick V. Waugh
- Samuel S. Wilks
- Holbrook Working

=== 1948 ===
- Arthur F. Burns
- J. B. D. Derksen
- Luigi Einaudi
- Robert Gibrat
- Lawrence R. Klein
- Abba P. Lerner
- Lloyd A. Metzler
- Egon S. Pearson
- Walter A. Shewhart

=== 1949 ===
- Maurice Allais
- Abram Bergson
- Bernard Chait
- Milton Friedman
- M. G. Kendall
- P.C. Mahalanobis
- Franco Modigliani

=== 1950 ===
- Johan Åkerman
- T. W. Anderson
- Dorothy S. Brady
- R. Maurice Fréchet
- Nicholas Georgescu-Roegen
- Alvin H. Hansen
- Oskar Morgenstern
- Jerzy Neyman

=== 1951 ===
- Kenneth J. Arrow
- Robert Charles Geary
- Richard M. Goodwin
- Georges-Théodule Guilbaud
- R. F. Harrod
- Leo Törnqvist

=== 1952 ===
- Tibor Barna
- Georges Darmois
- Hendrik S. Houthakker
- Jacques J. Polak
- Olav Reiersøl
- James Tobin

=== 1953 ===
- William J. Baumol
- Marcel Boiteux
- George B. Dantzig
- Clifford Hildreth
- Don Patinkin
- P. J. Verdoorn

=== 1954 ===
- Gérard Debreu
- Pierre Benjamin Daniel Massé
- Hans Philip Neisser
- Herbert A. Simon

=== 1955 ===
- Robert Dorfman
- Edmond Malinvaud
- Sten Malmquist
- Kazuo Mizutani
- Richard Ruggles
- Henri Theil

=== 1956 ===
- John S. Chipman
- P. de Wolff
- Eraldo Fossati
- Guy Henderson Orcutt
- Hans Peter

=== 1957 ===
- William W. Cooper
- Robert M. Solow
- Michel Verhulst
- Jacob Wolfowitz

=== 1958 ===
- Martin J. Beckmann
- Hollis B. Chenery
- Bent Hansen
- Lionel W. McKenzie
- Michio Morishima
- Thomson M. Whitin

=== 1959 ===
- Abraham Charnes
- Karl A. Fox
- Harry M. Markowitz
- G. L. S. Shackle
- Robert H. Strotz

=== 1960 ===
- Alan S. Manne
- Marc Nerlove
- Hirofumi Uzawa

=== 1961 ===
- Bruno de Finetti
- W. M. Gorman
- Frank H. Hahn
- Harold W. Kuhn
- Roy Radner

=== 1962 ===
- Robert Eisner
- M. J. Farrell
- Shinichi Ichimura
- Hukukane Nikaidô
- Herbert E. Scarf

=== 1963 ===
- Karl H. Borch
- Franklin M. Fisher
- William Jaffé
- J. Johnston
- Wilhelm E. Krelle
- John D. Sargan

=== 1964 ===
- Arthur S. Goldberger
- Zvi Griliches
- Earl O. Heady
- Dale W. Jorgenson
- André Nataf
- A. W. Phillips

=== 1965 ===
- Robert J. Aumann
- Jacques Drèze
- David Gale
- Edwin Kuh
- Ta-Chung Liu
- Jan Sandee
- Arnold Zellner

=== 1966 ===
- Albert Ando
- R. L. Basmann
- James S. Duesenberry
- Edward J. Hannan
- Leif Johansen
- Nissan Liviatan
- John R. Meyer
- Takashi Negishi
- George J. Stigler
- Daniel B. Suits

=== 1967 ===
- Gary Becker
- Michael Bruno
- Gregory C. Chow
- Carl F. Christ
- James Durbin
- Walter D. Fisher
- Arnold Harberger
- Jacques Lesourne
- Edmund S. Phelps
- Lloyd S. Shapley
- William S. Vickrey

=== 1968 ===
- Irma Adelman
- Anton P. Barten
- Peter A. Diamond
- Evsey D. Domar
- Arthur Hanau
- John C. Harsanyi
- Charles J. Hitch
- Ken-Ichi Inada
- János Kornai
- Benoit Mandelbrot
- John F. Muth
- Richard E. Quandt
- Amartya Sen
- Lester Telser
- Carl von Weizsäcker

=== 1970 ===
- Ragnar Bentzel
- Sukhamoy Chakraborty
- Phoebus J. Dhrymes
- Otto Eckstein
- Martin Feldstein
- Edwin Mansfield
- Daniel McFadden
- James Mirrlees
- Yair Mundlak
- A. L. Nagar
- Stanley Reiter
- Wiesław Sadowski
- T. N. Srinivasan
- Karl Vind
- Menahem Yaari

=== 1971 ===
- Pietro Balestra
- Rex Bergstrom
- András Bródy
- Nikolay P. Fedorenko
- William Fellner
- Robert W. Fogel
- Werner Hildenbrand
- Charles C. Holt
- Ronald W. Jones
- Murray C. Kemp
- Mordecai Kurz
- David Levhari
- John Lintner
- Arthur Okun
- Ronald W. Shephard
- Eytan Sheshinski
- Martin Shubik
- Jean Waelbroeck
- Alan A. Walter
- Tsunehiko Watanabe

=== 1972 ===
- David Cass
- J. S. Cramer
- R. E. Gomory
- C. W. J. Granger
- Harry G. Johnson
- Leonid V. Kantorovich
- Kevin J. Lancaster
- Richard G. Lipsey
- Jacob Mincer
- C. R. Rao
- Karl Shell
- Hugo Sonnenschein

=== 1973 ===
- R. J. Ball
- Jagdish Bhagwati
- Anne Carter
- Eugene F. Fama
- Stephen M. Goldfeld
- Robert E. Hall
- Serge-Christophe Kolm
- Assar Lindbeck
- Bagicha Singh Minhas
- Jan Mossin
- Krzysztof Porwit
- Reinhard Selten
- Joseph E. Stiglitz

=== 1974 ===
- Takeshi Amemiya
- A. B. Atkinson
- W. A. Brock
- Peter C. Fishburn
- J. M. Grandmont
- Michio Hatanaka
- John W. Pratt
- Marcel K. Richter
- Michael Rothschild
- Christopher A. Sims

=== 1975 ===
- Dennis J. Aigner
- C. J. Bliss
- William C. Brainard
- Phillip Cagan
- Partha Dasgupta
- Paul A. David
- W. E. Diewert
- Jerry R. Green
- Giora Hanoch
- David Forbes Hendry
- William C. Hood
- A. A. Konüs
- Robert E. Lucas, Jr.
- G. S. Maddala
- Thomas A. Marschak
- Merton H. Miller
- Walter Y. Oi
- Ivor F. Pearce
- Howard Raiffa
- David A. Starrett
- Kenneth F. Wallis

=== 1976 ===
- S. N. Afriat
- G. Christopher Archibald
- Yoram Ben-Porath
- Irwin Friend
- Claude Henry
- Donald D. Hester
- Lawrence J. Lau
- Mukul Majumdar
- Rolf R. Mantel
- Stephen Marglin
- Sherwin Rosen
- Agnar Sandmo
- Thomas J. Sargent
- Peter Schönfeld
- Andrew Michael Spence
- Harold W. Watts
- Martin Weitzman
- Oliver E. Williamson
- Robert Wilson

=== 1977 ===
- Orley Ashenfelter
- Richard M. Cyert
- Avinash Dixit
- Ray C. Fair
- Stanley Fischer
- James W. Friedman
- Robert J. Gordon
- Theodore Groves
- Peter J. Hammond
- Geoffrey Martin Heal
- Bert G. Hickman
- Edward E. Leamer
- John Ledyard
- Albert Madansky
- Andreu Mas-Colell
- Bezalel Peleg
- Robert A. Pollak
- Thomas J. Rothenberg
- Dieter Sondermann
- Paul Taubman

=== 1978 ===
- Abel Gesevich Aganbegyan
- Masanao Aoki
- Truman F. Bewley
- Edwin Burmeister
- Robert W. Clower
- Otto A. Davis
- Angus S. Deaton
- Rudi Dornbusch
- Koichi Hamada
- Yakar Kannai
- Teun Kloek
- Jean-Jacques Laffont
- Valery L. Makarov
- Jean-Claude Milleron
- Leonard J. Mirman
- Dale T. Mortensen
- András Nagy
- Luigi L. Pasinetti
- Prasanta K. Pattanaik
- András Prékopa
- F. Graham Pyatt
- J. Trout Rader, III
- Stephen A. Ross
- Takamitsu Sawa
- José Alexandre Scheinkman
- Nicholas H. Stern
- Witold Trzeciakowski
- Sidney G. Winter
- Sewall Wright
- Yves Younès

=== 1979 ===
- George Akerlof
- Maria Augustinovics
- Morris H. DeGroot
- Jean Jaskold Gabszewicz
- Oliver Hart
- Jerry A. Hausman
- Richard Kihlstrom
- Irving Bernard Kravis
- Guy Laroque
- John Muellbauer
- Robert A. Mundell
- Philip S. Wolfe

=== 1980 ===
- Yves Balasko
- Robert J. Barro
- Jere R. Behrman
- Duncan Black
- Sanford Grossman
- Roger Guesnerie
- James J. Heckman
- James S. Jordan, Jr.
- Jan Kmenta
- Michael C. Lovell
- Harold F. Lydall
- Stephen J. Nickell
- Louis Phlips
- Edward C. Prescott
- Jean-François Richard
- David Schmeidler
- Robert J. Shiller
- Finis Welch

=== 1981 ===
- Masahiko Aoki
- Jean-Pascal Benassy
- Alan S. Blinder
- Donald Brown
- Gary Chamberlain
- Paul Champsaur
- Robert F. Engle
- Birgit Grodal
- Martin F. Hellwig
- David M. Kreps
- Anne O. Krueger
- Eric Maskin
- Jean-François Mertens
- Peter Charles Bonest Phillips
- Stephen J. Turnovsky
- Neil Wallace
- Robert D. Willig

=== 1982 ===
- Richard A. Easterlin
- Jacob A. Frenkel
- John W. Geweke
- Michael D. Intriligator
- Mervyn A. King
- Béla Martos
- D. John Roberts
- Richard L. Schmalensee
- Stephen Smale
- Charles A. Wilson

=== 1983 ===
- Beth E. Allen
- Bengt R. Holmström
- Robert C. Merton
- Paul Milgrom
- Hervé Moulin
- Roger B. Myerson
- Richard D. Portes
- John G. Riley
- Alvin E. Roth
- Hal R. Varian
- Halbert L. White, Jr.

=== 1984 ===
- Claude d'Aspremont
- Allan F. Gibbard
- Lars Peter Hansen
- Charles F. Manski
- William D. Nordhaus
- Joseph M. Ostroy
- Kevin W. S. Roberts
- Myron S. Scholes
- John B. Shoven
- John B. Taylor

=== 1985 ===
- Olivier Jean Blanchard
- A. Ronald Gallant
- Sergiu Hart
- Jack Hirshleifer
- Alberto Holly
- Alain Monfort
- A. R. Pagan
- Charles R. Plott
- Andrew Postlewaite
- Ariel Rubinstein
- N. Eugene Savin
- Lawrence H. Summers
- Robert M. Townsend

=== 1986 ===
- Alan Auerbach
- François Bourguignon
- Egbert Dierker
- Louis Gevers
- Christian Gouriéroux
- Reuben Gronau
- Elhanan Helpman
- George G. Judge
- Heinz König
- Paul R. Krugman
- Richard Layard
- Jacques Mairesse
- Chikashi Moriguchi
- Michael Mussa
- John E. Roemer
- Harvey Rosen
- Robert W. Rosenthal
- Jeffrey Sachs
- Mark A. Satterthwaite
- Jean Tirole
- David A. Wise

=== 1987 ===
- Robert M. Anderson
- Aloisio Araujo
- Kenneth George Binmore
- Drew Fudenberg
- Douglas M. Gale
- Edward J. Green
- Thomas E. MaCurdy
- J. Peter Neary
- Vernon L. Smith
- Nancy L. Stokey

=== 1988 ===
- Salvador Barberà
- Charles Blackorby
- Henry Farber
- Milton Harris
- Fumio Hayashi
- Paul L. Joskow
- Ehud Kalai
- Edward Lazear
- Ariél Pakes
- James Michael Poterba
- Alan A. Powell
- Peter Schmidt
- Steven Shavell
- Ken Singleton
- Alan. D. Woodland

=== 1989 ===
- Donald W. K. Andrews
- Costas Azariadis
- Larry G. Epstein
- John Geanakoplos
- Boyan Jovanovic
- Kenneth L. Judd
- Nicholas M. Kiefer
- David K. Levine
- Mark Machina
- Michael Maschler
- John Moore
- D. M. G. Newbery
- Whitney Newey
- Abraham Neyman
- M. Hashem Pesaran
- Victor Polterovich
- Robert H. Porter
- Jennifer F. Reinganum
- Peter M. Robinson
- Richard Roll
- Robert Summers
- Andrew Weiss
- Richard J. Zeckhauser

=== 1990 ===
- David P. Baron
- Timothy F. Bresnahan
- Jeremy I. Bulow
- John Y. Campbell
- John C. Cox
- Vincent P. Crawford
- Douglas W. Diamond
- Pradeep Dubey
- Louis-André Gérard-Varet
- Andrew C. Harvey
- Alan P. Kirman
- Lung-Fei Lee
- James MacKinnon
- John F. Nash
- Masahiro Okuno-Fujiwara
- James L. Powell
- Paul Romer
- Julio J. Rotemberg
- Joel Sobel
- Kotaro Suzumura
- Lars E. O. Svensson
- William Thomson
- John Whalley

=== 1991 ===
- Andrew B. Abel
- Dilip Abreu
- Kaushik Basu
- B. Douglas Bernheim
- Richard Blundell
- Trevor S. Breusch
- David Card
- Richard H. Day
- Gabrielle Demange
- Wilfred J. Ethier
- Claudia Goldin
- Timothy J. Kehoe
- Elon Kohlberg
- Anthony Lancaster
- David Pearce
- Herakles Polemarchakis
- Kenneth S. Rogoff
- Avner Shaked
- Joaquim Silvestre
- Thomas M. Stoker
- John Sutton
- Asher Wolinsky
- Michael Woodford

=== 1992 ===
- Jess Benhabib
- Andrew S. Caplin
- Jacques Crémer
- Gene M. Grossman
- Takatoshi Ito
- Laurence J. Kotlikoff
- Finn E. Kydland
- Steve Matthews
- Bennett T. McCallum
- Kazuo Nishimura
- James H. Stock
- Jacques-François Thisse
- Xavier Vives
- Mark W. Watson
- Shmuel Zamir

=== 1993 ===
- Philippe Aghion
- Patrick Bolton
- Christophe Chamley
- Eric van Damme
- Manfred Deistler
- Mathias Dewatripont
- Wayne A. Fuller
- Daniel Kahneman
- Lawrence Katz
- John H. Pencavel
- Robert S. Pindyck
- Debraj Ray
- John Rust
- Andrei Shleifer
- Amos Tversky
- Kenneth D. West
- Michael D. Whinston

=== 1994 ===
- W. Brian Arthur
- Roland Bénabou
- Ernst R. Berndt
- Stephen R. Cosslett
- Russell Davidson
- Peter Howitt
- Arie Kapteyn
- Paul Klemperer
- Glenn C. Loury
- Richard D. McKelvey
- Assaf Razin
- Michael H. Riordan
- Mark Rosenzweig
- Larry Samuelson
- Wayne J. Shafer
- George Tauchen
- Peyton Young
- William R. Zame

=== 1995 ===
- Abhijit V. Banerjee
- Guillermo A. Calvo
- Pierre-André Chiappori
- J. Darrell Duffie
- Jonathan Eaton
- Roger H. Gordon
- Bo Honoré
- Larry E. Jones
- George J. Mailath
- Rosa L. Matzkin
- Preston McAfee
- Thomas R. Palfrey
- Dale J. Poirier
- Rafael Robb
- Jean-Charles Rochet
- Kenneth I. Wolpin

=== 1996 ===
- Joseph G. Altonji
- Jeffrey S. Banks
- Martin Browning
- Russell Cooper
- Eddie Dekel
- Bhaskar Dutta
- Faruk Gül
- Daniel S. Hamermesh
- James D. Hamilton
- Joel Horowitz
- Cheng Hsiao
- Morton I. Kamien
- Alan B. Krueger
- Maurice Obstfeld
- Philip Reny
- Anthony F. Shorrocks

=== 1997 ===
- Ben S. Bernanke
- Steven Neil Durlauf
- David Easley
- Martin S. Eichenbaum
- Françoise Forges
- Nobuhiro Kiyotaki
- John J. McCall
- John McMillan
- Tapan Mitra
- Robert A. Moffitt
- Torsten Persson
- Christopher A. Pissarides
- Quang H. Vuong
- Randall Wright

=== 1998 ===
- Joshua Angrist
- Lawrence E. Blume
- George J. Borjas
- Ricardo Caballero
- Varadarajan V. Chari
- Thomas F. Cooley
- Francis X. Diebold
- Jean-Marie Dufour
- Mark Gertler
- Matthew O. Jackson
- Roger Koenker
- Margaret A. Meyer
- Eric Renault
- Patrick Rey
- Dov E. Samet
- John Vickers

=== 1999 ===
- Steven Berry
- Tim Bollerslev
- Kenneth Burdett
- Colin F. Camerer
- Andrew Chesher
- Avner Greif
- Seppo Honkapohja
- Michihiro Kandori
- Kiminori Matsuyama
- Costas Meghir
- Motty Perry
- William P. Rogerson
- Jörgen Weibull

=== 2000 ===
- Ted Bergstrom
- Timothy J. Besley
- Zvi Eckstein
- Glenn Ellison
- Itzhak Gilboa
- Bruce E. Hansen
- Hugo A. Hopenhayn
- Søren Johansen
- Patrick J. Kehoe
- Michael Magill
- Wolfgang Pesendorfer
- Martine Quinzii
- Matthew Rabin
- Sylvain Sorin

=== 2001 ===
- Orazio Attanasio
- Lawrence Christiano
- John Cochrane
- Guido Imbens
- Edi Karni
- Ehud Lehrer
- Bernard Salanié
- Ennio Stacchetti
- Guido Tabellini
- Myrna Wooders

=== 2002 ===
- Yacine Aït-Sahalia
- Alberto F. Alesina
- Manuel Arellano
- Michele Boldrin
- In-Koo Cho
- John Conlisk
- Raymond Deneckere
- Joseph Farrell
- Robert Gibbons
- Vijay Krishna
- Albert S. (Pete) Kyle
- Andrew W. Lo
- Stephen Morris
- Joon Y. Park
- Rafael Repullo
- Chris Shannon
- Jeffrey M. Wooldridge

=== 2003 ===
- Kalyan Chatterjee
- Dennis Epple
- Roger E. A. Farmer
- Jordi Galí
- Jinyong Hahn
- V. Joseph Hotz
- John Kagel
- Arthur Lewbel
- Hitoshi Matsushima
- Charles R. Nelson
- Martin J. Osborne
- Geert Ridder
- Paul A. Ruud
- Ilya Segal
- Arunava Sen
- Tayfun Sönmez
- Marilda Antonia de Oliveira Sotomayor
- Harald Uhlig
- Anthony J. Venables
- Peter Wakker

=== 2004 ===
- Anat Admati
- Susan Athey
- John Bound
- Adam Brandenburger
- Stephen Coate
- Pinelopi K. Goldberg
- Christopher J. Harris
- Kenneth Hendricks
- Philippe Jehiel
- Steven Levitt
- Benny Moldovanu
- Aldo Rustichini
- Neil Shephard
- Hyun-Song Shin
- Jeroen Swinkels

=== 2005 ===
- Daron Acemoğlu
- Andrew G. Atkeson
- Kyle Bagwell
- Herman J. Bierens
- Edward L. Glaeser
- Michael P. Keane
- John Kennan
- Narayana Kocherlakota
- Barton L. Lipman
- W. Bentley MacLeod
- James M. Malcomson
- David Martimort
- Richard D. Rogerson
- Christopher Udry

=== 2006 ===
- Per Krusell
- Andrew McLennan
- Sérgio Rebelo
- Jean-Marc Robin
- Robert Shimer

=== 2007 ===
- Fernando Alvarez
- Lawrence M. Ausubel
- Dirk Bergemann
- Xiaohong Chen
- John C. Heaton
- Hidehiko Ichimura
- Oliver Linton
- Alessandro Lizzeri
- Pierre Perron
- Michael Peters
- José Víctor Ríos Rull
- Arthur Robson
- Thomas C. Schelling
- Richard J. Smith
- Jonathan P. Thomas
- Juuso Välimäki

=== 2008 ===
- Torben G. Andersen
- Mark Armstrong
- Martin Cripps
- Ernst Fehr
- Jeremy Greenwood
- Phil Haile
- Ian Jewitt
- Michael Kremer
- Jonathan Levin
- Akihiko Matsui
- Marc Melitz
- Dilip Mookherjee
- Monika Piazzesi
- Robert W. Staiger
- Elie Tamer

=== 2009 ===
- Helmut Bester
- Anne C. Case
- Yeon-Koo Che
- Victor Chernozhukov
- Jeffrey Ely
- Han Hong
- Mamoru Kaneko
- Yuichi Kitamura
- Robert Duncan Luce
- Thierry Magnac
- Roberto S. Mariano
- Cesar Martinelli
- Paulo Klinger Monteiro
- Kimio Morimune
- John Nachbar
- Juan Pablo Nicolini
- Manuel Santos
- Lones Smith
- Petra E. Todd
- Mark Walker
- Lin Zhou

=== 2010 ===
- Franklin Allen
- Bruno Biais
- Peter Bossaerts
- Markus K. Brunnermeier
- Parkash Chander
- Esther Duflo
- Jean-Pierre Florens
- Robert G. King
- Felix Kubler
- Ignacio N. Lobato
- George Loewenstein
- Pablo Andrés Neumeyer
- John Quiggin
- Klaus M. Schmidt
- T. Paul Schultz
- Yoon-Jae Whang

=== 2011 ===
- James Andreoni
- Pierpaolo Battigalli
- Nicholas Bloom
- Hongbin Cai
- Soo Hong Chew
- Xavier Gabaix
- Johannes Hörner
- Thomas J. Holmes
- Samuel S. Kortum
- David Laibson
- Albert Marcet
- Joel Mokyr
- Mariano Tommasi
- Edward J. Vytlacil
- Joel Watson
- Fabrizio Zilibotti

=== 2012 ===
- David Austen-Smith
- Alberto Bisin
- Raj Chetty
- Liran Einav
- Eduardo Engel
- Amy Finkelstein
- Jacob Goeree
- Christian Gollier
- Simon Grant
- Atsushi Kajii
- Rachel Kranton
- Ellen R. McGrattan
- Antonio Merlo
- Marcelo Moreira
- Yingyi Qian
- Suzanne Scotchmer
- Uzi Segal
- Enrique Sentana
- Andrzej Skrzypacz
- Richard Thaler
- John Van Reenen
- Stanley E. Zin

=== 2013 ===
- Jushan Bai
- Marianne Bertrand
- Judith Chevalier
- Olivier Compte
- Janet Currie
- Keisuke Hirano
- Ali Hortaçsu
- Francis Kramarz
- Massimo Marinacci
- Aviv Nevo
- Thomas Piketty
- Andrea Prat
- Hélène Rey
- Roberto Serrano
- Jeremy Stein
- Kjetil Storesletten
- Gerard van den Berg
- Iván Werning
- Junsen Zhang

=== 2014 ===
- John M. Abowd
- David Autor
- Marco Battaglini
- Matthew Gentzkow
- Mikhail Golosov
- Bruno Jullien
- Pete Klenow
- Sokbae Lee
- Thomas Mariotti
- Ulrich Müller
- Emmanuel Saez
- Susanne Schennach
- Rani Spiegler
- Janet L. Yellen

=== 2015 ===
- George-Marios Angeletos
- Pol Antràs
- Patrick Bajari
- C. Lanier Benkard
- Harold Cole
- Emmanuel Farhi
- Michael Greenstone
- Igal Hendel
- John A. List
- Serena Ng
- Martin Pesendorfer
- Christopher Phelan
- Francis Vella

=== 2016 ===
- Alberto Abadie
- Oriana Bandiera
- Jean-Pierre Benoît
- Raquel Fernández
- Rachel Griffith
- Jonathan Gruber
- John Haltiwanger
- Enrico Moretti
- Parag Pathak
- Luigi Pistaferri
- Lucrezia Reichlin
- Giovanni L. Violante
- Rajiv Vohra
- Annette Vissing-Jørgensen
- John Wooders
- Yves Zenou

=== 2017 ===
- Elchanan Ben-Porath
- Mark Bils
- Stéphane Bonhomme
- Dave Donaldson
- Juan Dubra
- Robert C. Feenstra
- Sergio Firpo
- Richard Holden
- Elyès Jouini
- Eliana La Ferrara
- Robert A. Miller
- Muriel Niederle
- Michele Piccione
- Jack Porter
- Esteban Rossi-Hansberg
- Yuliy Sannikov
- Jesse Shapiro
- Michèle Tertilt
- Leeat Yariv
- Tao Zha

=== 2018 ===
- Mark Aguiar
- Peter Arcidiacono
- Jan De Loecker
- Pascaline Dupas
- Hanming Fang
- Chaim Fershtman
- Roland Fryer
- Masahisa Fujita
- Gita Gopinath
- Sanjeev Goyal
- Yongmiao Hong
- Philipp Kircher
- Nour Meddahi
- Claudio Mezzetti
- Anna Mikusheva
- Fabien Postel-Vinay
- Valerie A. Ramey
- Frank Schorfheide
- Azeem M. Shaikh
- Christopher Taber
- Jaume Ventura
- Leonard Wantchekon

=== 2019 ===
- Alison Booth
- Francesco Caselli
- Sylvain Chassang
- Jan Eeckhout
- Claudio Ferraz
- Kate Ho
- Guido Lorenzoni
- Juan-Pablo Montero
- Yaw Nyarko
- Nicola Persico
- Ricardo Reis
- Barbara Rossi
- Bruno Strulovici
- Tomasz Strzalecki

=== 2020 ===
- Manuel Amador
- Isaiah Andrews
- Raouf Boucekkine
- Moshe Buchinsky
- Aureo de Paula
- Melissa Dell
- Peter DeMarzo
- Habiba Djebbari
- Matthias Doepke
- Federico Echenique
- Chris Edmond
- Joan María Esteban
- Jesús Fernández-Villaverde
- Christopher J. Flinn
- Nicola Fuchs-Schündeln
- Alfred Galichon
- Pierre-Olivier Gourinchas
- Kaddour Hadri
- Marina Halac
- Charles I. Jones
- Emir Kamenica
- Greg Kaplan
- Maxwell King
- Dirk Krueger
- Gilat Levy
- Francesca Molinari
- Massimo Morelli
- Jessica Pan
- Alessandro Pavan
- Thomas Philippon
- John K.H. Quah
- Imran Rasul
- Stephen J. Redding
- Ernesto Schargrodsky
- Martin Schneider
- Carl Shapiro
- Margaret Slade
- Rodrigo Soares
- Chad Syverson
- Adam Szeidl
- Steve Tadelis
- Satoru Takahashi
- Fernando Vega-Redondo
- Heidi Williams
- Steven R. Williams
- Muhamet Yildiz

=== 2021 ===
- Jaap Abbring
- Chunrong Ai
- Ufuk Akcigit
- Simon Board
- Antonio Cabrales
- Arnaud Costinot
- Peter Cramton
- Stefano DellaVigna
- Prosper Dovonon
- Christian Dustmann
- Graham Elliot
- Marcela Eslava
- Armin Falk
- Oded Galor
- Yuriy Gorodnichenko
- Veronica Guerrieri
- Luigi Guiso
- Bård Harstad
- Erik Hurst
- Patrick Kline
- Fuhito Kojima
- Botond Kőszegi
- Rim Lahmandi-Ayed
- John Leahy
- Sydney C. Ludvigson
- Ulrike Malmendier
- Ramon Marimon
- Alexandre Mas
- Atif Mian
- Magne Mogstad
- Benjamin Moll
- Sendhil Mullainathan
- Victor Murinde
- Emi Nakamura
- Volker Nocke
- Nathan Nunn
- Rohini Pande
- Bruce Preston
- James Robinson
- Christina Romer
- Antoinette Schoar
- Matthew Shum
- Rohini Somanathan
- Stefanie Stantcheva
- Wing Chuen Suen
- Balázs Szentes
- Silvana Tenreyro
- Aleh Tsyvinski
- Nicolas Vieille
- Ebonya Washington
- Ekaterina Zhuravskaya

=== 2022 ===
- Mary Amiti
- Leah Boustan
- Irene Brambilla
- Pedro Carneiro
- Songnian Chen
- Pierre Dubois
- Eduardo Faingold
- Alessandro Gavazza
- Nicola Gennaioli
- Raffaella Giacomini
- Pauline Grosjean
- Fatih Guvenen
- Chang-Tai Hsieh
- Oleg Itskhoki
- Dean Karlan
- Navin Kartik
- Ilyana Kuziemko
- Ricardo Lagos
- Thomas Lemieux
- Guido Menzio
- Giuseppe Moscarini
- Rosemarie Nagel
- Benjamin Olken
- Marco Ottaviani
- Giorgio Primiceri
- Nancy Qian
- Morten Ravn
- Marzena Rostek
- Andres Santos
- Jon Steinsson
- Maxwell B. Stinchcombe
- Philipp Strack
- Amir Sufi
- Alemayehu Seyoum Taffesse
- Laura Lisl Veldkamp
- Alessandra Voena
- Hans-Joachim Voth
- Alex Wolitzky

=== 2023 ===
- Nava Ashraf
- Steve Bond
- Tilman Börgers
- Robin Burgess
- Gabriel Carroll
- Yongsung Chang
- Dean Corbae
- Mariacristina De Nardi
- Ben Golub
- Christian Hellwig
- Michael Jansson
- Steven Koch
- Thierry Mayer
- Hyungsik Roger Moon
- Georg Nöldeke
- Emanuel Ornelas
- Pietro Ortoleva
- Sven Rady
- Gil Riella
- Uta Schönberg
- Katsumi Shimotsu
- Marciano Siniscalchi
- Vasiliki Skreta
- Zheng Song
- Yves Sprumont
- Abderrahim Taamouti
- Pierre-Olivier Weill
- Wei Xiong
- Motohiro Yogo

=== 2024 ===
- Jerome Adda
- Cristina Arellano
- Costas Arkolakis
- John Asker
- David Atkin
- Paul Beaudry
- Sascha O. Becker
- Sandra E. Black
- Estelle Cantillon
- Alessandra Casella
- Thomas Chaney
- David Dorn
- Janice Eberly
- Kfir Eliaz
- Erica Field
- Andrea Galeotti
- Francisco Gallego
- Maitreesh Ghatak
- Olivier Gossner
- Ayşe Ökten İmrohoroğlu
- Henrik Kleven
- Kala Krishna
- Jeanne Lafortune
- Francesco Lippi
- Deborah J. Lucas
- Annamaria Lusardi
- N. Gregory Mankiw
- Kalina Manova
- Elena Manresa
- Enrique G. Mendoza
- Ismael Y. Mourifie
- Barry Nalebuff
- Andrew Newman
- Efe A. Ok
- Guillermo Ordonez
- Maria Petrova
- Mar Reguant
- Diego Restuccia
- Andrés Rodríguez-Clare
- Andrea Weber
- Luigi Zingales
- Gabriel Zucman

=== 2025 ===
- S. Nageeb Ali
- Heather Anderson
- Debopam Bhattacharya
- Francis Bloch
- Eric Budish
- Yi-Chun Chen
- Xavier D’Haultfoeuille
- Cecile Gaubert
- Bryan S. Graham
- Nathaniel Hendren
- Oscar Jorda
- Anil Kashyap
- Jinwoo Kim
- Frank Kleibergen
- Ivana Komunjer
- Leslie Marx
- Edward Miguel
- Debasis Mishra
- Tymofiy Mylovanov
- Fabrizio Perri
- David Romer
- Roland Strausz
- Francesco Trebbi
- Eyal Winter
