= Andrew Harvey =

Andrew or Andy Harvey may refer to:

- Andy Harvey (fl. 1937–1938), American baseball player
- Andrew Harvey (journalist) (born 1944), British journalist
- Andrew Harvey (religious writer) (born 1952), author, religious scholar and teacher of mystic traditions
- Andrew Harvey (politician), Canadian politician
- Andrew Harvey (fictional character), character in The Ambassador's Daughter
- Andrew C. Harvey, econometrics professor
