= Bioeconomics =

Bioeconomics may refer to:

- Bioeconomics (fisheries), the study of the dynamics of living resources using economic models
- Bioeconomics (biophysical), the study of economic systems applying the laws of thermodynamics
- Biological economics, the study of the relationship between human biology and economics
- Bioeconomics, the social theory of Nicholas Georgescu-Roegen
