= Brian Graham =

Brian or Bryan Graham may refer to:

- Brian Graham (baseball) (born 1960), former minor league baseball player, coach and manager
- Brian Graham (footballer) (born 1987), Scottish footballer for Partick Thistle
- Brian Graham (rugby league) (born 1936), Australian rugby league footballer
- Brian Graham, Irish television producer, director and presenter, known for Jo Maxi
- Bryan S. Graham, economist and professor
