= Martin Schneider (disambiguation) =

Martin Schneider is a German comedian, cabarettist and actor.

Martin Schneider may also refer to:

- Martin Schneider (footballer), German footballer
- Martin Schneider (economist), German economist
- Martin Schneider (opera director), German opera director
- Martin Gotthard Schneider, German theologian, church musician, songwriter, and academic teacher
