= Xiaohong Chen =

Chinese economist

- Born: Wuhan, Hubei, China
- Education: Wuhan University (B.A.) Renmin University of China (USA-China Joint Graduate Program) University of Western Ontario (M.A.) University of California, San Diego (Ph.D.)
- Employer: Yale University
- Honours: 2018 Sargan Lecturer, Econometric Society 2012 Fellow of Journal of Econometrics 2007 Fellow of the Econometric Society

Xiaohong Chen (Chinese: 陈晓红) is a Chinese economist who currently serves as the Tjalling C. Koopmans Professor of Economics at Yale University. She is a fellow of the Econometric Society and a laureate of the China Economics Prize. As one of the leading experts in econometrics, her research focuses on econometric theory, Semi/nonparametric estimation and inference methods, Sieve methods, Nonlinear time series, and Semi/nonparametric models. She was elected to the American Academy of Arts and Sciences in 2019.

== Early life and education ==
Chen was born in Hubei, China. She earned a B.A. in Mathematics from Wuhan University in 1986, was part of the USA-China Graduate program through the People's University of China in 1987, earned an M.A. in Economics from University of Western Ontario in 1988, and a PhD in Economics from University of California, San Diego in 1993.

== Career and research ==
Chen is currently the Malcolm K. Brachman Professor of Economics at Yale University. She previously taught at the London School of Economics, New York University, and the University of Chicago. After graduation from the University of California, San Diego, she became an assistant professor in economics at University of Chicago, a lecturer and reader at London School of Economics from 1999 to 2002. Thereafter, she joined New York University as an associate professor and she was promoted to professor of economics in 2005. In 2007, she became a professor of economics at Yale University. At Yale, she is a professor of Management and Statistics of Data Science. Chen is also an International Fellow of the Centre for Microdata Methods and Practice, an elected fellow of the Econometric Society, and an elected fellow of the Journal of Econometrics.

=== Selected research ===
- "Identification and Estimation of nonlinear models using two samples with nonclassical measurement errors" (2010): The winner of The Journal of Nonparametric Statistics 2010 Best Paper Award

In the article, Raymond J. Carroll, Xiaohong Chen and Yingyao Hu propose an approach to identify and estimate a general nonlinear errors-in-variable (EIV) model without validation data, measurement error distribution, and instrumental variables. They utilize two samples which are supposed to contain three parts for each sample, including a dependent variable (Y), certain error-free covariates (W), and one measurement of the error-ridden covariate (X). The corresponding true variable is not measured precisely in two samples and the latent true values might be randomly associated with the unknown measure error distribution. Without knowing the measurement error distribution that might be associated with latent true values and the precise corresponding true variable, the authors suppose the latent true covariate and the error-free covariates in the dependent variable are the same. However, the latent true variables distributed differently across observed and specific error-free variables. In addition, they also propose a sieve quasi-MLE method to estimate parameter in the parametric regression model and "establish its root-n consistency and asymptotic normality under possible misspecification, and its semiparametric efficiency under correct specification, with easily estimated standard errors".

- "Land of Addicts? An Empirical Investigation of Habit-Based Asset Pricing Models" (2009): The winner of The Richard Stone Prize in Applied Econometrics

The scarceness of habit function leads to the difficulty in formal estimation. Xiaohong Chen and Sydney C. Ludvigson study a general class of habit-based asset pricing model by using the semiparametric approach in this article. Without putting constraints on the habit function, they estimate both finite dimensional parameters and the habit specification. They have three main findings in their paper, as following: "the estimated habit function is nonlinear", "habit formation is better described as internal rather than external, and the estimated time-preference parameter and the power utility parameter are sensible". Comparing with the SMD-estimated external habit model, the three-factor asset pricing model, the scaled consumption CAMP model, the classic CAPM, and the classic consumption CAPM, the SMD-estimated internal habit model have more advantages in explaining "a cross-section of size and book-market sorted portfolio equity returns".

Their study tries to overcome the limitation on formal estimation and testing. One significant limitation is the lack of the functional form of the habit. Another limitation is the lack of "theoretical reason why other forms of nonlinearities could not be entertained". The habit-based asset pricing model is assessed, and they tried to put fewer constraints on the habit specification and the motion law for consumption is not put any parametric constraints on. They exam the unknown habit function and compare the internal habit and external habit formation by Sieve Minimum Distance (SMD) procedure. By using this method, they test their hypotheses about the habit-based asset pricing models' specification. For the first hypothesis, they test the linearity and find that nonlinear is more appropriate to depict the habit function. Conditional moment constraint is used to compare the internal habit and external habit specification. For the second hypothesis, they conclude that the internal habit formation is more proper to describe habit formation. For the third hypothesis, they estimate the "quantitative importance of the habit in the power utility specification" by utilizing the SMD method and they find that time-discount factor and power utility curvature parameter are sensible toward different instruments and returns.

- "Estimation of Copula-based Semiparametric Time Series Models" (2006): The winner of the 2008 Arnold Zellner Award

In the article, the unknown marginal distribution estimators and the copula dependence parameter estimators are given in Xiaohong Chen and Yanqin Fan's studies of copula-based semiparametric stationary Markov time series models that contains nonparametric marginal distributions and parameterized copulas. Chen and Fan also estimate the characteristics of transitional distribution of the time series by using the two estimators they proposed and create the consistency and root n asymptotic normality of the two estimators.

- "Causality, Prediction, and Specification Analysis: Recent Advances and Future Directions" (2014)

This paper is written by Xiaohong Chen and Norman R. Swanson to salute and honor Hal White's great achievements in the field of both theoretical econometrics and empirical economics. Chen and Swanson discuss some articles in this paper, including "A Two-Stage Procedure for Partially Identified Models" from Kaido and White, "Testing for Separability in Structural Equations" from Lu and White, "Testing Conditional Independence via Empirical Likelihood" from Su and White, and so on.

==== Other selected research ====
- Carroll, R. J., Chen, X., & Hu, Y. (2010). Identification and estimation of nonlinear models using two samples with nonclassical measurement errors. Journal of Nonparametric Statistics, 22(4), 419-423.
- Chen, X., & Christensen, T. M. (2015). Optimal Sup-norm Rates and Uniform Inference on Nonlinear Functionals of Nonparametric IV Regression. Quantitative Economics, 9, 39-84.
- Chen, X., & Fan, Y. (2006). Estimation of copula-based semiparametric time series models. Journal of Econometrics, 130(2), 307-335.
- Chen, X., & Gao, F. (2017). A Reverse Gaussian Correlation Inequality by Adding Cones. Statistics & Probability Letters, 123, 84-87.
- Chen, X., Jacho-Chávez, D. T., & Linton, O. (2016). Averaging of an Increasing Number of Moment Condition Estimators. Econometric Theory, 32, 30-70.
- Chen, X., Linton, O., & Yi, Y. (2017). Semiparametric Identification of the Bid-Ask Spread in Extended Roll Models. Journal of Econometrics, 200, 312-325.
- Chen, X., Linton, O., Schneeberger, S., & Yi, Y. (2019). Semiparametric estimation of the bid–ask spread in extended roll models. Journal of Econometrics, 208(1), 160-178.
- Chen, X., & Ludvigson, S. (2009). Land of Addicts? An Empirical Investigation of Habit-Based Asset Pricing Behavior. Journal of Applied Econometrics, 24, 1057-1093.
- Chen, X., & Qiu, Y. J. (2016). Methods for Nonparametric and Semiparametric Regressions with Endogeneity: A Gentle Guide. SSRN Electronic Journal, 2016(8), 259-290.
- Chen, X., & Santos, A. (2018). Overidentification in Regular Models. Econometrica, 86(5), 1771-1817.
- Chen, X., Shao, Q., Wu, W. B., & Xu, L. (2016). Self-normalized Cramér-type moderate deviations under dependence. The Annals of Statistics, 44, 1593-1617.
- Tamer, E., Christensen, T. M., & Chen, X. (2018). Monte Carlo confidence sets for identified sets. Econometrica, 86(6), 1965-2018.

== Awards and honors ==
In 2017, Chen and fellow economist Gregory C. Chow were awarded the China Economics Prize by the National Economics Foundation for their "outstanding contributions on theoretical econometric research".

- 2013.5-2016.5 National Thousand-Expert Talent Program B ("Qian Ren Ji Hua" Plan B), China
- 2012 Econometric Theory Multa Scripsit Award
- 2010 The winner of The Journal of Nonparametric Statistics 2010 Best Paper Award
- 2008 & 2009 The winner of The Richard Stone Prize in Applied Econometrics
- 2006 & 2007 The winner of The Arnold Zellner Award
