= Soo Hong Chew =

Singaporean economist

Chew Soo Hong
- Born: 26 April 1954 (age 72); Singapore

Academic background
- Education: Claremont Graduate University (MA 1977) University of British Columbia (PhD 1981)

Academic work
- Discipline: Decision theory, Behavioral economics, Experimental economics, Biological economics
- Institutions: National University of Singapore (2009-present); Hong Kong University of Science and Technology (1998-2009); University of California, Irvine (1991-1999); Johns Hopkins University (1984-1991); University of Arizona (1980-1984)
- Website: Information at IDEAS / RePEc

Chew Soo Hong (born 26 April 1954) is a Singaporean economist who is professor at the National University of Singapore and an adjunct professor at the Hong Kong University of Science and Technology. He is considered one of the pioneers in axiomatic non-expected utility models.

== Biography ==
Chew was born on 26 April 1954 in Singapore. In 1975, he received a Full Technological Certificate in Telecommunications from the City and Guilds of London Institute and graduated by distance learning with a major in Mathematics from the University of London, while in 1976, he graduated with a major in Physics from the Harvey Mudd College. Chew obtained his MA in Mathematics from the Claremont Graduate School in 1977 and his PhD in Interdisciplinary Studies from the University of British Columbia in 1981. He worked as an assistant professor at the University of Arizona from 1980 to 1984 and the Johns Hopkins University from 1984 to 1991 before moving to the University of California, Irvine, where he was associate professor from 1991 to 1995 and professor from 1995 to 1999, and the Hong Kong University of Science and Technology, where he was Professor from 1998 to 2005 and Chair Professor from 2005 to 2009. During his spell at the Hong Kong University of Science and Technology, he directed the university's centre for Experimental Business Research, inaugurated by Vernon L. Smith in 1998. Chew has been Professor and Provost Chair at the National University of Singapore since 2009, and is co-director of the university's laboratory for Behavioral x Biological Economics and the Social Sciences.

Chew was awarded the Leonard J. Savage Award by the International Society for Bayesian Analysis and the Best Theoretical Research Paper Award by the Decision Sciences Institute both in 1982. He is member of the American Economic Association and has been fellow of the Econometric Society since 2012.

His research interests cover the fields of decision theory, behavioral economics, biological economics and experimental economics.

== Selected publications ==
- Chew, S. H. (1983). "A generalization of the quasilinear mean with applications to the measurement of income inequality and decision theory resolving the Allais paradox". Econometrica, 51 (4), pp. 1065–1092.
- Chew, S. H.; Karni, E. & Z. Safra (1987). "Risk-Aversion in the theory of expected utility with rank dependent probabilities". Journal of Economic Theory, 42 (2), pp. 370–381.
- Chew, S. H.; Epstein, L. G. & U. Segal (1991). "Mixture symmetry and quadratic utility". Econometrica, 59 (1), pp. 139–163.
- Chew, S. H. & J. S. Sagi (2008). "Small worlds: Modeling attitudes toward sources of uncertainty". Journal of Economic Theory, 139 (1), pp.
- Ebstein, R. P.; Israel, S.; Chew, S. H.; Zhong, S. & A. Knafo (2010). "Genetics of human social behavior". Neuron, 65 (6), pp. 831–844.
