= Alan Deardorff =

American economist (born 1944)

Alan V. Deardorff
- Born: 1944 (age 81–82); United States
- Occupation: Economist
- Known for: International trade

Academic background
- Doctoral advisor: Jaroslav Vaněk

Academic work
- Doctoral students: Robert W. Staiger
- Website: public.websites.umich.edu/~alandear/

Alan V. Deardorff (born 1944) is the John W. Sweetland Professor Emeritus of International Economics and a professor emeritus of Public Policy at the University of Michigan Gerald R. Ford School of Public Policy, Ann Arbor.

== Education ==
Deardorff received his Ph.D. in economics from Cornell University in 1971.

== Career ==
Deardorff is the author of Deardorffs' Glossary of International Economics, as well as the Family Tree of Trade Economists. He has undertaken work on David Ricardo's theory of comparative advantage, arguing that "the law of comparative advantage breaks down when applied to individual commodities or pairs of commodities in a many-commodity world", but stating that "the law is nonetheless valid if restated in terms of averages across all commodities". He has also served as a consultant to international organizations including the Organization for Economic Cooperation and Development and the World Bank.

== Current affiliations ==
- Asia-Pacific Research and Training Network on Trade (ARTNeT), United Nations Economic and Social Commission for Asia and the Pacific,
- External Fellow, Leverhulme Centre for Research on Globalisation and Economic Policy, University of Nottingham.
- External Fellow, National Bureau of Economic Research
- Faculty Associate, William Davidson Institute, University of Michigan
- International Research Fellow and Permanent Advisor, Kiel Institute of World Economics
- Member, Academic Council, VRCenter DEGIT, Institute for World Economics, Kiel University
- Member, American Economic Association
- Member, Board of Editors, North American Journal of Economics and Finance
- Member, Editorial Advisory Board, International Economic Journal
- Member, Editorial Advisory Board, The World Economy
- Member, Editorial Board, Journal of Economic Integration
- Member, Editorial Board, Journal of International Economic Law
- Member, Editorial Board, Studies in International Economics, University of Michigan Press
- Member, Group of Eminent Persons on Non-tariff Barriers, United Nations Conference on Trade and Development
