= Martin Hellwig =

German economist (born 1949)

Martin F. Hellwig
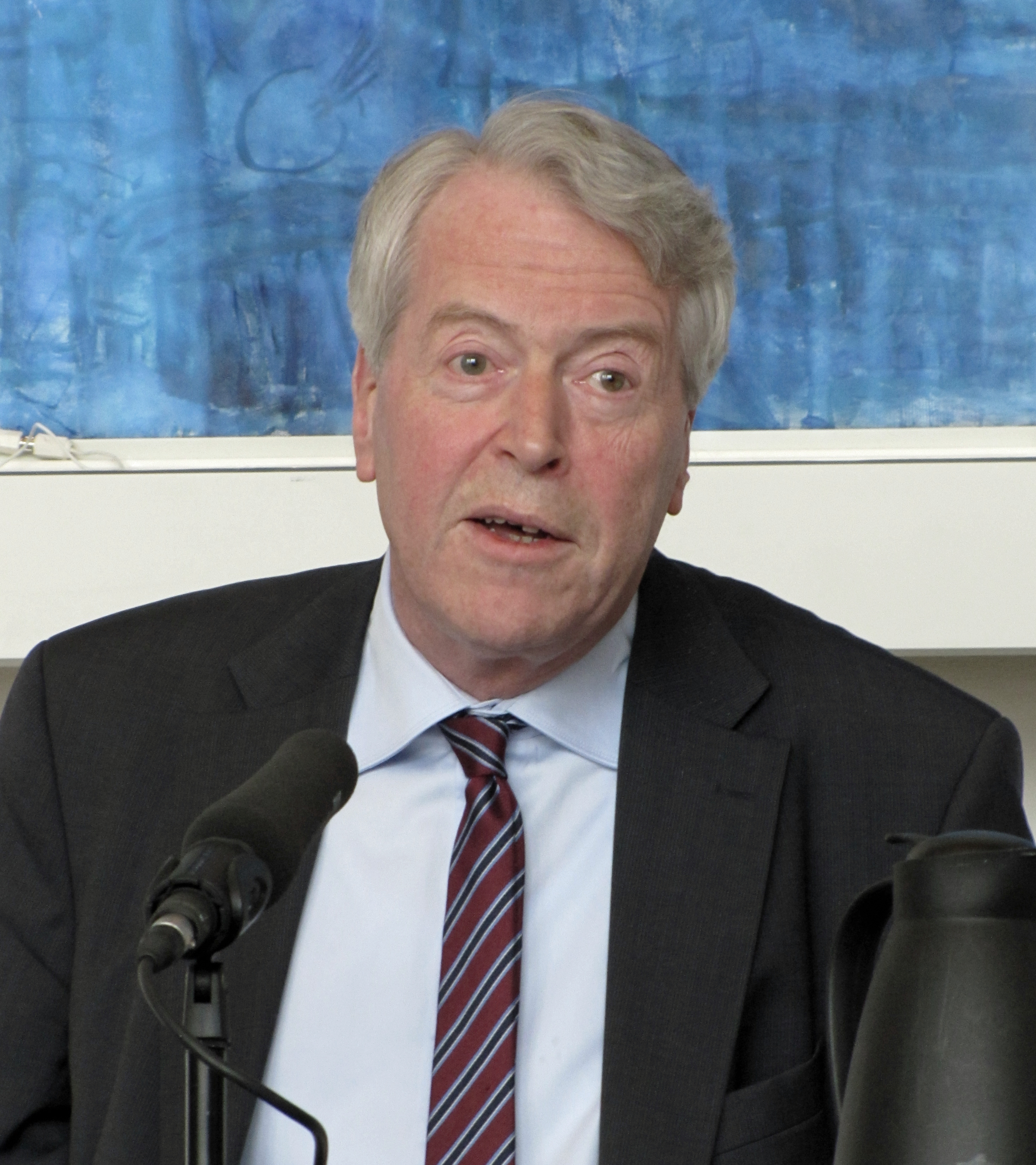
- Hellwig in 2016
- Born: 5 April 1949 (age 77); Düsseldorf, Germany

Academic background
- Education: University of Heidelberg; MIT
- Thesis: Sequential models in economic dynamics (1973)
- Doctoral advisor: Peter Diamond

Academic work
- Discipline: Political economics, Monetary economics
- Institutions: Princeton University; University of Bonn; University of Basel; University of Mannheim; Max Planck Institute for Research on Collective Goods
- Website: Information at IDEAS / RePEc

Martin Friedrich Hellwig (born 5 April 1949) is a German economist. He has been the director of the Max Planck Institute for Research on Collective Goods from 2004 to 2017. Between 2000 and 2004, he was the head of the German Monopolkommission.

== Education and career ==
Hellwig studied economics at the University of Heidelberg, where he received his diploma in 1970. He completed his Ph.D. in economics under Peter Diamond at Massachusetts Institute of Technology. From 1974 to 1977, Hellwig was an assistant professor of economics at Princeton University. He then returned to Germany as Associate Professor of Economics at the University of Bonn from 1977 to 1979, becoming a full Professor of Economics there from 1979 to 1987. He subsequently held a professorship at the University of Basel from 1987 to 1996. From 1996 to 2004, he was Professor of Economics at the University of Mannheim.

During his time in Basel, Hellwig also held visiting positions including the Bogen Visiting Professorship at Hebrew University of Jerusalem in 1994 and the Taussig Research Professorship at Harvard University from 1995 to 1996.

== Work ==
For many years, Hellwig was one of the most prolific and influential German economists in terms of research. In 2009, Frankfurter Allgemeine Zeitung author Gerald Braunberger described him as "perhaps the most respected German economist." He is listed in the American "Who's Who in Economics." On May 1, 2011, Hellwig became Chairman of the European Systemic Risk Board. As of July 2018, he is one of its two vice-chairmen.

His book, co-authored with Anat R. Admati, *The Bankers' New Clothes*, on the necessity and possibilities of stricter bank regulation, was positively received: Gerald Braunberger called it a "masterpiece."

== Honors and awards ==
Hellwig is a fellow of the European Economic Association and the Econometric Society. Since 1990, he was an elected member of the Academia Europaea. In 2002, he became the inaugural fellow of the European Corporate Governance Institute.

== Selected publications ==
- Blum, Jürg; Hellwig, Martin (1995). "The macroeconomic implications of capital adequacy requirements for banks". European Economic Review. 39 (3–4): 739–749. doi:10.1016/0014-2921(94)00081-A.
- Pissarides, Christopher; Layard, Richard; Hellwig, Martin (1986). "Unemployment and Vacancies in Britain". Economic Policy. 1 (3): 500–559. doi:10.2307/1344583. ISSN 0266-4658.
- Gale, Douglas; Hellwig, Martin (1985). "Incentive-Compatible Debt Contracts: The One-Period Problem". The Review of Economic Studies. 52 (4): 647–663. doi:10.2307/2297737. ISSN 0034-6527.
