= Jonathan Eaton =

American economist

Jonathan Eaton (May 27, 1950 – February 9, 2024) was a leading international economist, as of 2017 a distinguished professor at Pennsylvania State University. He graduated from Harvard College in 1972. He earned his M.A. in economics from Yale University in 1973 and his Ph.D. from Yale in 1976. Awards he has received include The Frisch Medal (with Samuel Kortum), awarded 2004, The Ohlin Lecture, 2013, and The Onassis Prize in International Trade (with Samuel Kortum), 2018.

== Selected publications ==
- "Unbalanced Trade." With Robert Dekle, and Samuel Kortum. 2007. American Economic Review, 97 (2): 351–355.
- "Cities And Growth: Theory And Evidence From France And Japan." With Zvi Ecksteina, 1995.
- "Sovereign Debt, Reputation and Credit Terms." With Raquel Fernandez, 1995. International Journal of Finance & Economics, John Wiley & Sons.
