= Assaf Razin =

Israeli economist, academic and author (1941–2026)

- אסף רזין
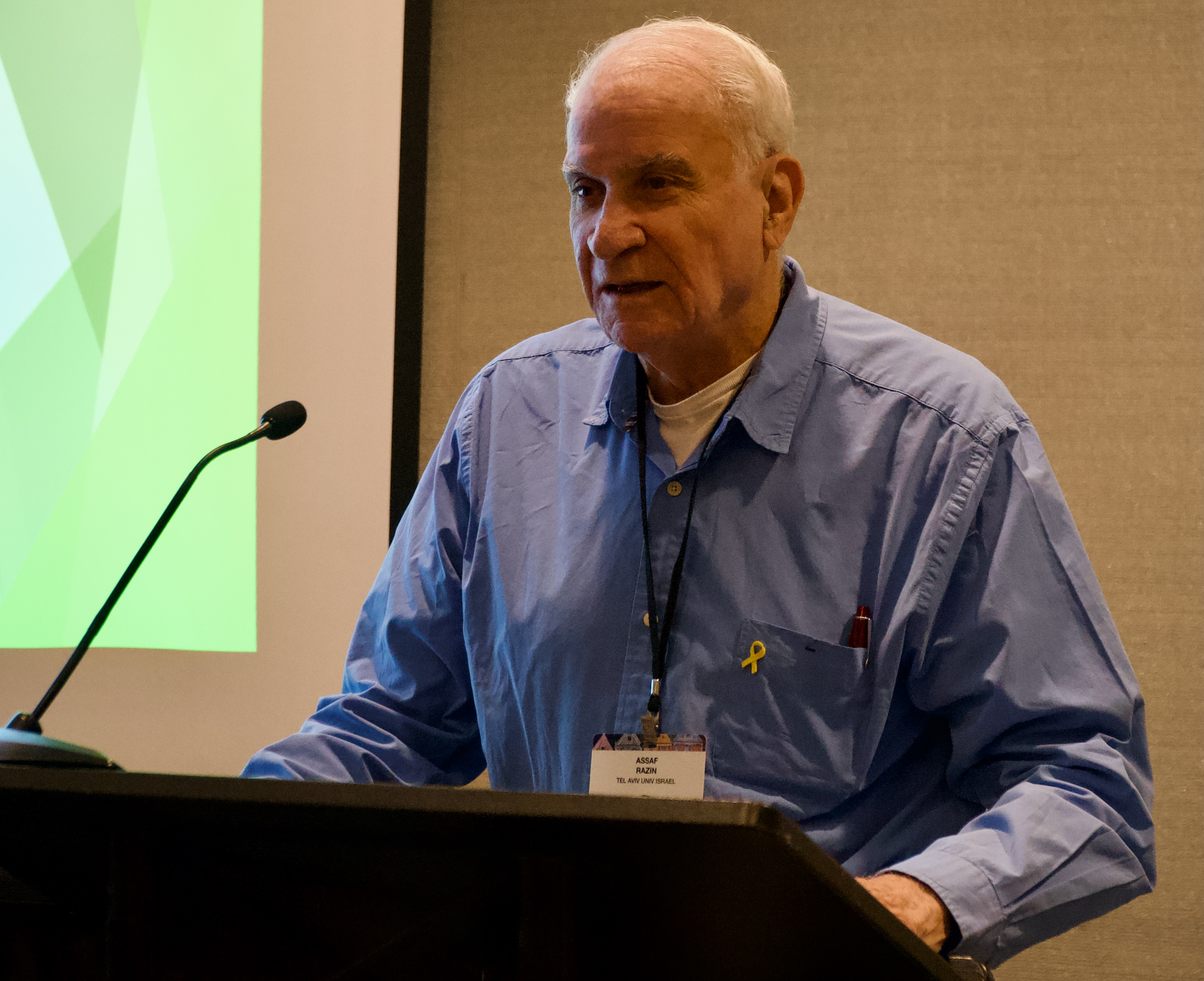
- Razin in 2025
- Born: 1941; Shamir, Mandatory Palestine
- Died: 9 July 2026 (aged 85)
- Occupations: Economist; academic; author
- Board member of: First International Bank of Israel; Gan-Shmuel Foods
- Spouse: Shula Razin
- Awards: Fellow of the Econometric Society (1994); EMET Prize (2017)

Academic background
- Education: University of Chicago
- Thesis: Investment in Human Capital and Economic Growth (1972)

Academic work
- Discipline: Economics
- Sub-discipline: International economics; Public economics
- Institutions: Tel Aviv University; Cornell University
- Notable works: Israel and the World Economy; Fiscal Policies and the World Economy; A Theory of International Trade under Uncertainty; Understanding Global Crises: An Emerging Paradigm; The Decline of the Welfare State: Aging, and Globalization
- Website: Official site

Assaf Razin (1941 – 9 July 2026) was an Israeli international economist, academic and author. He was a professor emeritus at Tel Aviv University, and former professor of International Economics at Cornell University.

Razin was known for his works on international economics and public economics. He has contributed to top scientific journals like the American Economic Review, Journal of Monetary Economics and the Journal of Political Economy, and has written the books International Taxation, Fiscal Policies and Growth in the World Economy, Population Economics, Israel and the World Economy: Power of Globalization, and Globalization, and Transition to Illiberal Democracy: Economic Drivers and Consequences.

He was the recipient of the 2017 EMET Prize in Economics and the 2025 lifetime achievement award given by the Israel Economic Society. He was a fellow of the Econometric Society.

== Early life and education ==
Razin's parents arrived in Israel in the late 1930s from Bessarabia in pre-WWII war Romania (now Moldova and Ukraine). They founded Kibbutz Shamir. He was born and raised in Kibbutz Shamir, on the slopes of the Golan Heights. Razin studied undergraduate economics at the Hebrew University. After being admitted to graduate studies at the University of Chicago, he completed a PhD in Economics there in 1969.

== Career ==
Razin's first academic job was at the Economics Department of the University of Minnesota, as an assistant professor. A year later, he joined Tel Aviv University. From 2008 until his death in 2026, he was a professor emeritus at Tel-Aviv University. From 2000 to 2015 he held the position of the Friedman Professor of International Economics at Cornell University.

Razin was the chair of the Department of Economics at Tel Aviv University from 1974 to 1976. Subsequently, he held the position of dean of the Faculty of Social Sciences at Tel Aviv University from 1981 to 1986, and deputy rector in the early 1990s. Among Razin's policy-making engagements, he served in the late 1970s as the chief economic adviser to the Israeli government. He held advisory appointments at the World Bank, International Monetary Fund, Bank of England, and European Central Bank.

== Books ==
In 1978, he co-authored the book A Theory of International Trade Under Uncertainty with Elhanan Helpman. The book explored how the basic theories of international trade are extended and revised in the presence of uncertainty and risk-sharing financial institutions. In 1987, he co-authored a book with Jacob A. Frenkel, Fiscal Policies in the World Economy. The book provided an intertemporal-based analysis of fiscal policies and their effects on economic growth in the global context, integrating traditional and modern approaches in open economy macroeconomics and public economics, with a focus on topics such as government spending, budget deficits, international taxation, and economic convergence across countries.

Razin's books on the Israeli economy, The Economy of Modern Israel: Malaise and Promise (1993), and Israel and the World Economy: The Power of Globalization (2018), explore the effects of immigration, building of economic institutions, technological advancement, and controlling inflation generated the "economic miracle" whereby Israel transformed from a low-income agricultural economy into a fully advanced economy.

He co-authored with Jacob Frenkel and Efraim Sadka International Economics, which provides analytical theory for the international ramifications of income and value-added taxation, and with Efraim Sadka, the book Population Economics, The latter explored the evolution of economic theories (such as Malthusian and Becker theories on population growth, focusing on microeconomic factors like fertility decisions, labor supply, and intergenerational transfers, and their implications for economic policy and social issues). He also authored Labor, Capital, and Finance: International Flows. The book integrated disparate elements of economics into a unified framework, focusing on capital, labor, and finance within globalization. In his 2011 book, he examined the interplay between immigration policies, welfare states, and economic dynamics, considering factors such as skill and age composition of immigrants, fiscal burdens, and the implications for both host and source countries, particularly focusing on Europe and developed nations. His book Understanding Global Crises offers a comprehensive analysis of various global financial crises, integrating common and disparate threads into an empirically testable analytical framework while exploring developments in the New Keynesian analytical framework post-2008. His more recent book Globalization, Migration, and Welfare State: Macroeconomic Trifecta explores the intricate interplay between globalization, migration, and the welfare state. Recently, Razin put out the e-book The Transition to Illiberal Democracy Economic Drivers and Consequences. The book unveils the insidious mechanisms employed by autocratic regimes to consolidate power and their consequences, from economic fault lines such as education gaps and identity politics, laying on religion and demography, to judicial overhaul, weakened growth, the emergence of de facto power, media manipulation, faltering foreign investment, and distortion of financial stability.

== Research ==
Razin's research covers various aspects of international economics. He explored how trade balances evolve in response to economic policies, exchange rate movements, and global economic conditions.

He analyzed the impact of fiscal policies on macroeconomic stability, particularly in open economies. His research studies indicate how government borrowing and spending affect national and global economic performance. Razin's early research established a link between population theory and economic growth theory by analyzing an intergenerational model of optimum population growth, considering factors such as the quality of life for new populations, consumption levels, public support for investment in children, intergenerational differences in preferences, and uncertainty in population changes. His 1983 collaborative research with LEO Svensson and others analyzed the impact of terms-of-trade changes on a small country's spending and current account under perfect international capital mobility and an intertemporal framework, considering both temporary and permanent fluctuations and the influence of individuals' time preferences on trade balance outcomes. In his 1986 study, he employed a two-country general equilibrium model to analyze the effects of budget deficits and government spending on global interest rates, consumption, and international indebtedness, exploring the differences between fiscal expenditures and tax cuts, current versus expected future policies, and the welfare implications of budget deficits.

Razin's 1991 research examined global capital income taxation and tax competition, showing that coordinated policies reduce the need for tax harmonization, whereas insufficient coordination results in lower capital taxes and burdens on immobile factors, limiting effective tax tools. In 1994, he proposed a method to compute effective tax rates using national accounts and revenue data, highlighting international differences in tax policy and demonstrating the consistency of these rates with general equilibrium economic frameworks. His 2000 study investigated factors influencing large adjustments in current account deficits and exchange rates in low- and middle-income countries, distinguishing between triggers of currency crises and current account reversals, finding that domestic and external factors play key roles with different economic impacts. In 2006, he developed a theoretical model explaining how information asymmetry influences the choice between foreign direct investments (FDI) and foreign portfolio investments (FPI), highlighting how investors' information advantages impact investment decisions, resale prices, and the observed patterns of investment flows across developed and developing countries. While exploring how welfare state generosity affects migration rates, his 2015 study found that within free labor movement areas like the EU, welfare states attract skilled migrants, while in restricted migration contexts, they may draw unskilled migrants, potentially increasing fiscal burdens. In 2022, he published a work showing a nuanced analysis of how income-based globalization attitudes interact with national government policies, shedding light on the complex relationship between economic interests, trade dynamics, and welfare-state outcomes in the context of a globalized economy.

== Personal life and death ==
Razin was married to Shula Razin. They had three children. He died on 9 July 2026, at the age of 85.

== Awards and honors ==
- 1994 – Fellow of the Econometric Society
- 2017 – EMET Prize in Economics
- 2022 – Fellow, International Economic Association
- 2024 – Named a 2024 Top Scholar by ScholarGPS
- 2025 – Lifetime Achievement Award, presented by Israel Economic Association

== Bibliography ==
=== Selected books ===
- A Theory of International Trade Under Uncertainty
- International Taxation in an Integrated World
- Population Economics
- Current Account Sustainability
- Fiscal Policies in the World Economy
- The Economy of Modern Israel: Malaise and Promise
- Israel and the World Economy: The Power of Globalization
- Labor, Capital, and Finance: International Flows (2001) ISBN 9780521785570
- Understanding Global Crises: An Emerging Paradigm (2014) ISBN 9780262028592

=== Selected articles ===
- Razin, A. (1973), Optimum investment in human capital, The Review of Economic Studies 39 (4), 455–460
- Razin, A and U. Ben-Zion, (1974), An intergenerational model of population growth, The American Economic Review 65 (5), 923–933
- Helpman, E. and A. Razin, (1978), Uncertainty and International Trade in the Presence of Stock Markets, Review of Economic Studies 45(2): 239–50
- Razin, A. and E. Sadka (2001), The aging population and the size of the welfare state, Journal of Political Economy 110 (4), 900–918
- Svensson, L. E., & Razin, A. (1983), The terms of trade and the current account: The Harberger-Laursen-Metzler effect. Journal of political Economy, 91(1), 97–125
- Frenkel, J. A., & Razin, A. (1986), Fiscal policies in the world economy. Journal of Political Economy, 94(3, Part 1), 564–594
- Helpman, E., & Assaf Razin (1987), Exchange Rate Management: Intertemporal Tradeoffs, The American Economic Review 77, No. 1, 107–123
- Razin, A., & Sadka, E. (1991), International tax competition and gains from tax harmonization. Economics Letters, 37(1), 69–76
- Mendoza, E. G., Razin, A., & Tesar, L. L. (1994), Effective tax rates in macroeconomics: Cross-country estimates of tax rates on factor incomes and consumption. Journal of Monetary Economics, 34(3), 297–323
- Razin, A. and J. Whaba, (2014), Welfare Magnet Hypothesis, Fiscal Burden and Immigration Skill-Selectivity, Scandinavian Journal of Economics
- Loungani, P., & Razin, A. (2001), How beneficial is foreign direct investment for developing countries? Finance and development, 38(2), 6–9*
