= Cristina Arellano =

American economist

Cristina Arellano (born 1976) is an Ecuadorian-American economist who works as a monetary advisor to the Federal Reserve Bank of Minneapolis, where she is assistant director of policy. She also holds an adjunct faculty position at the University of Minnesota. Her publications and research concern international macroeconomics, including fiscal policy, government debts, and business cycles.

== Education and career ==
Arellano is originally from Quito in Ecuador, where she was born in 1976. Emigrating to the United States, she majored in economics at Indiana University South Bend, graduating in 1999. She continued her studies at Duke University, where she completed her Ph.D. in 2004. Her dissertation, International debt in emerging economies, was supervised by Enrique G. Mendoza.

She joined the University of Minnesota as an assistant professor of economics in 2004. In 2009 she moved to the Federal Reserve Bank of Minneapolis as a senior economist, continuing to hold an adjunct position at the University of Minnesota. She has been monetary advisor to the Federal Reserve Bank of Minneapolis since 2016.

She was a research fellow of the National Bureau of Economic Research from 2009 to 2021, and since 2016 has been a research fellow of the Centre for Economic Policy Research. Her research has been published in economics journals, such as American Economic Review and the Journal of Political Economy.

== Recognition ==
Arellano became a Fellow of the Econometric Society in 2024.

Arellano was elected to the Council of the Econometric Society in 2025.
