= Víctor Aguirre-Torres =

Mexican econometrician (born 1954)

- Born: 1954 (age 71–72)
- Education: North Carolina State University; Instituto Politécnico Nacional
- Scientific career
- Fields: Statistics, econometrics, design of experiments, reliability
- Institutions: Instituto Tecnológico Autónomo de México
- Doctoral advisor: A. Ronald Gallant

Victor M. A. Aguirre-Torres is an internationally recognized econometrician, professor and researcher of the Academic Department of Statistics at the Instituto Tecnológico Autónomo de México (ITAM). He is a member of the Mexican Academy of Sciences (Academia Mexicana de Ciencias). Since 1991, he has formed a significant number of leaders in México, with nearly 46 generations to his credit.

Besides his family, he has a passion for teaching and research in statistics and econometrics. He has over 33 publications in research journals and 23 distinctions, among which stand out, those obtained as the Best Paper Award of The 2009 International Conference of Computational Statistics and Data Engineering, in London, England;. He has been a member of the National Accreditation Board of Research (SNI), area of Physics and Mathematics, since 1988.

In 1982, he received the Ph.D. degree in Statistics from North Carolina State University (NCSU). Before that he obtained a Master of Statistics from NCSU and a Master of Science in mathematics from the National Polytechnic Institute, Mexico City. His alma mater is the National Polytechnic Institute, Mexico City, where he earned a Physics and Mathematics degree.

He has given more than 33 international seminars and has been invited to over 32 talks and 47 contributed talks.

Among his achievements, he was leader in the creation of the Statistics Group at the Center for Research in Mathematics in Guanajuato (CIMAT).

== Awards ==
Elected member of the National Accreditation Board of Research (SNI), level 2. Area of Physics and Mathematics for the periods: 2014-2018 and 2010–2013.

Best Paper Award of The 2009 International Conference of Computational Statistics and Data Engineering. London, England. 2009

Elected member of the National Accreditation Board of Research (SNI), level 1. Area of Physics and Mathematics for the periods: 2006–2009, 2002–2005, 1999–2001, 1996–1999, 1988–1991.

Outstanding Academic Performance Award, ITAM in the years: 1997, 1996, 1994, 1993, 1992, 1991.

Outstanding Academic Performance, Continuing Education, ITAM 2000.

Mexico's National University Recognition for Coordinating the Masters Program in Statistics and OR. 1997.

Elected member of the National Accreditation Board of Research (SNI), level Candidate. Area of Physics and Mathematics, 1985–1988.

Elected member of Phi-Kappa-Phi Honor Society Mathematics, NCSU Chapter, USA.

Elected Gertrude M. Cox Fellow, Statistics Department, NCSU, USA.

Mexico's National Science Foundation Scholarship for Doctoral Studies, 1979–1982.

Elected Best Math Student of the National Polytechnic Institute, Mexican Institute of Culture, 1977.
