= Wolfgang Pesendorfer =

American economist

- Born: 1963 (age 62–63)

Academic background
- Education: University of California, Los Angeles
- Doctoral advisor: Joseph M. Ostroy

Academic work
- Discipline: choice theory game theory
- Institutions: Princeton University
- Doctoral students: Nicola Persico
- Website: Information at IDEAS / RePEc

Wolfgang Pesendorfer (born 1963) is a professor of economics at Princeton University. He specializes in choice theory, game theory, and political economy.

== Selected works ==
- Faruk Gul and Wolfgang Pesendorfer, Temptation and Self-Control, Econometrica 2001.
- Faruk Gul and Wolfgang Pesendorfer, Self-Control and the Theory of Consumption, Econometrica 2004.
- Faruk Gul and Wolfgang Pesendorfer, Random Expected Utility, Econometrica 2006.
