= A. Ronald Gallant =

American econometrician

- Born: 1942 (age 83–84)
- Education: Iowa State University; University of California, Los Angeles; San Diego State University
- Scientific career
- Fields: Statistics, econometrics
- Workplaces: Pennsylvania State University
- Doctoral advisor: Wayne Fuller
- Doctoral students: Víctor Aguirre-Torres

A. Ronald "Ron" Gallant is a leading American econometrician. Gallant is a professor of economics and a liberal arts research professor at the Pennsylvania State University.

Prior to joining the Penn State faculty he was the Hanes Corporation Foundation Professor of Business Administration, Fuqua School of Business, Duke University, with a secondary appointment in the Department of Economics, Duke University, as well as a Distinguished Scientist in Residence, Department of Economics, New York University, both in the United States.

He is also adjunct professor, Department of Statistics, University of North Carolina at Chapel Hill. Before joining the Duke faculty, he was Henry A. Latane Distinguished Professor of Economics at the University of North Carolina at Chapel Hill. He retains emeritus status at UNC. Previously he was, successively, Assistant, Associate, Full, and Drexel Professor of Statistics and Economics at North Carolina State University.

He received his A.B. in mathematics from San Diego State University, his M.B.A. in marketing from UCLA, and his Ph.D. in statistics from Iowa State University.

He is a Fellow of both the Econometrics Society and the American Statistical Association. He serves on the board of directors of the National Bureau of Economic Research and has served on the board of directors of the American Statistical Association and on the board of trustees of the National Institute of Statistical Sciences. He is co-editor of the Journal of Econometrics and past editor of The Journal of Business and Economic Statistics.

In collaboration with George Tauchen of Duke University, Gallant developed the Efficient Method of Moments (EMM). He is one of the leaders in nonlinear time series analysis, nonlinear econometrics, nonlinear dynamic systems, and in econometrics theory.
