= Uta Schönberg =

German economist

Uta Schönberg is a German economist specializing in labor economics and microeconomics, including wage structures in Germany and elsewhere, and the effects of immigration, education, and family policy on labor. She is chair of economics at the University of Hong Kong, on leave as professor of economics at University College London, and a research fellow of the IZA Institute of Labor Economics and the Institut für Arbeitsmarkt- und Berufsforschung.

== Education and career ==
Schönberg studied economics at the University of Hanover, earning a diploma (the German equivalent of a master's degree) in 1998. She completed a Ph.D. at University College London in 2004.

She worked as an assistant professor at the University of Rochester in the US from 2003 to 2008. She was also a research affiliate of the IZA Institute of Labor Economics from 2003 until 2005, when she became a research fellow of the institute. In 2008, she joined the Institut für Arbeitsmarkt- und Berufsforschung (IAB, the Nuremberg Institute for Employment Research), and returned to University College London as a lecturer, where she was promoted to reader in 2011 and professor in 2014. She has been chair of economics at the University of Hong Kong since 2023.

== Recognition ==
Schönberg received the Philip Leverhulme Prize in 2016.

She is a Fellow of the British Academy, elected in 2022. She was named as a Fellow of the Society of Labor Economists and a Fellow of the Econometric Society in 2023.
