= Ayşe İmrohoroğlu =

Turkish economist

- Born: c. 1959

Academic background
- Education: Middle East Technical University (BS 1980) University of Minnesota (PhD 1988)
- Doctoral advisor: Edward C. Prescott

Academic work
- Discipline: Macroeconomics, Game theory, Behavioral sciences
- Institutions: USC Marshall School of Business (1989-present)
- Website: Information at IDEAS / RePEc

Ayşe İmrohoroğlu (born c. 1959) is a Turkish economist who is Professor of Finance and Business Economics at the USC Marshall School of Business.

== Education and career ==
İmrohoroğlu obtained her BS in economics from the Middle East Technical University in 1980 and PhD from the University of Minnesota in 1988 with a dissertation titled "Aggregate Implications of Liquidity Constraints" under the advisory of Edward C. Prescott. She joined the USC Marshall School of Business in 1989 as an assistant professor of Finance and Business Economics, got appointed as an associate professor of Finance and Business Economics in 1994 and has been a professor of Finance and Business Economics since 2000. She was also Chair of the Department of Finance and Business Economics from 2004 to 2007.

== Research ==
Her research interests include business cycles, inflation, unemployment insurance and social security. İmrohoroğlu received a grant from the National Science Foundation in 1992 to investigate the effects of social security programmes on economies with imperfect insurance. She served as an Associate Editor (2005–2012) and as an Editor (2012–2017) of European Economic Review. She was also an economic advisor to the Central Bank of the Republic of Turkey from 2013 to 2015.

== Recognition ==
She was named as a Fellow of the Econometric Society in 2024.

== Personal life ==
She is married to the fellow Turkish economist at the USC Marshall School of Business Selahattin İmrohoroğlu.

== Selected publications ==
Journal articles

- İmrohoroğlu, A. (1989). "Cost of business cycles with indivisibilities and liquidity constraints". Journal of Political Economy, 97 (6), pp. 1364–1383.
- İmrohoroğlu, A. & G. D. Hansen (1992). "The role of unemployment insurance in an economy with liquidity constraints and moral hazard". Journal of Political Economy, 100 (1), pp. 118–142.
- İmrohoroğlu, A.; İmrohoroğlu, S. & D. H. Joines (1995). "A life cycle analysis of social security". Economic Theory, 6 (1), pp. 83–114.
- İmrohoroğlu, A.; İmrohoroğlu, S. & D. H. Joines (1998). "The effect of tax-favored retirement accounts on capital accumulation". American Economic Review, 88 (4), pp. 749–768.
- İmrohoroğlu, A.; İmrohoroğlu, S. & D. H. Joines (2003). "Time-inconsistent preferences and social security". The Quarterly Journal of Economics, 118 (2), pp. 745–784.
- Fuster, L.; İmrohoroğlu, A. & S. İmrohoroğlu (2007). "Elimination of social security in a dynastic framework". The Review of Economic Studies, 74 (1), pp. 113–145.
- Baccara, M.; İmrohoroğlu, A.; Wilson, A. J. & L. Yariv (2012). "A field study on matching with network externalities". American Economic Review, 102 (5), pp. 1773–1804.

Books

- İmrohoroğlu, A. & İmrohoroğlu, S. (2012). The Fiscal Cliff: How America Can Avoid a Fall And Stay On Top. Ending Spending. ISBN 978-0985625511.
