= Ivana Komunjer =

Croatian-American economist

Ivana Komunjer is a professor of economics at Georgetown University. Her research concerns finance and econometrics, including work on international trade and economic forecasting.

== Education and career ==
Komunjer is originally from Zagreb, then part of Yugoslavia and now in Croatia. When she was a teenager, her parents (a chemist and a physicist) took research fellowships in Paris, and she moved with them, intending to return after one or two years. Instead, the outbreak of the Yugoslav Wars led Komunjer and her family to remain in Paris.

She was educated as a foreign student in France, initially intending to go into physics. A chance encounter with a French researcher in econophysics led her to shift her interests, from physics to economics. She received a bachelor's degree in economics and physics from the École polytechnique in 1997, a master's degree in 1998 through the Département et Laboratoire d'Économie Théorique Appliquée (DELTA) of the École normale supérieure (Paris), and a Ph.D. in finance in 2002 from HEC Paris. Her doctoral studies included work as a visiting scholar at the University of California, San Diego, through which she became interested in econometrics. Her doctoral dissertation, Trois essais d'économie financière, was directed by G. Michael Rockinger.

She joined the California Institute of Technology as an assistant professor of economics in 2002, and moved to the University of California, San Diego in 2005. There, she was promoted to associate professor in 2009 and full professor in 2016. She moved to her present position at Georgetown University in 2017.

== Recognition ==
Komunjer was elected as a Fellow of the International Association for Applied Econometrics in 2017, and as a Fellow of the Econometric Society in 2025.
