= Pauline Grosjean =

French historian of economics

Pauline Anne Mathilde Grosjean is a French economist and historian of economics focusing on political economy, the effects of cultural factors including gender norms on economic development, and the economic factors behind ongoing gender inequality. She works in Australia as a professor of economics at the University of New South Wales.

== Education and career ==
Grosjean earned a bachelor's degree in economics in 1998 from Paris Nanterre University, master's degrees (M.A.) in economics and finance in 2001 from the École normale supérieure Paris-Saclay, an agrégation in 2001, an M.Phil. in 2003 from the Toulouse School of Economics, and a Ph.D. in 2006 from the Toulouse School of Economics, supervised by Paul Seabright.

After working for a year at the European Bank for Reconstruction and Development in London, and two more years as a post-doctoral researcher at the University of California Berkeley, she became an assistant professor of economics at the University of San Francisco in 2009. She moved to the University of New South Wales in Australia in 2011, as a senior lecturer. She became an associate professor in 2015 and full professor in 2018.

== Book ==
Grosjean is the author of Patriarcapitalisme: En finir avec les inégalités femmes/hommes dans l'économie (Le Seuil, 2021).

== Recognition ==
Grosjean was named as a Fellow of the Academy of the Social Sciences in Australia in 2020, and a Fellow of the Econometric Society in 2022.
