= Arthur J. Robson =

New Zealand economist

- Citizenship: Canadian

Academic background
- Education: Victoria University of Wellington (B.Sc.); Massachusetts Institute of Technology (Ph.D.)
- Doctoral advisor: Robert M. Solow

Academic work
- Discipline: Game theory, Microeconomics, Biology and Economics
- Institutions: Simon Fraser University
- Website: Information at IDEAS / RePEc

Arthur J. Robson is a New Zealand economist whose research interests include game theory and the biological evolution of economic behaviour. In the period between 2003 and 2017, Robson held a Canada Research Chair in Economic Theory and Evolution at Simon Fraser University, where he has been a University Professor since 2017.

== Education ==
Robson graduated with a Bachelor of Science (honors) in pure and applied mathematics from the Victoria University of Wellington in 1968. Subsequently, he obtained a Ph.D. degree in economics from the Massachusetts Institute of Technology in 1974, where he also took courses in pure mathematics. His doctoral thesis’ title was “Congestion, Pollution and Urban Structure” and his supervisor was Robert M. Solow.

== Research ==
Robson's recent research has focused on the biological basis of economics and neuroeconomics. In particular, Robson has worked extensively on the study of the evolution of preferences. As a result of his work, Robson is ranked third by contributions on the field of evolutionary economics according to a RePEc ranking. Furthermore, among economic researchers in general, he is ranked fifth in Canada and 270th in the world according to another RePEc ranking. As of August 2020, Robson had published 72 papers altogether, with 14 of those in top economic journals such as the American Economic Review, Econometrica, the Journal of Political Economy and the Journal of Economic Literature.

== Academic positions ==
Robson held a long-term position at the University of Western Ontario from 1975 to 2005. During this period he also held visiting appointments at several universities including the University of Mannheim from 1985 to 1986 and the University of Michigan in 1989. Later, in 2003, Robson started his current tenure as professor at Simon Fraser University. Since then, Robson also held other visiting appointments in universities such as Johns Hopkins University in 2006.

== Awards and honors ==
Robson is a distinguished fellow of the New Zealand Association of Economists as well as a fellow of the Canadian Economics Association, the Game Theory Society, the Society for the Advancement of Economic Theory, the Royal Society of Canada and the Econometric Society. Furthermore, Robson was a recipient of multiple awards such as the John Rae Prize, a John Simon Guggenheim Memorial Foundation Fellowship and a Canada Council for the Arts Killam Research Fellowship.
