= Rim Lahmandi-Ayed =

Tunisian economist

Rim Lahmandi-Ayed (born 1969) is a Tunisian economist, and a professor of economics at Carthage University in Tunisia, where she heads the research group on economic and statistic modeling and analysis. Topics in her research have included product differentiation and targeted advertising.

== Education and career ==
Lahmandi-Ayed was born in 1969 in Nabeul. She earned an engineering degree from the École polytechnique in France in 1991, and a master's degree in economic modeling in 1992, with additional study at Paris 1 Panthéon-Sorbonne University. She completed a Ph.D. through the École polytechnique in 1995.

Returning to Tunisia, she became an assistant professor in the Faculty of Economic Sciences and Management in Tunis El Manar University from 1996 to 1999. She received a habilitation in 2000. She has been affiliated with the Tunisia Polytechnic School from 2000 to 2013 as a researcher, and she headed a master's program in economic modeling there from 2004 to 2013. Meanwhile, she became an associate professor in the Higher Institute of Management of Tunis University from 2002 to 2004. In 2005 she was named as a full professor in the Higher School of Statistics and Information Analysis (ESSAI) of Carthage University. She directed ESSAI from 2011 to 2017. In 2014, she became the founding director of the research group on economic and statistic modeling and analysis in ESSAI. Since 2022 she has also been a senior research fellow at the ESC Rennes School of Business in France.

== Recognition ==
Lahmandi-Ayed was named as a Fellow of the Econometric Society in 2021. She is also a Fellow of the Pan-African Scientific Research Council.
