= Helmut Bester =

German economist

Helmut Bester is a German economist who was a professor of economics at the Free University of Berlin until 2020. His research focuses on microeconomic theory, contract theory and industrial organisation.

== Education ==
Bester received his diploma in economics from the University of Bonn in 1979. He went on to further study at the London School of Economics and graduated with an M.Sc. in econometrics and mathematical economics in 1981. He received his Ph.D. in economics from the University of Bonn in 1984 and his habilitation in 1987.

== Career ==
Bester worked as a research assistant in economics at the University of Bonn from 1979 to 1988. The German Research Foundation then awarded him a Heisenberg fellowship, which he held until 1990, when Tilburg University appointed him to a professorship in economics. He left Tilburg for the Free University of Berlin in 1995.

He worked as an associate editor for a range of academic journals, such as Econometrica, the European Economic Review and the Journal of the European Economic Association.

The European Economic Association and the Econometric Society elected him fellow in 2004 and 2009, respectively.
