= Massimo Marinacci =

Israeli economist

- Citizenship: Italy

Academic background
- Education: Northwestern University
- Doctoral advisor: Itzhak Gilboa

Academic work
- Discipline: Economics decision theory game theory applied mathematics
- Institutions: Bocconi University; University of Turin; University of Bologna; University of Toronto
- Website: Information at IDEAS / RePEc

Massimo Marinacci is an Italian economist with contributions in decision theory. After obtaining his BA in Political Economy from Bocconi University, he earned his PhD in economics in 1996 under the supervision of Itzhak Gilboa. He currently holds the AXA-Bocconi Chair in Risk at the Department of Decision Sciences at Bocconi University.

His most influential work is on ambiguity aversion, an area in which he has published multiple papers with over 1000 citations.

Marinacci has contributed to the public discussion on how uncertainty should be incorporated in decision making. For example, together with Loïc Berger, he wrote a piece in The Conversation about how decision theory could be helpful for deciding whether to implement school closures during the COVID-19 pandemic.

Marinacci received the Polanyi Prize in 1998 for his contributions to economic science. He is also a Fellow of the Econometric Society and the European Economic Association.
