= Tao Zha =

Economist specializing in macroeconomics and econometrics

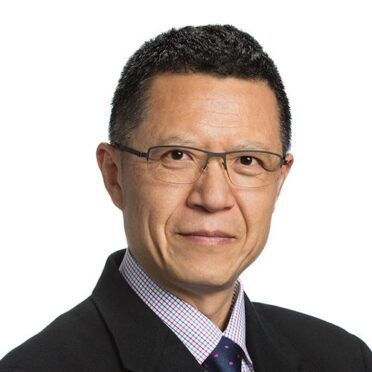
- Tao Zha

Academic background
- Education: Chengdu University of Technology (BS); Southwestern University of Finance and Economics (MA); Washington State University (MA); University of Minnesota (PhD)

Academic work
- Discipline: Economics
- Sub-discipline: Macroeconomics; Econometrics; Financial economics
- Institutions: Emory University; Federal Reserve Bank of Atlanta

Tao Zha is an economist whose research focuses on macroeconomics, econometrics, financial economics, and the Chinese economy. He is the Josh Resnick Distinguished Professor of Economics at Emory University and executive director of the Center for Quantitative Economic Research at the Federal Reserve Bank of Atlanta. He is also a research associate at the National Bureau of Economic Research (NBER).

Zha was a Wim Duisenberg Research Fellow at the European Central Bank in 2012. He was elected a Fellow of the Econometric Society in 2017, a Fellow of the International Association for Applied Econometrics in 2019, and a Fellow of the Royal Economic Society in 2025.

== Education ==
Zha received a BS in mathematics from Chengdu University of Technology in 1982 and an MA in statistics from Southwestern University of Finance and Economics in 1985. He received an MA in economics from Washington State University in 1988 and a PhD in economics from the University of Minnesota in 1992.

== Career ==
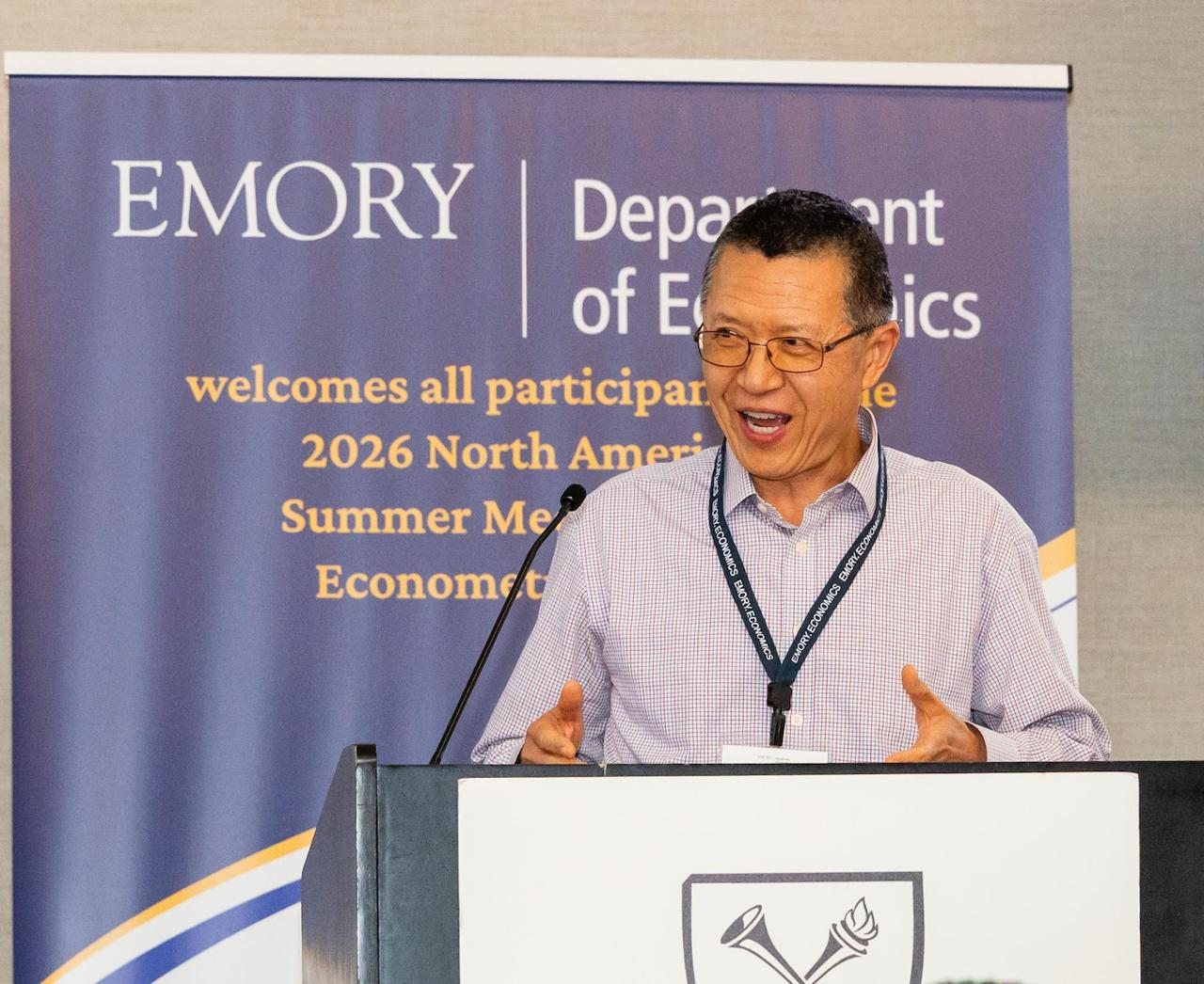
Tao Zha as Chair of the Scientific Program Committee for the 2026 North American Summer Meeting of the Econometric Society (NASMES)

Zha is the Josh Resnick Distinguished Professor of Economics at Emory University and is jointly affiliated with the Federal Reserve Bank of Atlanta. At the Atlanta Fed, he serves as executive director of the Center for Quantitative Economic Research. He is also a research associate at the National Bureau of Economic Research.

Zha has held a number of editorial positions in economics journals. He served as an associate editor of Econometrica from 2012 to 2015 and as coeditor of Quantitative Economics from 2018 to 2022. He also served on the Board of Editors of the American Economic Journal: Macroeconomics from 2014 to 2023 and the Journal of Economic Literature from 2020 to 2025.

In 2014, Zha was a visiting scholar at the Becker Friedman Institute for Economics at the University of Chicago. He is also an advisor to the Stone Center for Research on Wealth Inequality and Mobility at the University of Chicago.

Zha chaired the Scientific Program Committee for the 2026 North American Summer Meeting of the Econometric Society (NASMES), held at Emory University in Atlanta. In April 2026, he was a distinguished speaker on the Panel on the Global Economy at the 29th Harvard College China Forum at Harvard University.

== Research ==
Zha's research covers macroeconomics, financial economics, the Chinese economy, and econometrics.

=== Macroeconomics and monetary policy ===
With Eric M. Leeper, Zha developed a framework for analyzing hypothetical monetary-policy interventions. They described a "modest policy intervention" as a change in policy that does not significantly alter agents' beliefs about the policy regime, allowing the effects of such interventions to be analyzed using an identified linear model.

With Christopher A. Sims, Zha studied changes in United States monetary policy using a multivariate regime-switching model. Their article "Were There Regime Switches in U.S. Monetary Policy?" was published in the American Economic Review in 2006.

The study found evidence of changes in the U.S. monetary-policy rule but concluded that differences among the estimated regimes were not large enough to account for the rise and subsequent decline of inflation during the 1970s and 1980s.

Zha also collaborated with Thomas J. Sargent and Noah Williams on research concerning economic shocks, policymakers' beliefs, and postwar American inflation. Their article "Shocks and Government Beliefs: The Rise and Fall of American Inflation" was published in the American Economic Review in 2006.

Zha's 2008 article "Vector autoregressions", published in The New Palgrave Dictionary of Economics, was included among the review articles in NobelPrize.org's further-reading material for the 2011 Nobel Memorial Prize in Economic Sciences, which was awarded to Sargent and Sims for their empirical research on cause and effect in the macroeconomy.

=== Chinese economy ===
Zha has also studied monetary policy and the financial system in China. With Chen and Ren, he examined the relationship between monetary policy and shadow banking. Their article "The Nexus of Monetary Policy and Shadow Banking in China" was published in the American Economic Review in 2018.

The study found that contractionary monetary policy during 2009–2015 increased shadow-banking lending, offsetting part of the expected decline in traditional bank lending.

With Chen, Zha has also studied China's macroeconomic development since the beginning of the country's economic reforms in 1978. Their research examines the roles of gradualist reforms, labor reallocation, and capital deepening in China's economic growth.

Zha also discussed structural changes in China's economy and the challenges of transitioning from investment-led to consumption-led growth in a 2024 NBER Reporter article.

== Honors and recognition ==
In 2012, Zha was a Wim Duisenberg Research Fellow at the European Central Bank. The ECB describes the fellowship program as being aimed at senior professionals from academia, central banks, and research institutions who are internationally recognized experts in their fields.

Zha was elected a Fellow of the Econometric Society in 2017.

He was elected a Fellow of the International Association for Applied Econometrics in 2019.

In 2025, he was appointed a Fellow of the Royal Economic Society.

== Selected works ==
- Leeper, Eric M.; Zha, Tao (2003). "Modest Policy Interventions". Journal of Monetary Economics. 50 (8): 1673–1700.
- Sims, Christopher A.; Zha, Tao (2006). "Were There Regime Switches in U.S. Monetary Policy?". American Economic Review. 96 (1): 54–81. doi:10.1257/000282806776157678.
- Sargent, Thomas J.; Williams, Noah; Zha, Tao (2006). "Shocks and Government Beliefs: The Rise and Fall of American Inflation". American Economic Review. 96 (4): 1193–1224. doi:10.1257/aer.96.4.1193.
- Chen, Kaiji; Ren, Jue; Zha, Tao (2018). "The Nexus of Monetary Policy and Shadow Banking in China". American Economic Review. 108 (12): 3891–3936. doi:10.1257/aer.20170133.
