= Matthew Shum =

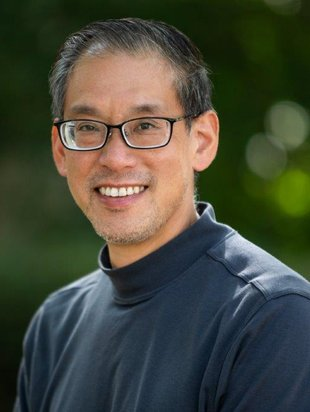
- Matthew Shum
- Born: February 21, 1970 (age 56); Houston, Texas, U.S.

Academic background
- Education: Columbia University (B.A.); Stanford University (Ph.D.)

Academic work
- Discipline: Econometrics; Industrial organization Behavioral economics
- Institutions: California Institute of Technology
- Website: Information at IDEAS / RePEc

Matthew Shou-Chung Shum is an American economist. He is the William D. Hacker Professor of Economics at the California Institute of Technology since 2023. He is married and has four children.

== Early life ==
Shum was born on February 21, 1970, in Houston, Texas.

== Biography ==
Shum received his B.A. from Columbia University in 1992. He received his Ph.D. in economics from Stanford University in 1998, working on his thesis under the supervision of Frank A. Wolak. He worked at the Union Bank of Switzerland as an analyst from 1992 to 1993. Shum became an assistant professor at the University of Toronto from 1998 to 2000 before moving to the faculty of Johns Hopkins University, where he taught until 2008. He became a professor at Caltech in 2008 and served as the J. Stanley Johnson Professor of Economics from 2016 to 2022. Since 2021, Shum has also been a member of the economics team on the Amazon Scholars program.

Shum's research lies at the intersection between econometrics and the study of industrial organizations that involves applying statistical modeling to consumer and firm-level datasets, studying equilibrium models of rational decision making. Aside from his work conducting research in the field of economics, Shum also has a history of performing editorial duties. He worked as an associate editor for the International Economic Review from 2010 to 2020 and a department editor for Management Science from 2014 to 2021.

== Awards and recognition ==
Shum was elected a fellow of the International Association of Applied Econometrics in 2020 and a fellow of the Econometric Society in 2021. He has delivered talks at events such as the 2021 Paris Conference on Digital Economics and the annual NBER Summer Institute, as well as virtual seminars at Texas A&M University, Princeton University, and the University of California, Los Angeles.

== Selected publications ==
- Econometric Models for Industrial Organization (World Science Lecture Notes in Economics). World Scientific, 2016.
- Advances in Econometrics (Vol. 31): Structural Econometric Models. Edited by Eugene Choo and Matthew Shum. Emerald Publishing, 2013.
