= Jennifer F. Reinganum =

American economist

- Born: United States

Academic background
- Education: Northwestern University (PhD); Northwestern University (MS); Oberlin College (BA)

Academic work
- Discipline: Economics
- Institutions: Vanderbilt University

Jennifer F. Reinganum is an American economist. She lives in Nashville, Tennessee where she is the E. Bronson Ingram Professor of Economics at Vanderbilt University. She has been a professor of economics since 1995. Reinganum was the president of the American Law and Economics Association for 2012 and has received multiple grant awards from the National Science Foundation.

== Education ==
Jennifer F. Reinganum received two bachelor's degrees, one in Mathematics and one in Economics, from Oberlin College in 1976. She continued her education at Northwestern University where she received her master's degree in Quantitative Methods in 1978. Reinganum stayed at Northwestern and received her Ph.D. in Managerial Economics and Decision Sciences in 1979.
