= Martin Schneider (economist) =

German economist

Martin Schneider is a German economist who is currently professor of economics at Stanford University. His research focuses on macroeconomics and financial economics.

== Education ==
Schneider received his Diplom in economics from the University of Bonn in 1993. He went on to further study with at Stanford University and graduated with a Ph.D. in economics in 1999. He was awarded a Stanford University and Bradley Foundation Fellowship during his time at Stanford.

== Career ==
The University of Rochester hired him as an assistant professor upon graduation in 1999. He left for an assistant professorship at UCLA after one year at Rochester. New York University appointed him as an assistant professor in 2003 and promoted him to associate professor in 2007. He worked as a senior economist at the Federal Reserve Bank of Minneapolis from 2005 to 2008. Stanford University hired him as a full professor in 2008. He was appointed research associate at the National Bureau of Economic Research the same year.

Schneider has worked in an editorial capacity for a range of academic journals, such as Economic Theory, the Review of Economic Dynamics, the Journal of Mathematical Economics and Macroeconomic Dynamics.

The Econometric Society elected him fellow in 2020.
