= Johannes Hörner =

French-German economist

Johannes Hörner (born 10 August 1972) is a French-German economist and currently member of the French National Centre for Scientific Research (CNRS). His research focuses on microeconomics and game theory.

== Education ==
Hörner graduated from the HEC Paris with an M.Sc. in management in 1994. He went on to study at DELTA, a predecessor of the Paris School of Economics, and received an M.A. in economics in 1994. He then studied for a Ph.D. in economics at the University of Pennsylvania and graduated in 2000.

== Career ==
The Kellogg School of Management at Northwestern University appointed Hörner assistant professor of managerial economics upon graduation. In 2005, he was promoted to associate professor before leaving for a professorship at Yale University in 2008. From 2014 to 2023, he was Alfred Cowles Professor.. He is currently working at the Toulouse School of Economics.

He was an associate editor of Econometrica and the Journal of Economic Theory. He serves as co-editor of Economic Theory and was co-editor of Theoretical Economics from 2010 to 2016.

In 2011, the Econometric Society elected him fellow.
