= Andy Harvey =

American baseball player

- Shortstop
- Threw: Right

Negro league baseball debut
- 1937, for the Philadelphia Stars

Last appearance
- 1938, for the Philadelphia Stars
- Stats at Baseball Reference

Teams
- Philadelphia Stars (1937–1938)

Andrew Harvey is an American former Negro league shortstop who played in the 1930s.

Harvey made his Negro leagues debut in 1937 with the Philadelphia Stars, and briefly played with the club again the following season. In 29 recorded career games, he posted 26 hits and 13 RBI in 102 plate appearances.
