= Kyle Bagwell =

American economics professor

- Born: February 15, 1961 (age 65)

Academic background
- Education: Stanford University; Southern Methodist University
- Doctoral advisor: Michael H. Riordan

Academic work
- Discipline: Industrial Organization; International Trade
- Institutions: Stanford University

Kyle Bagwell (born February 15, 1961) is an American economics professor. He is known for contributions to industrial organization and international trade.

== Education ==
Bagwell received a B.S. in economics and a B.A. in mathematics, both from Southern Methodist University, in 1983; and a Ph.D. in economics from Stanford University, in 1986, working under the supervision of Michael H. Riordan.

== Academic career ==
Bagwell is the Donald L. Lucas Endowed Professor in Economics at Stanford University. He held previous academic appointments at Columbia University and Northwestern University.

== Honors ==
Bagwell was elected Fellow for the Econometric Society in 2005.

== Research contributions and publications ==
Bagwell has published over 50 papers in specialized economics journals, on topics including trade agreements; competition and cooperation under private information; collusion; advertising and pricing with asymmetric information. Several of these have been widely cited and reprinted in various scholarly collections. Together with Robert Staiger, he is also the author of The Economics of the World Trading System (MIT Press, 2002).

== Professional and public service ==
Bagwell served as Editor of the RAND Journal of Economics from 1996 to 2002.
