= Yves Zenou =

French-Swedish economist

- Born: Rabat, Morocco
- Occupations: Researcher, network economist and professor
- Title: Richard Snape Chair in Business and Economics
- Awards: Fellow of the Econometric Society; Foreign Member of the Royal Swedish Academy of Sciences; SAET Economic Theory Fellow; Fellow of the Academy of the Social Sciences in Australia; Fellow of the Regional Science Association International

Academic background
- Education: Masters in Economics and Econometrics; PhD in Economics
- Alma mater: Paris Nanterre University; University of Paris II Panthéon-Assas

Academic work
- Institutions: Monash University

Yves Zenou is a French-Swedish-Australian economist. He is a professor at Monash University, a Vice-Chancellor’s Distinguished Professor, and holds the Richard Snape Chair in Business and Economics.

Zenou's main research focus is in the field of network economics. He has applied his research to crime, labor, development and other issues in economics. He is the author of ‘Urban Labor Economics’ and ‘Economic Analyses of Social Networks’ and has published various research articles.

Since July 2026, he is a co-editor of the Journal of Economic Theory. He was a co-editor of Regional Science and Urban Economics for ten years, between 2007 and 2017. He has been an Associate editor of many journals such as Economic Journal, Games and Economic Behavior, the Journal of the European Economic Association, Journal of Urban Economics, Scandinavian Journal of Economics and Journal of Public Economic Theory. He has also obtained many research grants from the Australian Research Council, the Jan Wallanders och Tom Hedelius Stiftelse, the Riksbankens Jubileumsfond, the Vetenskapsrådet, the Norface Research Program, and the Lincoln Institute of Land Policy.

== Education ==
Zenou completed his master's degree in economics and econometrics in 1987 from the Paris Nanterre University. In 1991, he earned his PhD in economics from Panthéon-Assas University. In 1998, he completed the "Agrégation des Facultés de Droit et de Sciences Economiques", the exam for becoming a professor in France.

== Career ==
Zenou started his career as an assistant professor at Panthéon-Assas University in 1992. Then, he became a research fellow at the Center for Operations Research and Econometrics (CORE), Louvain-La-Neuve, Belgium, from 1994 to 1996. He became an associate professor from 1996 till 1998 at Pantheon-Assas University. Then, he became a professor of economics at the Université du Maine, Le Mans, France in 1998 until 2000. He was a professor of economics at the University of Southampton in the UK from 2000 till 2003, a senior research fellow at Research Institute of Industrial Economics (IFN) from 2003 till 2007, and a professor of economics at Stockholm University from 2007 until 2016.

In 2016, Zenou joined Monash University as a professor and was appointed the Richard Snape Chair in Business and Economics. Zenou has research associations with the Research Institute of Industrial Economics (IFN), the Centre for Economic Policy Research (CEPR), the Institute for the Study of Labor (IZA), and the Centre for Research and Analysis of Migration (CReAM).

== Research ==
Zenou has been working in different areas in economics such as urban economics, labor economics, development economics, game theory, network economics, crime, segregation, discrimination, etc. both from a theoretical and empirical perspective. He developed the concept of ‘key player’ in network economics to help determine the individuals/agents that are the key actors in an economy. In crime, key players are the criminals who, once removed, lead to the highest reduction in total criminal activity. Originally developed for analyzing criminal activity, the key player theory is proving useful across multiple settings, such that of banking, crime, financial markets, macroeconomics, developing economies, and R&D issues. By identifying these key players, the outcomes were found to be more efficient than when targeting other agents such as the most active ones.

Zenou researched in 1999 about the reasons why rich families tend to live in the center of European cities such as Paris and why poor families tend to reside in the center of American cities such as downtown Detroit. Using an amenity-based theory, Zenou and his co-authors showed that the location of different income groups is related to the spatial pattern of amenities (such as restaurants, theatres, parks, etc.) in a city. Zenou takes the example of Paris (where there is a higher average income in the center) and compares with Detroit (where there is a lower average area income in the central area). The main result is to show that the rich in European cities are sensitive to the amenities provided by the center of the cities and are, therefore, more inclined to live in a city's central area if it has a greater amenity advantage over the suburbs. The opposite is true is American cities.

In 2009, he wrote a book entitled Urban Land Economics. This book proposes a theoretical overview of the links between urban and labor economics. Zenou discusses various models of urban labor theory of economics and then sheds light to the practical applications of this theory while analyzing the urban ghettos and the ethnic minorities residing there. Search-matching models, efficiency-wage models, urban ghettos and labor markets are discussed in detail. Yasuhiro Sato while reviewing the book wrote that "This informative book sets the stage for further theoretical and empirical work on urban labor markets." Sato also states that "the book provides a framework for further empirical tests of hypotheses concerning the urban labor market. It would be safe to say that Urban Labor Economics has opened a door to new and interesting work, both theoretical and empirical." Rouwendal and Ommeren called the book "competently written" and "compulsory reading for anyone in Urban Land Economics". According to them "Zenou presents each model masterfully, confirming his reputation as a skillful model builder. The variety of approaches serves to analyze a problem from various points of view." While reviewing the book in the Journal of Economic Geography, Duranton calls it "a lone star in the literature" and "a demanding read". About the content written in the book, Duranton states that "The first two appendices about the monocentric model and dynamic optimization are remarkable. I am actually using them in my own teaching" and writes that "Yves Zenou’s book is a worthy heir" to a book written by Masa Fujita about the monocentric model.

His most cited paper, "Who's Who in Networks: Wanted: The Key Player" (written with Ballester and Calvo-Armengol), published in Econometrica, has had a profound impact on the field of network economics. In this paper, Zenou and his co-authors demonstrate that, for a class of linear-quadratic utility functions, at any Nash equilibrium, the action of each agent corresponds to their Katz-Bonacich centrality—a pivotal sociological measure of network influence. By bridging game theory and network analysis, Zenou not only advanced economic modeling but also introduced the concept of targeting in strategic settings, revolutionizing how policymakers and economists approach networked interactions. One of his most influential contributions is the key player theory, which identifies the agents whose removal or intervention would most significantly alter a network’s outcomes. This seminal paper is the first to introduce the concepts of network centrality (Katz-Bonacich) and targeting (key players) in economics. Furthermore, it paved the way for the development of network games, now a dominant field within network economics.

In two important papers, Zenou and his co-authors have demonstrated that network games can be used to empirically test peer and network effects. In 2009, Zenou, along with Calvo-Armengol and Patacchini, published an article titled "Peer Effects and Social Networks in Education." This pioneering study investigated how a student's position within a network affects their educational outcomes. It revealed that being more central in a network positively impacts students' grades due to the complementarity of study efforts among peers in the same classroom. In 2024, Zenou, in collaboration with Boucher, Rendall, and Ushchev, provided a microfoundation for the linear-in-means (LIM) model based on network games and proposed a generalization of the LIM model. They found that, contrary to the predictions of the LIM model, agents in most activities do not focus solely on the average behavior of their peers. Instead, they sometimes care more about the behaviors of the most or least active agents in their network. More broadly, providing a microfoundation for empirical peer effect models based on network games aids in designing effective policies to combat crime and enhance education.

== Awards and honors ==
- 2012 - Elected Fellow of the Academy of Europe
- 2012 – Elected Fellow of the Regional Science Association International
- 2016 – Elected Fellow of the Econometric Society
- 2018 – Dean's Award for Excellence in Research, Monash University
- 2019 – Elected Fellow of the Academy of the Social Sciences in Australia
- 2019 – Appointed member of Executive Board, Asian and Australasian Society of Labour Economics (AASLE) and member of the Australasian Standing Committee of the Econometric Society.
- 2023 – Elected (foreign) member of the Royal Swedish Academy of Sciences.
- 2024 – Elected SAET Economic Theory Fellow.

== Bibliography ==
=== Books ===
- Urban Labor Economics (2009)
- Economic Analyses of Social Networks (2013)

=== Articles (selected) ===
- Ballester, C., Calvó-Armengol, A. and Y. Zenou (2006), "Who's who in networks. Wanted: the key player,” Econometrica 74(5), 1403–1417.
- Boucher, V., Rendall, M., Ushchev, P. and Y. Zenou (2024), “Toward a general theory of peer effects.” Econometrica 92(2), 543–565.
- Zenou, Y. and J. Zhou (2026). "Games on multiplex networks." American Economic Review 116(4), 1415-1458.
- Campbell, A., Ushchev, P. and Y. Zenou (2024), “The network origins of entry.” Journal of Political Economy, 132(11), 3867-3916.
- Della Lena, S., Merlino, L.P. and Y. Zenou (2026). "Affective polarization, media outlets, and opinion dynamics." Review of Economic Studies.
- Leister, M., Zenou, Y. and J. Zhou (2022), “Social connectedness and local contagion,” Review of Economic Studies 89(1), 372–410.
- Calvó-Armengol, A., Patacchini, E. and Y. Zenou (2009), “Peer effects and social networks in education,” Review of Economic Studies 76, 1239–1267.
- Gobillon, L., Selod, H. and Y. Zenou (2007), “The mechanisms of spatial mismatch,” Urban Studies 44, 2401–2427.
- Bisin, A., Patacchini, E., Verdier, T. and Y. Zenou (2008), “Are Muslim immigrants different in terms of cultural integration?” Journal of the European Economic Association 6, 445–456
- Zenou, Y. (2013), “Spatial versus social mismatch,” Journal of Urban Economics 74, 113–132.
- König, M., Tessone, C. and Y. Zenou (2014), “Nestedness in networks: A theoretical model and some applications,” Theoretical Economics 9, 695–752.
- Zenou, Y. (2015), “A dynamic model of weak and strong ties in the labor market,” Journal of Labor Economics 33, 891–932.
- Jackson, M.O., Rogers, B. and Y. Zenou (2017), “The economic consequences of social network structure,” Journal of Economic Literature 55(1), 49–95.
- König, M., Liu, X. and Y. Zenou (2019), “R&D networks: Theory, empirics and policy implications,” Review of Economics and Statistics 101(3), 476–491.
- Ushchev, P. and Y. Zenou (2020), “Social norms in networks,” Journal of Economic Theory 185, 104969.
- Olivetti, C., Patacchini, E. and Y. Zenou (2020), “Mothers, friends and gender identity,” Journal of the European Economic Association 18(1), 266–301.
