= Matthias Doepke =

German economist

Matthias Doepke is a German economist, currently Professor of Economics at the London School of Economics and Political Science and Gerald F. and Marjorie G. Fitzgerald Professor of Economic History at Northwestern University. His research focuses on economic growth, development, political economy and monetary economics.

== Education ==
Doepke received his Vordiplom from the University of Hagen in 1993 and his Diplom at the Humboldt University of Berlin in 1995. He went on to further study at the University of Chicago and graduated with a Ph.D. in economics in 2000.

== Career ==
The University of California, Los Angeles appointed him as an assistant professor in economics upon graduating from Chicago. He was promoted to associate professor in 2006, but left for an associate professorship at Northwestern University in 2008. He was promoted to full professor in 2012. He moved to LSE in 2022. He also works as a research associate at the National Bureau of Economic Research and as a research fellow at the Center for Economic Policy Research and the IZA Institute of Labor Economics.

Doepke is an editor of the Review of Economic Dynamics and served as its editor-in-chief from 2013 to 2017. He also serves as an associate editor of the American Economic Review, the Journal of Economic Growth and the Journal of Demographic Economics.

The Econometric Society elected him fellow in 2020.

== Selected works ==
- de la Croix, David; Doepke, Matthias (2003). "Inequality and Growth: Why Differential Fertility Matters". American Economic Review. 93 (4): 1091–1113. doi:10.1257/000282803769206214.
- Doepke, Matthias (2004). "Accounting for Fertility Decline During the Transition to Growth". Journal of Economic Growth. 9 (3): 347–383. doi:10.1023/B:JOEG.0000038935.84627.e4. S2CID 15218969.
- Doepke, Matthias; Zilibotti, Fabrizio (2008). "Occupational Choice and the Spirit of Capitalism". Quarterly Journal of Economics. 123 (2): 747–793. doi:10.1162/qjec.2008.123.2.747. S2CID 2649231.
- Doepke, Matthias; Kindermann, Fabian (2019). "Bargaining over Babies: Theory, Evidence, and Policy Implications". American Economic Review. 109 (9): 3264–3306. doi:10.1257/aer.20160328. hdl:10419/141562. S2CID 203227825.
- Alon, Titan; Doepke, Matthias; Olmstead-Rumsey, Jane; Tertilt, Michèle (2020). The Impact of COVID-19 on Gender Equality (Report). NBER Working Papers. doi:10.3386/w26947. S2CID 216507119.
- Doepke, Matthias; Zilibotti, Fabrizio (2019). Love, Money, and Parenting: How Economics Explains the Way We Raise Our Kids. Princeton University Press. ISBN 978-0691171517.
