= Michael H. Riordan =

American economics professor (born 1951)

Academic background
- Education: University of California, Berkeley; Georgetown University
- Doctoral advisor: Richard J. Gilbert

Academic work
- Discipline: Microeconomics; Industrial Organization
- Institutions: Columbia University
- Doctoral students: Kyle Bagwell
- Website: Information at IDEAS / RePEc

Michael H. Riordan (born 1951) is an American economics professor. He is known for contributions to microeconomics and industrial organization.

== Education ==
Riordan received a B.S. in International Relations from Georgetown University in 1973, an M.A. in economics (with distinction) from the University of Essex in 1975, and a Ph.D. in economics from the University of California at Berkeley in 1981, working under the supervision of Richard J. Gilbert.

== Career ==
Riordan began his career as a research assistant at the Federal Reserve Bank of San Francisco in 1976. He later entered the academic field by teaching at several universities, including University of California, Berkeley, University of Pennsylvania, Stanford University, and Boston University throughout 1980 to 1999. During that time, he also worked for the Federal Trade Commission as well as the Federal Communications Commission for about a year each. At the start of 2000 and for nearly twenty years, he taught at Columbia University and was named the Laurans A. and Arlene Mendelson Emeritus Professor of Economics in 2008. Throughout his career in the academic field, he has published over 60 papers in specialized economics journals, several of which have been widely cited and reprinted in various scholarly collections.

Riordan served as co-editor of the RAND Journal of Economics, was a member of the editorial board of the American Economic Review, and associate editor of the Quarterly Journal of Economics. He served as Chief Economist of the Federal Communications Commission and as Economic Advisor at the Federal Trade Commission.

== Honors ==
Riordan was a National Fellow at Stanford University's Hoover Institution from 1986 to 1987. In 1994, he was elected Fellow of the Econometric Society.
