= Robert W. Staiger =

American economist, academic, and author

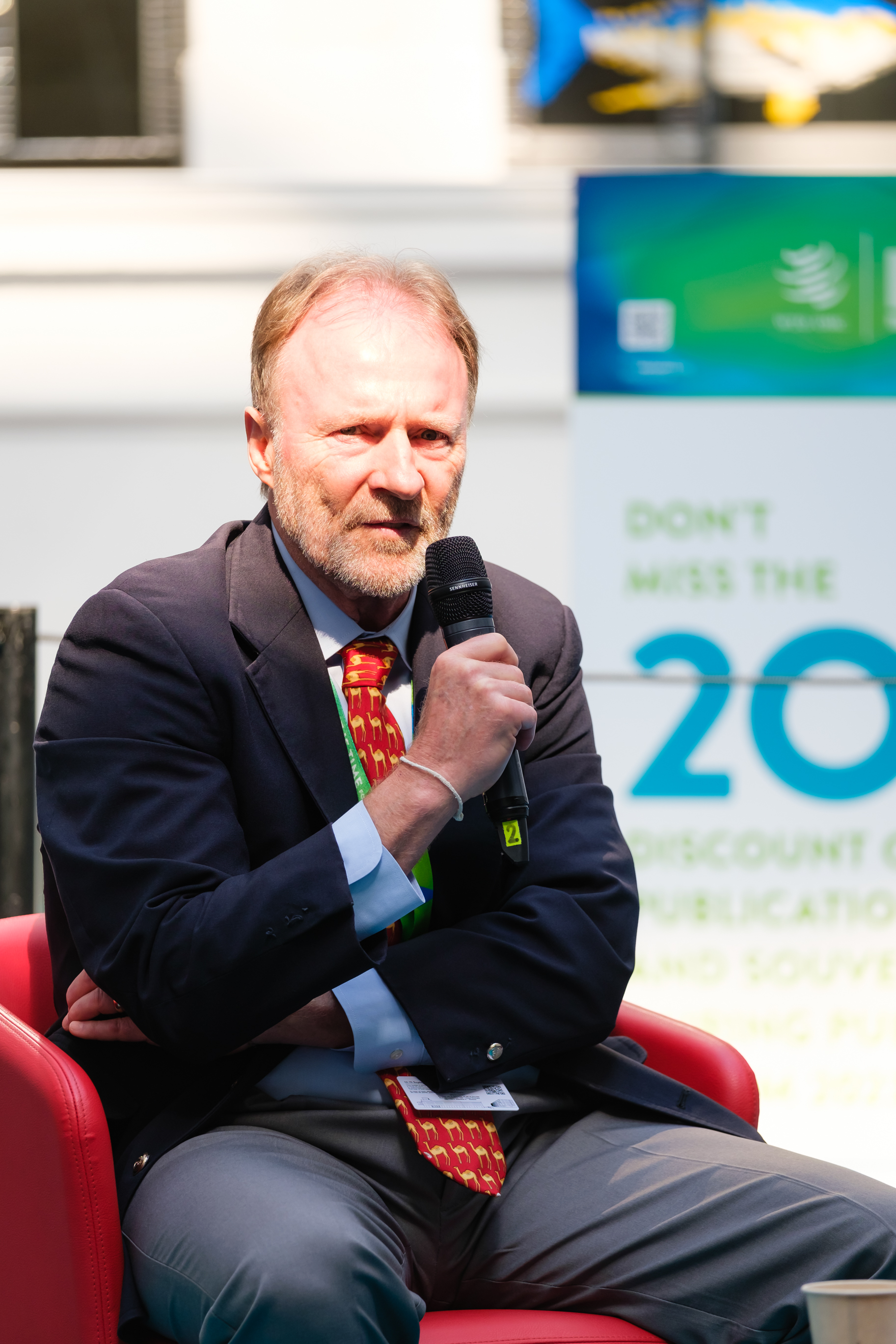
- Born: United States
- Occupation: Economist
- Known for: International trade research International Trade Policy

Academic background
- Education: Bachelor of Arts, Williams College; PhD Economics, University of Michigan
- Doctoral advisor: Alan Deardorff

Academic work
- Institutions: Professor of Economics, Dartmouth College

Robert W. Staiger is an American economist who is the Roth Family Distinguished Professor in the Arts and Sciences and Professor of Economics at Dartmouth College. He is known for his research on international trade policy, and in particular on the economics of the GATT/WTO.

Staiger's research has been published in a variety of academic journals, and in two books: The Economics of the World Trading System, co-authored with Kyle Bagwell and published by MIT Press (2002), and A World Trading System for the Twenty-First Century, published by MIT Press in 2022. He has also served as Editor, with Kyle Bagwell, of The Handbook of Commercial Policy, published by Elsevier in December 2016.

== Education and career ==
Staiger completed his Bachelor of Arts from Williams College in 1980 and his PhD in economics from the University of Michigan in 1985. After completing his PhD, Staiger joined Stanford University as an assistant professor of economics, a position he held until 1991, when he was promoted to associate professor of economics. He moved to the University of Wisconsin in 1993 and was promoted to full professor there in 1996. He returned to Stanford University in 2006 and was named Holbrook Working Professor in Commodity Price Studies in 2009. He returned to Wisconsin as the Stockwell Professor of Economics in 2012, serving until 2014. Since 2014, he has been the Roth Family Distinguished Professor in the Arts and Sciences and Professor of Economics at Dartmouth College.

Staiger also served as Senior Staff Economist at the Council of Economic Advisers from 1991 to 1992, He also served as Co-Editor of the Journal of International Economics from 1995 to 2010 and as Editor (with Charles Engel) from 2010 through 2017. He has been a Research Associate of the National Bureau of Economic Research since 1989.

In 2024, Staiger signed a faculty letter supporting Dartmouth College president Sian Beilock, who ordered the arrest of 90 students and faculty members protesting the Gaza war.

== Awards and honors ==
- 1988 – Dean's Award for Distinguished Teaching, Stanford University
- 1988–89 – National Fellow, The Hoover Institution
- 1990–92 – Alfred P Sloan Research Fellow
- 2008 to present – Fellow, Econometric Society
- 2016 – Ohlin Lecture at the Stockholm School of Economics
- 2018 – Dr. Frank Anton Distinguished Lecture at the University of Calgary
- 2018 – Frank D. Graham Memorial Lecture at Princeton University
- 2018 – Luca d’Agliano Lecture in Turin Italy
- 2018 – Jones Lecture at the University of Rochester.
