= Anat Admati =

Economist

Anat Ruth Admati
- ענת אדמתי
- Born: 1956 (age 69–70); Israel

Academic background
- Education: Hebrew University of Jerusalem; Yale University

Academic work
- Discipline: Financial economics
- Institutions: Stanford Graduate School of Business
- Awards: Fellow of the Econometric Society
- Website: admati.people.stanford.edu; Information at IDEAS / RePEc

Anat Ruth Admati (Hebrew: ענת אדמתי; born 1956) is an economist and currently the George G.C. Parker Professor of Finance and Economics at Stanford Graduate School of Business. In 2014, Time listed her as one of the 100 Most Influential People in the World.

== Career and education ==
Admati was born in Israel. She obtained her BSc from Hebrew University of Jerusalem and her PhD from Yale University in operations research and management science. After graduating with her PhD, she took a job as assistant professor at Stanford Graduate School of Business becoming full Professor in 1992. In 2015, she was a Henry Kaufmann Visiting professor of business at Stern School of Business. And in 2017–2018, she was a visiting scholar at the IMF. She is currently the Faculty director of the Corporations and Society Initiative at Stanford University.

== Research ==
Anat Admati interviewed on instability in the financial system and regulatory solutions, March 2017

Her research focuses on dissemination in financial markets, financial contracting, portfolio management, corporate governance and banking. Her paper "A Theory of Intraday Patterns: Volume and Price Variability", joint with Paul Pfleiderer, has been cited 4000 times according to IDEAS. The paper shows how liquidity traders and informed traders influence the price of assets. It helps explain the patterns of "volume and price variability in intraday transaction data".

Her research has been quoted in news media including Bloomberg, NPR, Forbes, The New York Times, The Financial Times, The Guardian, Time magazine, CNN, The Independent, CNBC, The Economist, The Wall Street Journal, and the Washington Post. A recent New York Times article about professor Admati was titled "When She Talks, Banks Shudder" and another article about her was titled "This Stanford Economist Has Obama's Attention — And It's Causing A Wall Street Freak-Out", following the publication of her book The Bankers' New Clothes. The book was nominated by the Financial Times in their Books of the year prize.

== Awards and recognition ==
She has won an Alfred A. Sloan Research Fellowship and she is a Fellow of the Econometric Society. According to IDEAS, she is the 63rd most influential woman economist and she is among the 1000 most cited economists. In 2014, she received an honorary doctorate from the University of Zurich. In 2015, she was named by Prospect on its list of 50 world thinkers. In 2021, Yale awarded her the Wilbur Cross Medal.

She was an advisor to the TV series Silicon Valley, and made a cameo appearance in its final episode.

== Selected bibliography ==
- Admati, Anat R. (2013) and Hellwig, Martin F. . The bankers' new clothes : what's wrong with banking and what to do about it. Hellwig, Martin F. Princeton: Princeton University Press.
- Admati, Anat R.; Pfleiderer, Paul (1988-01-01). "A Theory of Intraday Patterns: Volume and Price Variability". The Review of Financial Studies. 1 (1): 3–40.
- Admati, Anat R. (1991-10-01). "The informational role of prices: A review essay". Journal of Monetary Economics. 28 (2): 347–361.
- Admati, Anat R.; Pfleiderer, Paul (2000-07-01). "Forcing Firms to Talk: Financial Disclosure Regulation and Externalities". The Review of Financial Studies. 13 (3): 479–519.
- Admati, Anat R.; Pfleiderer, Paul; Zechner, Josef (1994-12-01). "Large Shareholder Activism, Risk Sharing, and Financial Market Equilibrium". Journal of Political Economy. 102 (6): 1097–1130.
