= Raquel Fernández =

Economist

Academic background
- Education: Princeton University; Columbia University

Academic work
- Discipline: International economics, Economics of education, Political economy
- Institutions: New York University
- Website: as.nyu.edu/faculty/raquel-fernandez.html; Information at IDEAS / RePEc

Raquel Fernández is an economist and currently the Julius Silver, Roslyn S. Silver and Enid Silver Winslow Professor of Economics at New York University. She is also a fellow of the Econometric Society.

== Career and education ==
Fernández obtained a B.A. in economics from Princeton University in 1981 and a Ph.D in from Columbia University in 1988. From 1987 to 1996, she was an assistant and then associate professor at Boston University. In 1996, she joined New York University as an associate professor. She is a research associate at the National Bureau of Economic Research, a fellow at the Centre for Economic Policy Research and a research fellow at the IZA Institute of Labor Economics.

She was on the editorial board of the Journal of Economic Literature.

== Research ==
Her research focuses on economic inequality, cultural economics, development economics, gender economics and sovereign debt. Her works have been cited over 12000 times and she has published papers in the Quarterly Journal of Economics, The American Economic Review and the Review of Economics Studies.

Her most cited paper, "Resistance to reform: Status quo bias in the presence of individual-specific uncertainty" with Dani Rodrik asks why politicians rarely adopt optimal policies as recommended by economists. The paper shows that policymakers have a bias for the status quo. The paper was later the object of a comment paper in 2003 by Antonio Ciccone.

Her research has been featured in various media outlets including The Los Angeles Times, The New York Post and The New York Times.

=== Selected works ===
- Fernandez, Raquel; Rodrik, Dani (1991). "Resistance to Reform: Status Quo Bias in the Presence of Individual- Specific Uncertainty". The American Economic Review. 81 (5): 1146–1155. ISSN 0002-8282
- Fernández, Raquel; Fogli, Alessandra; Olivetti, Claudia (2004-11-01). "Mothers and Sons: Preference Formation and Female Labor Force Dynamics". The Quarterly Journal of Economics. 119 (4): 1249–1299.
- Fernández, Raquel; Guner, Nezih; Knowles, John (2005-02-01). "Love and Money: A Theoretical and Empirical Analysis of Household Sorting and Inequality". The Quarterly Journal of Economics. 120 (1): 273–344.
- Fernández, Raquel; Rogerson, Richard (1998). "Public Education and Income Distribution: A Dynamic Quantitative Evaluation of Education-Finance Reform". The American Economic Review. 88 (4): 813–833. ISSN 0002-8282.
- Fernández, Raquel (2013). "Cultural Change as Learning: The Evolution of Female Labor Force Participation over a Century". American Economic Review. 103 (1): 472–500. doi:10.1257/aer.103.1.472. ISSN 0002-8282.
- Fernandez, Raquel; Rogerson, Richard (1995-04-01). "On the Political Economy of Education Subsidies". The Review of Economic Studies. 62 (2): 249–262. doi:10.2307/2297804. ISSN 0034-6527.
