= Andrea Weber =

Applied labor economist

Andrea Weber is an applied labor economist and currently a professor at the Central European University. She is a co-editor of the Journal of Public Economics.

She is a research fellow at the Institute of Labor Economics and a fellow at the CEPR.

== Career and education ==
She obtained her PhD from the Vienna University of Technology and an MA in Mathematics from the same university. Before joining the CEU, she was a professor at Vienna University of Economics and Business and the University of Mannheim and was a visiting assistant professor at University of California, Berkeley.

In 2016 she became a member of the German Academy of Sciences Leopoldina.

== Research ==
Weber's research mainly focuses on labor economics and applied econometrics. Her work has been cited 5880 times according to Google Scholar. She has published papers in The Quarterly Journal of Economics, Econometrica, the American Economic Review and the Economic Journal.

Her research has been featured in The Economist, Quartz, Vox, Bloomberg and Die Presse.

=== Selected bibliography ===
- Card, David; Kluve, Jochen; Weber, Andrea (2010). "Active Labour Market Policy Evaluations: A Meta-Analysis*". The Economic Journal. 120 (548): F452–F477.
- Chetty, Raj; Guren, Adam; Manoli, Day; Weber, Andrea (2011). "Are Micro and Macro Labor Supply Elasticities Consistent? A Review of Evidence on the Intensive and Extensive Margins". American Economic Review. 101 (3): 471–475.
- Card, David; Chetty, Raj; Weber, Andrea (2007-11-01). "Cash-on-Hand and Competing Models of Intertemporal Behavior: New Evidence from the Labor Market". The Quarterly Journal of Economics. 122 (4): 1511–1560.
- Card, David; Chetty, Raj; Weber, Andrea (2007). "The Spike at Benefit Exhaustion: Leaving the Unemployment System or Starting a New Job?". American Economic Review. 97 (2): 113–118.
- Card, David; Lee, David S.; Pei, Zhuan; Weber, Andrea (2015). "Inference on Causal Effects in a Generalized Regression Kink Design". Econometrica. 83 (6): 2453–2483.
