= Faruk Gül =

American economist

Academic background
- Education: Boğaziçi University (BS); Princeton University (PhD)
- Doctoral advisor: Hugo F. Sonnenschein
- Website: Information at IDEAS / RePEc

Faruk R. Gül is a Turkish American economist, a professor of economics at Princeton University, and a fellow of the Econometric Society.

== Biography ==
Gül did his undergraduate studies at Boğaziçi University, and received his Ph.D. from Princeton University in 1986, where he was a student of Hugo F. Sonnenschein. He has been on the Princeton faculty since 1995.

Recently, Gül has specialized in choice theory, working with Wolfgang Pesendorfer on the revealed preference theory of temptation and self control.

To date, Gül has 69 publications, his first publication being "Foundations of Dynamic Monopoly and Coase Conjecture," published 1986 in the Journal of economic Theory.

== Selected works ==
- Gül, Faruk; Pesendorfer, Wolfgang (2001). "Temptation and Self-Control". Econometrica. 69 (6): 1403–1435. doi:10.1111/1468-0262.00252.
- Gül, Faruk; Pesendorfer, Wolfgang (2004). "Self-Control and the Theory of Consumption". Econometrica. 72: 119–158. doi:10.1111/j.1468-0262.2004.00480.x.
- Gül, Faruk; Pesendorfer, Wolfgang (2006). "Random Expected Utility". Econometrica. 74: 121–146. doi:10.1111/j.1468-0262.2006.00651.x.
