= Review of Economic Dynamics =

- Discipline: Macroeconomics
- Language: English
- Edited by: Matthias Doepke

Publication details
- History: 1998–present
- Publisher: Elsevier
- Frequency: Quarterly
- Impact factor: 1.746 (2013)

Standard abbreviations
- ISO 4: Rev. Econ. Dyn.

Indexing
- ISSN: 1094-2025
- LCCN: 98641132
- OCLC no.: 37730900

Links
- Journal homepage; Online archive; Journal page at publisher's website; Online archive At Elsevier's website

The Review of Economic Dynamics is a quarterly peer-reviewed academic journal published by Elsevier on behalf of the Society for Economic Dynamics. It covers dynamic models from all areas of economics. The editor-in-chief is Matthias Doepke (Northwestern University).

== Abstracting and indexing ==
The journal is abstracted and indexed in RePEc, Scopus, Social Sciences Citation Index, and Current Contents/Social & Behavioral Sciences. According to the Journal Citation Reports, the journal has a 2013 impact factor of 1.746.

== See also ==
- List of economics journals
