= Nicola Persico =

Italian-American economist

Nicola Giuseppe Persico
- Born: 1967 (age 58–59); Palermo
- Education: Bocconi University, Northwestern University
- Awards: 2007 Carlo Alberto Medal, 2014 Reiter Prize from Kellogg
- Scientific career
- Fields: Economics
- Institutions: Kellogg School of Management at Northwestern University
- Thesis: Acquiring information: three essays on the economics of information (1996)
- Website: nicolapersico.com

Nicola Giuseppe Persico (born 1967) is an Italian-American economist. He is the John L. and Helen Kellogg Professor of Managerial Economics & Decision Sciences at the Kellogg School of Management at Northwestern University, where he directs the Center for Mathematical Studies in Economics & Management.

== Education and career ==
Persico received his laurea from Bocconi University in 1991 and his Ph.D. from Northwestern University in 1996, both in economics. He then served as an assistant professor at the University of California, Los Angeles for one year before leaving for the University of Pennsylvania. In 2006, he left his position as an associate professor of economics at the University of Pennsylvania to become a full professor of economics at New York University. In 2011, he joined the Kellogg School of Management, where he was named the John L. and Helen Kellogg Professor in 2014; he will retain this title until 2019.

== Research interests ==
Persico's research covers multiple disciplines within economics, including political economy and labor economics. This includes multiple studies he has co-authored which found a positive relationship between someone's height as a teenager and their income later in life. He and his colleagues have also shown that it is better to do one task at a time (sequentially) than to do multiple tasks simultaneously.
