= George Tauchen =

- Occupations: Economist, academic and researcher

Academic background
- Education: University of Wisconsin–Madison (BA); University of Minnesota (PHD)

Academic work
- Discipline: Economics
- Institutions: Duke University

George Tauchen is an American economist, academic and researcher specializing in econometrics, time series analysis, financial econometrics, and macroeconomics. He is Glasson Professor Emeritus of Economics and Finance, Duke University.

== Education and career ==
Tauchen received a B.A. from the University of Wisconsin–Madison in 1971. After earning his Ph.D. from the University of Minnesota, he joined the faculty at Duke University in 1977. He is recognized for his contributions to the development of computational and statistical methods in economics, particularly in the approximation of stochastic processes used in dynamic economic models. Tauchen has served as editor of the Journal of Business and Economic Statistics and as co-editor or associate editor of Econometrica, Econometric Theory and Journal of the American Statistical Association.

== Awards and honors ==
- 1993: Fellow, American Statistical Association
- 1994: Fellow, Econometric Society
- 2003: Scholar/Teacher of the Year, Duke University
- 2004: Fellow, Journal of Econometrics
- 2012: Fellow, Society for Financial Econometrics

== Selected publications ==
- Tauchen, George E.; Pitts, Mark (1983). "The Price Variability-Volume Relationship on Speculative Markets". Econometrica. 51 (2): 485–505. doi:10.2307/1912002. ISSN 0012-9682.
- Tauchen, George; Hussey, Robert (1991). "Quadrature-Based Methods for Obtaining Approximate Solutions to Nonlinear Asset Pricing Models". Econometrica. 59 (2): 371–396. doi:10.2307/2938261. ISSN 0012-9682.
- Tim, Bollerslev,; George, Tauchen,; Hao, Zhou, (2009). "Expected Stock Returns and Variance Risk Premia". The Review of Financial Studies. 22 (11). doi:10.1093/rfs/hhp008. ISSN 0893-9454.
- Tauchen, George (2011). "Stochastic Volatility in General Equilibrium". The Quarterly Journal of Finance. 01 (04): 707–731. doi:10.1142/S2010139211000237. ISSN 2010-1392.
- Todorov, Viktor; Tauchen, George (2014). "Limit theorems for the empirical distribution function of scaled increments of Itô semimartingales at high frequencies". The Annals of Applied Probability. 24 (5). doi:10.1214/13-AAP965. ISSN 1050-5164.
- Li, Jia; Todorov, Viktor; Tauchen, George (2013). "Volatility occupation times". The Annals of Statistics. 41 (4). doi:10.1214/13-AOS1135. ISSN 0090-5364.
- Li, Jia; Todorov, Viktor; Tauchen, George (2017). "Jump Regressions". Econometrica. 85 (1): 173–195. doi:10.3982/ECTA12962. ISSN 0012-9682.
- Li, Jia; Todorov, Viktor; Tauchen, George (2017). "Robust Jump Regressions". Journal of the American Statistical Association. 112 (517): 332–341. doi:10.1080/01621459.2016.1138866. ISSN 0162-1459.
