= Bryan S. Graham =

American economist

- Occupations: Economist, professor

Academic background
- Education: B.A. (1997), Tufts University; Fulbright Scholar (1997-1998) Australian National University; M.Phil. (2000), University of Oxford; M.A., Ph.D. (2005), Harvard University

Academic work
- Institutions: University of California, Berkeley; National Bureau of Economic Research

Bryan S. Graham is an economist and professor at the University of California, Berkeley. Graham is also a research associate in development economics and labor studies with NBER.

Graham is a co-editor at the Review of Economics and Statistics and a network member of the Human Capital and Economic Opportunity Global Working Group at the University of Chicago.

Graham's research has been funded by the National Science Foundation.

== Career ==
Graham joined the faculty at the University of California, Berkeley in 2005.

Graham was a member of the faculty at New York University from 2009 to 2011, while on leave from the University of California, Berkeley.

Graham returned as active faculty at the University of California, Berkeley in 2011.

== Research ==
Graham's research has been cited by the IMF's Finance & Development, the World Bank, the United Nations' Department of Economic and Social Affairs, and in RAND Corporation research.

Graham has been consulted as an expert on statistics in journalism from The New York Times.

Graham has worked on social mobility research with Patrick Sharkey for the Pew Charitable Trusts, as covered by the Brookings Institution.

== Awards ==
Graham was a Rhodes Scholar and a Fulbright Scholar.
