= Andrew C. Harvey =

Andrew C. Harvey is an Emeritus Professor of Econometrics at the University of Cambridge. He is most noted for his work on time-series econometrics. He is a fellow of both the Econometric Society and of the British Academy. Harvey completed his undergraduate studies in economics and statistics at the University of York and a took an MSc Statistics at London School of Economics(LSE) (1969) prior to his move to Cambridge in 1996 to be a professor of econometrics and a Fellow of Corpus Christi College (Cambridge) he worked at Kenya's Central Bureau of Statistics, the University of Kent at Canterbury, at the University of British Columbia and at LSE.

== Selected publications ==
- Harvey, A. C. (1993). Time series models. MIT press.
- Harvey, A. C. (1990). The econometric analysis of time series. MIT press.
- Harvey, A. C. (1990). Forecasting, structural time series models and the Kalman filter.Cambridge, UK: Cambridge University Press.
