= Sydney C. Ludvigson =

American economist

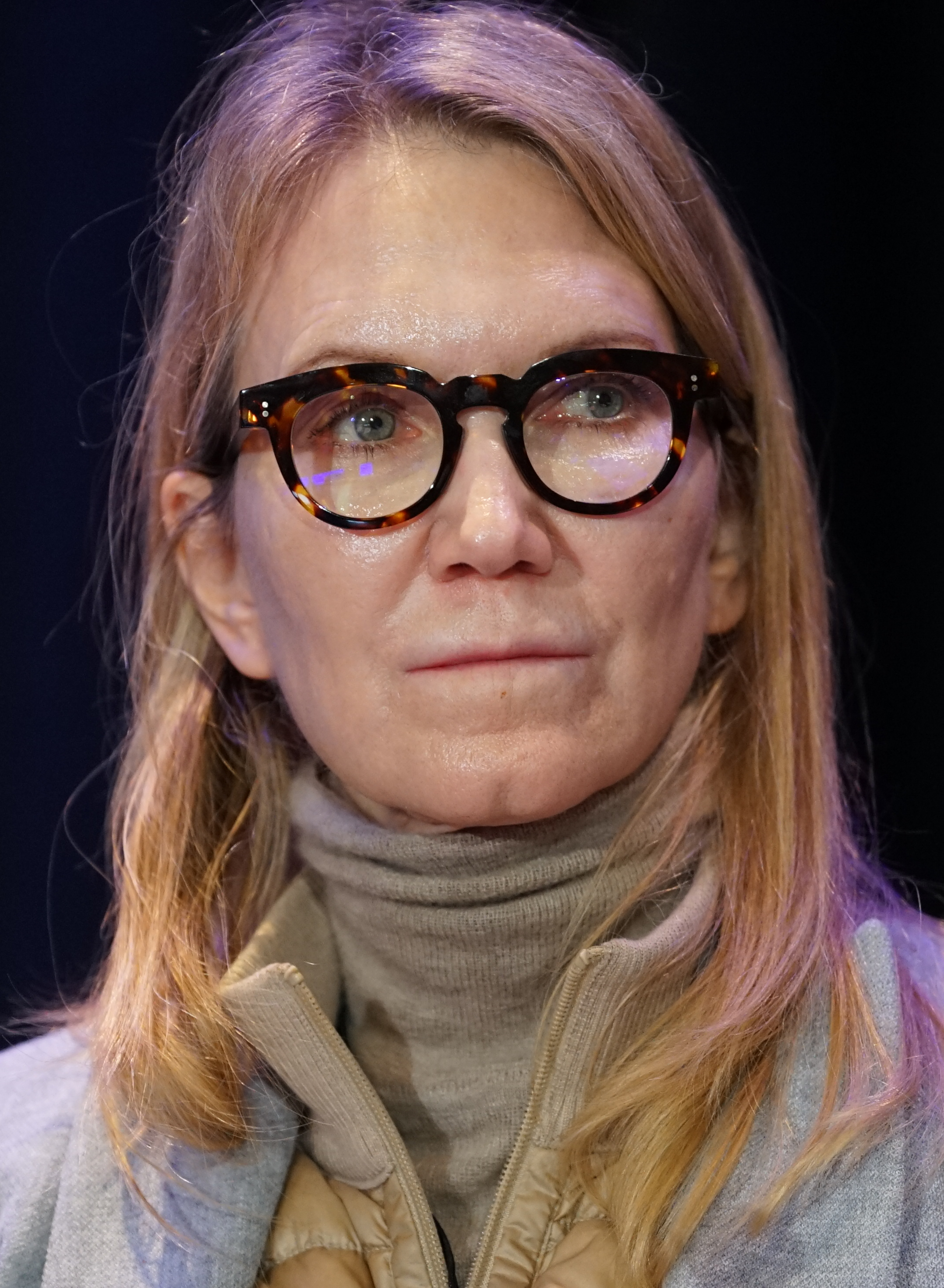
- Ludvigson at ASSA 2026

Academic background
- Education: University of California, Los Angeles (BA); Princeton University (MA, PhD)

Academic work
- Discipline: Asset pricing, Macroeconomics, Finance
- Institutions: New York University; National Bureau of Economic Research
- Notable ideas: Asset pricing models, CCAPM, Macro-finance, Measuring economic uncertainty
- Awards: President-Elect, American Finance Association (2026); Fellow of the Econometric Society (2021); Fellow of the Society for Financial Econometrics; Edward Mills Best Paper Award (2021)
- Website: www.sydneyludvigson.com

Sydney C. Ludvigson is an American economist and the Julius Silver, Roslyn S. Silver, and Enid Silver Winslow Professor of Economics at New York University. From 2017 to 2023, she served as chair of NYU's economics department. In 2026, Ludvigson began serving as the President-Elect of the American Finance Association.

She is a research associate at the National Bureau of Economic Research and a co-director of the Asset Pricing Program. From 2008 to 2011, she was an associate editor of the American Economic Review.

== Education and career ==
She obtained her M.A. and Ph.D. from Princeton University and a B.A. in economics from the University of California, Los Angeles. From 1996 to 2001, she was an economist at the Federal Reserve Bank of New York. In 2001, she joined New York University as an assistant professor. Since 2017, she is on the Economic Advisory Panel of the Federal Reserve Bank of New York.

In 2008, she was awarded the Richard Stone Prize in Applied Econometrics for the best paper in Journal of Applied Econometrics. In 2017, she was nominated a Fellow of the Society for Financial Econometrics. In 2021, she was elected Fellow of the Econometric Society.

== Research ==
Her research is at the crossing of finance and economics and she mainly focuses on asset pricing and macroeconomics. Her works have been cited over 19000 times and is the 526th most cited economist in the world according to IDEAS. She has written articles in the Journal of Finance, the Journal of Political Economy, the American Economic Review, The Review of Financial Studies and the Journal of Economic Perspectives.

Her research has been featured in The Wall Street Journal, Handelsblatt, Bloomberg, The Guardian and the Investors Chronicle.

== Selected bibliography ==
- Lettau, Martin; Ludvigson, Sydney (2001). "Consumption, Aggregate Wealth, and Expected Stock Returns". The Journal of Finance. 56 (3): 815–849.
- Lettau, Martin; Ludvigson, Sydney (2001-12-01). "Resurrecting the (C)CAPM: A Cross‐Sectional Test When Risk Premia Are Time‐Varying". Journal of Political Economy. 109 (6): 1238–1287.
- Jurado, Kyle; Ludvigson, Sydney C.; Ng, Serena (2015). "Measuring Uncertainty". American Economic Review. 105 (3): 1177–1216.
- Ludvigson, Sydney C.; Ng, Serena (2009). "Macro Factors in Bond Risk Premia". The Review of Financial Studies. 22 (12): 5027–5067.
- Lettau, Martin; Ludvigson, Sydney C. (2004). "Understanding Trend and Cycle in Asset Values: Reevaluating the Wealth Effect on Consumption". American Economic Review. 94 (1): 276–299.
- Ludvigson, Sydney C. (2004). "Consumer Confidence and Consumer Spending". Journal of Economic Perspectives. 18 (2): 29–50.
