= Biological economics =

Social science

Biological economics is an interdisciplinary field in which the interaction of human biology and economics is studied. The journal Economics and Human Biology covers the field and has an impact factor of 2.722.

== See also ==
- Ecological economics
- Sociobiology
