= Christopher Woodruff =

American economist

- Born: 1959
- Occupation(s): American economist and professor

Christopher Woodruff (born in 1959) is an American economist and Professor of Development Economics at Oxford University.

== Biography ==
Christopher Woodruff earned a B.A. in economics from the University of Chicago in 1980, followed by a M.A. in economics from the University of California at Los Angeles in 1984. In parallel, from 1981 to early 1987, Woodruff worked as economist and manager of financial planning of the Central Power and Light Company in Corpus Christi, Texas. In 1994, he earned a Ph.D. in economics from the University of Texas at Austin with a thesis on specific investments and industry location in Mexico under Dale O. Stahl, after which he took up a position as assistant professor at the Graduate School of International Relations and Pacific Studies of the University of California at San Diego, where he was promoted to associate professor and finally to full professor in 2002 and 2009, respectively. In 2009, Woodruff moved to the University of Warwick, before becoming a professor of developing economics at the University of Oxford in 2016. Moreover, Woodruff has been a co-director of the International Growth Centre's Programme on Firm Capabilities since 2009 and has acted as scientific coordinator of the DFID-CEPR Research Programme on Private Enterprise Development in Low-Income Countries. Additionally, Woodruff is affiliated with the NBER, Centre for Competitive Advantage and the Global Economy (CAGE), Bureau for Research and Economic Analysis of Development (BREAD), CEPR, and IZA. In terms of professional service, Woodruff has performed editorial duties for the Journal of Development Economics, World Bank Economic Review, Journal of African Economies, the B.E. Journal of Economic Analysis and Policy, and the Journal of Comparative Economics.

== Research ==
Christopher Woodruff's research interests focus on enterprises in developing countries, especially through the use of field experiments. In terms of research output, he ranks among the top 2% of economists registered on IDEAS/RePEc. In his research, Woodruff has been a frequent co-author of David McKenzie (World Bank) and Suresh de Mel (University of Peradeniya).

=== Research on economies of transition ===
An early area of Woodruff's research has been the role of institutions such as rule of law and property rights in transition countries. For instance, together with John McMillan, Woodruff finds that Vietnamese firms in the 1990s were more likely to give a customer credit the more limited the customer's access to alternative credit suppliers, the longer the duration of their trading relationship and the more information it had gathered about the customer beforehand, and the better the customer is linked to business networks. Moreover, in the absence of reliable legal enforcement, firms often agree to renegotiate contracts following a breach, implying that retaliation is not as forceful as predicted in repeated games models and not as effective as sanctions, even though community sanctions are occasionally invoked.

Together with Simon Johnson and Daniel Kaufmann, Woodruff and McMillan also explore the legal system in post-communist countries. Comparing post-communist Russia and Ukraine to Poland, Slovakia and Romania, they find the size of 'unofficial' activity to be much larger in the former two than in the latter three, mostly due to higher effective tax rates, worse bureaucratic corruption, grater incidence of mafia protection, and less trust in the court system; the central role of entrepreneurs in transition economies is further explored by Woodruff and McMillan in a JEP article. Overall, Woodruff, Johnson and McMillan argue that weak property rights rather than insufficient access to finance were the main binding constraint for private sector investment into post-communist countries in the 1990s, as weak property rights discourage entrepreneurs from reinvesting their profits. Similarly, they also demonstrate the importance of trust into well-functioning courts for investment: while relationships can sustain existing interactions, workable courts support the creation of new business relationships.

=== Research on enterprises in developing countries ===
Another key area of Woodruff's research are (micro-)enterprises in developing countries and constraints to their growth. For instance, Woodruff and McKenzie find that start-up costs of Mexican microenterprises tend to be very low and returns to capital high, suggesting that entry costs are unlikely to provide an empirical basis for poverty traps. In further research, Woodruff and McKenzie randomly provided Mexican retail SMEs with cash and in-kind grants, which led to estimated returns to capital of at least 20-33% per month, with the effects being concentrated among those firms with the highest financial constraints. Together with Luc Laeven, Woodruff has also found a positive relationship between the size of firms in Mexico and the quality of the legal system, especially for proprietorships.

Much of Woodruff's research on microenterprises has been conducted with Suresh de Mel and McKenzie in Sri Lanka. In one study, after randomly assigning cash grants to microentrepreneurs, they find annual real returns to capital of 55-63% per year, i.e., much higher than prevailing market interest rates, with the returns varying by entrepreneurial ability and household wealth, but not by risk aversion, suggesting that insufficient access to credit might not be a key constraint. Faced with the difficulty of measuring profits, they find that simply asking firms about their profits offers a more accurate measure than detailed questions on revenues and expenses, as firms tend to underreport a nearly a third of their revenues, and that while providing entrepreneurs with account diaries helps address that issue, it doesn't significantly change reported profits. Moreover, the positive returns to capital are found to be completely concentrated among enterprises owned by men, a fact that cannot be explained by differences in the entrepreneurs' characteristics, but rather suggests that capital given to female entrepreneurs is more likely to be consumed or misinvested by other household members. In further work on this issue, they randomly offer both existing and potential female microentrepreneurs either the ILO's Start-and-Improve Your Business (SIYB) programme or a combination of SIYB training and a cash grant, then finding that the training only has an impact on business profitability for new entrepreneurs and that the impact of the combined support dissipates in the second year. In a comprehensive review of research on business trainings in developing countries, Woodruff and McKenzie conclude that business trainings generally have only modest impacts on existing firms, partly because firm owners' application of the taught practices is often limited, though trainings seem to help prospective entrepreneurs launch start-ups faster and better. Together with McKenzie and de Mel, Woodruff has argued most microentrepreneurs ("own account workers") are more akin to wage workers than larger firm owners, suggesting that most of them - unlike e.g. Hernando de Soto's argument - are merely waiting for wage work and unlikely to become employers. Another key finding related to Sri Lankan firms is that providing informal enterprises with payments equivalent to two months of the profits of the median firm leads to registration of half of the firms, whereas the mere provision of information about the registration process and possibility of getting reimbursed for registration costs has no impact; land ownership issues are raised as the most common reason for not registering.

Finally, more recently, when comparing the impact of cash and in-kind grants on the profitability of microenterprises in urban Ghana, Woodruff, Marcel Fafchamps, McKenzie and Simon Quinn found a flypaper effect whereby - unlike cash - capital coming directly into the business "sticks" there, though neither type of grants has an impact on enterprise profitability when provided to female subsistence entrepreneurs.

=== Further research on Latin America ===
Further work by Woodruff has addressed the informal sector wage gap in Mexico, El Salvador and Peru (with Douglas Marcouiller and Veronica Ruiz de Castilla), the impact of Mexican emigration on educational attainment in emigrant households (with Gordon Hanson), the impact of migration networks on Mexican microenterprises (with Rene Zenteno), and the impact of remittances on the breadth and depth of the Mexican banking sector (with Asli Demirgüç-Kunt, Ernesto López Córdova, and María Soledad Martínez Pería).
