= David McKenzie (economist) =

New Zealander economist

- Occupation: Economist
- Website: sites.google.com/site/decrgdmckenzie/

David McKenzie is a lead economist at the World Bank's Development Research Group, Finance and Private Sector Development Unit in Washington, D.C. His research topics include migration, microenterprises, and methodology for use with developing country data.

McKenzie is also a contributor to the World Bank's Development Impact blog and affiliated with the International Growth Centre and Innovations for Poverty Action.

== Biography ==
McKenzie received his B.A. (B.Com.) from the University of Auckland in New Zealand and his Ph.D. in economics from Yale University. He spent four years as an assistant professor at Stanford University before joining the World Bank. He is currently on the editorial boards of the Journal of Development Economics, World Bank Economic Review, Journal of Economic Perspectives, and Migration Studies.

McKenzie also co-authored a write-up with Berk Ozler on the impact of economics blogs. His findings were discussed by Tyler Cowen on Marginal Revolution.

== Research ==
McKenzie's research focuses on migration, private sector development, and data methodology. According to IDEAS/RePEc, McKenzie belongs to the top 1% of economists in terms of research output. He frequently co-authors with Christopher Woodruff, John Gibson, Steven Stillman and Suresh de Mel. He has notably conducted research in Mexico, India and Sri Lanka.

=== Research on migration ===
One of the main fields of McKenzie's research is migration, with much of his research concentrating on migration between Mexico and the United States. A key theme of that research is that the impact of migration goes far beyond remittances and includes e.g. impacts on child health, the ability of others to migrate, community inequality, and incentives for education. For instance, in work with Nicole Hildebrandt, McKenzie finds that migration improves child health by increasing rural Mexican households of emigrants both by raising their wealth and health knowledge. In another study with Hillel Rapoport in rural Mexico, McKenzie finds that migration depresses schooling attendance and attainment as boys emigrate and girls take up more household tasks. In further work, McKenzie and Rapoport have explored the role of migrant networks in Mexico, which are found to substantially decrease the costs for future migrants and overall reduce inequality across communities with high levels of past migration. Moreover, McKenzie and Rapoport also observe that the presence of migrant networks drives self-selection, with Mexican communities with strong migrant networks "sending" typically less educated members to the US compared with communities with weaker networks, in line with Borjas (1987) and Chiquiar and Hanson (2005).

Another nexus of McKenzie's research on migration has been migration in the Pacific. In work with John Gibson, McKenzie notably found that the desire to maximize income cannot explain migration patterns among the very highly skilled, with many potential emigrants - especially those more risk averse, impatient or inept at foreign languages - deciding not to emigrate despite very high returns to migration, whereas many emigrants - especially those with strong ties to homebound family or who didn't emigrate for reasons of lifestyle - choose to return even though doing so implies forgoing large sums of income. In another study, McKenzie, Gibson and Steven Stillman analyze the effects of a Tongan migration lottery program to New Zealand, finding a negative impact of emigration on the resources of remaining household members, as remittances don't fully offset the shortfall in labour earnings; more generally, this suggests that comparisons of migrant and non-migrant households are likely to be biased due to self-selection of both households and household members into migration. By contrast, when studying the impact of New Zealand's seasonal worker programme on households in Tonga and Vanuatu, McKenzie and Gibson observe it to strongly improve those households' income, consumption, savings and standard of living.

Most recently, in research with Rapoport, Albert Bollard and Melanie Morten, McKenzie has challenged concerns that educated migrants remit less, finding instead that - while results differ across destinations - more educated migrants remit on average more, with the effect within that group being mainly attributable to the higher income itself rather than to background characteristics. Finally, in a popular article addressing questions around brain drain, McKenzie and Gibson highlight that brain drain has remained relatively stable over time, that skilled and unskilled migration are strongly correlated, that the likelihood of brain drain increases the lower domestic standards of living, security, political stability and opportunities for rewarding careers, and that examples of brain gain exist, among else.

=== Research on enterprises in developing countries ===
Another key area of McKenzie's research are (micro-)enterprises in developing countries and constraints to their growth. For instance, McKenzie and Christopher Woodruff find that start-up costs of Mexican microenterprises tend to be very low and returns to capital high, suggesting that entry costs are unlikely to provide an empirical basis for poverty traps. With regard to management practices, McKenzie, Nicholas Bloom, Aprajit Mahajan and John Roberts argue that the lack of good management practices (e.g. monitoring, target-setting or incentives) and owners' reluctance to delegate decision making to managers constrain the productivity growth of large firms in developing countries. In further research on Indian textile plants, McKenzie, Bloom, Mahajan, Roberts and Benn Eifert find these plants to often still rely on informal management practices because of a mix of lack of both information and competition, but that the adoption of better practices leads to large and sustained gains in productivity.

Much of McKenzie's research on microenterprises has been conducted with Suresh de Mel and Woodruff in Sri Lanka. In one study, after randomly assigning cash grants to microentrepreneurs, they find annual real returns to capital of 55-63% per year, i.e., much higher than prevailing market interest rates, with the returns varying by entrepreneurial ability and household wealth, but not by risk aversion, suggesting that insufficient access to credit might not be a key constraint. Faced with the difficulty of measuring profits, they find that simply asking firms about their profits offers a more accurate measure than detailed questions on revenues and expenses, as firms tend to underreport a nearly a third of their revenues, and that while providing entrepreneurs with account diaries helps address that issue, it doesn't significantly change reported profits. Moreover, the positive returns to capital are found to be completely concentrated among enterprises owned by men, a fact that cannot be explained by differences in the entrepreneurs' characteristics, but rather suggests that capital given to female entrepreneurs is more likely to be consumed or misinvested by other household members. In further work on this issue, they randomly offer both existing and potential female microentrepreneurs either the ILO's Start-and-Improve Your Business (SIYB) programme or a combination of SIYB training and a cash grant, then finding that the training only has an impact on business profitability for new entrepreneurs and that the impact of the combined support dissipates in the second year. In a comprehensive review of research on business trainings in developing countries, McKenzie and Woodruff conclude that business trainings generally have only modest impacts on existing firms, partly because firm owners' application of the taught practices is often limited, though trainings seem to help prospective entrepreneurs launch start-ups faster and better. Together with Woodruff and de Mel, McKenzie has argued most microentrepreneurs ("own account workers") are more akin to wage workers than larger firm owners, suggesting that most of them - unlike e.g. Hernando de Soto's argument - are merely waiting for wage work and unlikely to become employers. Another key finding related to Sri Lankan firms is that providing informal enterprises with payments equivalent to two months of the profits of the median firm leads to registration of half of the firms, whereas the mere provision of information about the registration process and possibility of getting reimbursed for registration costs has no impact; land ownership issues are raised as the most common reason for not registering.

Finally, more recently, when comparing the impact of cash and in-kind grants on the profitability of microenterprises in urban Ghana, McKenzie, Woodruff, Marcel Fafchamps, and Simon Quinn found a flypaper effect whereby - unlike cash - capital coming directly into the business "sticks" there, though neither type of grants has an impact on enterprise profitability when provided to female subsistence entrepreneurs.

=== Research on methodology and other topics ===
A third area of McKenzie's research has focused on methodological issues across a range of topics, including the issue of endogeneity regarding migration decisions for the measurement of migration's impact (with Marcin Sasin), the measurement of inequality with household asset indicators through PCA and bootstrapping, the measurement of earnings mobility through dynamic pseudo-panel methods (with Francisca Antman), the superiority of pair-wise matching and stratification over other randomization methods in small samples or for very persistent outcome variables, and the possibility of measuring subjective expectations in developing countries through probabilistic questions (with Adeline Delavande and Xavier Giné). Further important work by McKenzie includes:

- the impact of the privatization of public utilities in the 1980s on customers and workers in Argentina, Mexico, Bolivia and Nicaragua (with Dilip Mookherjee);
- the coping strategies of households (e.g. changes in household structure and labour supply, fertility, child schooling and interhousehold transfers) during the Mexican peso crisis;
- the lack of association between consumption poverty and mental health, with the latter being driven rather by changes in life circumstances than the level of poverty (with Jishu Das, Quy-Toan Do, Jed Friedman and Kinnon Scott);
- the status, reform options and possible lessons for other low-income countries of urban water supply in India (with Isha Ray);
- the lack of widespread evidence on poverty traps and on their commonly posited mechanisms of action (with Aart Kraay).

== Reception ==
McKenzie was listed as one of the "40 under 40 International Development Leaders" by devex. Tim Ogden interviewed McKenzie for his book Experimental Conversations, and parts of the interview were published on the Philanthropy Action website. The Financial Access Initiative also published an interview of McKenzie.

McKenzie has been cited in The New York Times, The Wall Street Journal, and Financial Times.
