= Frédéric Docquier =

Belgian economist (born 1967)

- Born: 27 April 1967 (age 59); Huy, Belgium
- Occupations: Belgian economist and Professor of Economics at the Catholic University of Louvain
- Website: https://sites.google.com/view/fredericdocquier//

Frédéric Docquier (born in Huy (Belgium) on April 27, 1967) is a Belgian economist and Professor of Economics at the Catholic University of Louvain (UCLouvain). He ranks as one of the leading economists in the field of international migration, with a focus on brain drain and skilled migration.

== Biography ==
After shortly working as a research assistant at the University of Liège and acquiring an M.A. in economics from the Catholic University of Louvain (UCLouvain) in 1991, Frédéric Docquier did a Ph.D. at the University of the Mediterranean on the topic of public pensions and population ageing under Philippe Michel and Maurice Marchand, graduating in 1995. After a short position as lecturer in Liège, he became a senior lecturer at the University of Lille II in 1997, where he obtained his habilitation under the supervision of Bruno Amable in 2000. Since 2005, Docquier has been a professor of economics at UCLouvain and a research associate of the National Fund for Economic Research, with positions as a visiting professor at e.g. the universities of Paris 1, Clermont-Ferrand, Nantes, Bordeaux IV and Luxembourg. Moreover, Docquier is also affiliated through research fellowships with IZA, CreAM, FERDI, and the Global Labor Organization. Most recently, in 2019, Docquier has taken over the leadership of the Crossing Borders research programme at the Luxembourg Institute of Socio-Economic Research (LISER). Regarding his editorial activities, Docquier is a present (May 2019) member of the editorial boards of the Journal of Demographic Economics and the review Regards Économiques and a former member of the editorial board of the World Bank Economic Review. His research has been awarded the Milken Institute Award for Distinguished Economic Research (2003) and the Developing Countries Prize 2008 of the KfW.

== Research ==
Frédéric Docquier's research interests include quantitivative development theory, economic growth and, especially, international migration. In terms of research output, he ranks among the top 2% of economists on IDEAS/RePEc. In his research, Frédéric Docquier has frequently collaborated with Hillel Rapoport and Michel Beine. Together with Rapoport and Michel Beine, Docquier explores under which conditions brain drain could increase economic growth, arguing that a "beneficial brain drain" occurs when potential emigrants' additional investments into their education because of hopes for higher returns abroad - the "brain effect" - outweighs the "drain effect", i.e., the decrease in human capital due to actual emigration. Using new data sources on international skilled migration, they find evidence for this effect in further research on skilled migration from developing countries, wherein those combining low levels of schooling with low emigration rates experience a beneficial brain drain. In a comprehensive review of economics research on the brain drain, Docquier and Rapoport find that high-skill emigration "need not deplete a country's human capital stock and can generative positive network externalities".

More recently, in work with Caglar Ozden and Giovanni Peri, Docquier has investigated the labour market effects of migration in OECD countries during the 1990s, finding a positive effect of immigration on the wages of less educated natives and no effect on average native wages, while emigration decreased the wages of less educated native workers and increased inequality within countries. In another recent study with Beine and Maurice Schiff, Docquier analyses the relationship between international migration and fertility rates in migrants' countries of origin, notably finding that a 1% decrease in the fertility norms to which migrants are exposed reduces home country fertility by about 0.3%, suggesting a transfer of norms from destination to home countries.

== Bibliography (selected works) ==
- Boeri, T., Brücker, H., Docquier, F., Rapoport, H. (2012). Brain drain and brain gain: the global competition to attract high-skilled migrants. Oxford: Oxford University Press.
- Docquier, F., Marfouk, A. (2004). Measuring the international mobility of skilled workers (1990-2000). Washington, DC: World Bank.
- Rapoport, H., Docquier, F. (2006). The economics of migrants' remittances. Handbook of the Economics of Giving, Altruism, and Reciprocity, vol 2.. pp. 1135–1198.
- Docquier, F., Lohest, O., Marfouk, A. (2007). Brain drain in developing countries. World Bank Economic Review, 21(2), pp. 193–218.
- Docquier, F., Rapoport, H. (2007). Skilled migration: The Perspective of Developing Countries. IZA Discussion Paper Series, No. 2873.
- Docquier, F. (2007). Brain drain and inequality across nations. Revue d'économie du développement, 15.
- Beine, M., Docquier, F., Ozden, C. (2009). Diasporas. Washington, DC: World Bank.
- Docquier, F., Lowell, B.L., Marfouk, A. (2009). A gendered assessment of highly skilled emigration. Population and Development Review, 35(2), pp. 297–321.
- Docquier, F., Lodigiani, E. (2010). Skilled migration and business networks. Open Economies Review, 21(4), pp. 565–588.
- Docquier, F. et al. (2011). Emigration and democracy. Washington, DC: World Bank.
- Boeri, T. et al. (2012). Brain drain and brain gain: the global competition to attract high-skilled migrants.
- Artuc, E. et al. (2014). A global assessment of human capital mobility: the role of non-OECD destinations. World Bank
