= Costas Azariadis =

Greek macroeconomist

- Born: 17 February 1943 (age 83); Athens, Greece

Academic background
- Doctoral advisor: Edward C. Prescott; Robert Lucas

Academic work
- Doctoral students: Russell W. Cooper

Constantine Christos "Costas" Azariadis (Greek: Κώστας Αζαριάδης; born February 17, 1943) is a macroeconomist born in Athens, Greece. He has worked on numerous topics, such as labor markets, business cycles, and economic growth and development. Azariadis originated and developed implicit contract theory.

== Education ==
Azariadis studied engineering in the National Technical University of Athens before earning his MBA and PhD in economics at Carnegie Mellon during 1969–1973. His doctoral dissertation at Carnegie Mellon was advised by Edward C. Prescott and Robert Lucas. His dissertation won him the Alexander Henderson Award for excellence in economics, an award also won by Nobel Laureates Oliver Williamson, Dale T. Mortensen, Finn Kydland and Edward Prescott.

== Academic trajectory ==
He was an assistant professor at Brown during 1973–76, a visiting researcher at Hebrew University in 1977, then at University of Pennsylvania during 1977–92. He was appointed professor at UCLA in 1992. On July 1, 2006, he was made Edward Mallinckrodt Distinguished Professor in Arts & Sciences at the Economics Department of Washington University in St. Louis while retaining a position at UCLA as a professor emeritus. The same year, he became a research fellow at the Federal Reserve Bank of St. Louis. Azariadis was elected a Fellow of the Econometric Society in 1989.

== Contributions to economics ==
=== Implicit contract theory ===
Azariadis originated implicit contract theory. He proved that wage rigidities may represent a mechanism by which firms insure workers against risk, thus showing that wage rigidity was not necessarily evidence in favor of the Keynesian theory. Later Azariadis demonstrated that there are ways in which uncertainty is structured that imply that wages cannot perform their risk insurance role and simultaneously produce full employment. This result aided the Keynesian theory by providing a coherent microeconomic explanation of unemployment.

=== Poverty trap ===
Azariadis formalized and developed the idea of poverty trap. He showed that there would be multiple equilibria arising from threshold externalities in the overlapping generations model, and some of the equilibria are associated with long-lasting poverty. This novel idea envisioned the possibility of convergence clubs.

=== Self-fulfilling prophecies ===
Azariadis contributed to clarifying the concept of sunspot equilibrium developed by David Cass and Karl Shell. He generalized it in the name of "Self-fulfilling prophecies" which consist of a belief system consistent with the rational expectations equilibrium. By doing that, he could demonstrate fluctuations can emerge endogenously in a neoclassical model of equilibrium in which prices are flexible and expectations are rational.

== Major publications ==
- Azariadis, C. 1975. Implicit contracts and underemployment equilibria. Journal of Political Economy, 83: 1183-1202
- Azariadis, C. 1976. On the Incidence of Unemployment, Review of Economic Studies (February): 115-125.
- Azariadis, C. 1981. A Re-examination of Natural Rate Theory, American Economic Review (December): 946-960.
- Azariadis, C. 1981. Self-Fulfilling Prophecies, Journal of Economic Theory, (December): 380-396.
- Azariadis, C. 1983. Employment With Asymmetric Information, Quarterly Journal of Economics (Supplement): 157-172.
- Azariadis, C. and R. Guesnerie, 1986. Sunspots and Cycles, Review of Economic Studies (October): 725-738.
- Azariadis, C. and A. Drazen, 1990. Threshold Externalities in Economic Development, Quarterly Journal of Economics (May 1990): 501-526.
- Azariadis, C. 1996. The Economics of Poverty Traps, Part One: Complete Markets, Journal of Economic Growth, (December): 449-486.
- Azariadis, C. and B. Smith. 1998. Financial Intermediation and Regime Switching in Business Cycles, American Economic Review, (June): 516-536.
- Azariadis, C. and L. Lambertini. 2003. Endogenous Debt Constraints in Lifecycle Economies, Review of Economic Studies: 461-488.
- Azariadis, C., J. Bullard, and L. Ohanian. 2004. Trend-Reverting Fluctuations in the Life-Cycle Model, Journal of Economic Theory: 334-356.

Author of:

- Intertemporal Macroeconomics. Oxford: Blackwell Publishers, February 1993. ISBN 1-55786-366-0

== Sources ==
- Durlauf, Steven N. (2007). "An Interview with Costas Azariadis". Macroeconomic Dynamics. 11 (2): 249–271. doi:10.1017/S1365100507050390. S2CID 153592986.
