= Journal of Economic Theory =

- Discipline: Economics
- Language: English
- Edited by: Alessandro Pavan, Ricardo Lagos, Karl Shell, Marciano Siniscalchi, Xavier Vives

Publication details
- History: 1969–present
- Publisher: Elsevier
- Frequency: Bimonthly
- Impact factor: 1.458 (2020)

Standard abbreviations
- ISO 4: J. Econ. Theory
- MathSciNet: J. Econom. Theory

Indexing
- ISSN: 0022-0531
- LCCN: 72009216
- OCLC no.: 644497676

Links
- Journal homepage; Online access; Online archive

The Journal of Economic Theory is a bimonthly peer-reviewed academic journal covering the field of economic theory. Karl Shell has served as editor-in-chief of the journal since it was established in 1968. Since 2000, he has shared the editorship with Jess Benhabib, Alessandro Lizzeri, Christian Hellwig, and more recently with Alessandro Pavan, Ricardo Lagos, Marciano Siniscalchi, and Xavier Vives. The journal is published by Elsevier. In 2020, Tilman Börgers was chief editor of the journal.

== Abstracting and indexing ==
According to the Journal Citation Reports, the journal has a 2020 impact factor of 1.458.

According to Scopus the journal had a citiscore of 2.6 in 2025

2.6	48% 374/731 Economics and Econometrics	1,415	535	63

== See also ==
- List of economics journals
