= Sunspots (economics) =

Extrinsic random variable not affecting economic fundamentals

In economics, the term sunspots (or sometimes "a sunspot") refers to an extrinsic random variable, that is, a random variable that does not affect economic fundamentals (such as endowments, preferences, or technology). Sunspots can also refer to the related concept of extrinsic uncertainty, that is, economic uncertainty that does not come from variation in economic fundamentals. David Cass and Karl Shell coined the term sunspots as a suggestive and less technical way of saying "extrinsic random variable".

== Use ==
The idea that arbitrary changes in expectations might influence the economy, even if they bear no relation to fundamentals, is controversial but has been widespread in many areas of economics. For example, in the words of Arthur C. Pigou,

The varying expectations of business men... and nothing else, constitute the immediate cause and direct causes or antecedents of industrial fluctuations.

'Sunspots' have been included in economic models as a way of capturing these 'extrinsic' fluctuations, in fields like asset pricing, financial crises, business cycles, economic growth, and monetary policy. Experimental economics researchers have demonstrated how sunspots could affect economic activity.

The name is a whimsical reference to 19th-century economist William Stanley Jevons, who attempted to correlate business cycle patterns with sunspot counts (on the actual sun) on the grounds that they might cause variations in weather and thus agricultural output. Subsequent studies have found no evidence for the hypothesis that the sun influences the business cycle. On the other hand, sunny weather has a small but significant positive impact on stock returns, probably due to its impact on traders' moods.

== Sunspot equilibrium ==
In economics, a sunspot equilibrium is an economic equilibrium where the market outcome or allocation of resources varies in a way unrelated to economic fundamentals. In other words, the outcome depends on an "extrinsic" random variable, meaning a random influence that matters only because people think it matters. The sunspot equilibrium concept was defined by David Cass and Karl Shell.

=== Origin of terminology ===
While Cass and Shell's 1983 paper defined the term sunspot in the context of general equilibrium, their use of the term sunspot (a term originally used in astronomy) alludes to the earlier econometric work of William Stanley Jevons, who explored the correlation between the degree of sunspot activity and the price of corn. In Jevons' work, uncertainty about sunspots could be considered intrinsic, for example, if sunspots have some demonstrable effect on agricultural productivity, or some other relevant variable. In modern economics, the term does not indicate any relationship with solar phenomena, and is instead used to describe random variables that have no impact on the preferences, allocations, or production technology of a general equilibrium model. The modern theory suggests that such a nonfundamental variable might have an effect on equilibrium outcomes if it influences expectations.

The possibility of sunspot equilibria is associated with the existence of multiple equilibria in general equilibrium models. The initial formation by Cass and Shell was constructed in the context of a two period model in which a group of people trade financial contacts in period 1 that depends on the realization of a random variable in period 2. They showed that, if some people are unable to participate in the financial market in period 1, the resulting equilibrium in period 2 can depend on the realization of a random variable that is completely unrelated to economic fundamentals. They call the random variable a sunspot and the resulting allocation is a 'sunspot equilibrium’.

=== Occurrence of equilibria ===
Much work on sunspot equilibria aims to prove the possible existence of equilibria differing from a given model's competitive equilibria, which can result from various types of extrinsic uncertainty. The sunspot equilibrium framework supplies a basis for rational expectations modeling of excess volatility (volatility resulting from sources other than randomness in the economic fundamentals). Proper sunspot equilibria can exist in a number of economic situations, including asymmetric information, externalities in consumption or production, imperfect competition, incomplete markets, and restrictions on market participation.

== Sunspots and the Indeterminacy School in Macroeconomics ==
The Cass Shell example relies on the fact that general equilibrium models often possess multiple equilibria. Cass and Shell construct an example with three equilibria in period 2 and they showed that, if a subset of people cannot trade financial securities in period 1, there exist additional equilibria which are constructed as randomizations across the multiple equilibria of the original model. If, in contrast, everyone is present in period 1, these randomizations are not possible as a consequence of the first welfare theorem of economics (Fundamental theorems of welfare economics). Although the model was simple, the assumption of limited participation extends to all dynamic models based on the overlapping generations model.

Sunspot equilibria are important because they introduce the possibility that extraneous uncertainty may cause business cycles. The first paper to exploit this idea is due to Azariadis who introduced the term "self-fulfilling prophecy," a term he borrowed from Robert K. Merton, to refer to a complete dynamic model in which economic fluctuations arise simply because people believe that they will occur. The idea was extended by Roger Farmer and Michael Woodford to a class of autoregressive models and forms the basis for the Indeterminacy School in Macroeconomics.

Sunspot equilibria are closely connected to the possibility of indeterminacy in dynamic economic models. In a general equilibrium model with a finite number of commodities, there is always a finite odd number of equilibria, each of which is isolated from every other equilibrium. In models with an infinite number of commodities, and this includes most dynamic models, an equilibrium can be characterized by a bounded sequence of price vectors. When the set of traders changes over time, as it must in any model with birth and death, there are typically open sets of indeterminate equilibria where, arbitrarily close to one equilibrium, there is another one. Although the initial work in the area was in the context of the overlapping generations model, Jess Benhabib and Farmer and Farmer and Guo showed that representative agent models with increasing returns to scale in production also lead to business cycle models driven by self-fulfilling prophecies.

== See also ==
- Irrational exuberance
- Stock market bubble
- Tulip mania
