= Convergence (economics) =

Hypothesis of faster per-capita income growth for poorer countries

The idea of convergence in economics (also sometimes known as the catch-up effect) is the hypothesis that poorer economies' per capita incomes will tend to grow at faster rates than richer economies. In the Solow-Swan model, economic growth is driven by the accumulation of physical capital until this optimum level of capital per worker, which is the "steady state" is reached, where output, consumption and capital are constant. The model predicts more rapid growth when the level of physical capital per capita is low, something often referred to as “catch up” growth. As a result, all economies should eventually converge in terms of per capita income. Developing countries have the potential to grow at a faster rate than developed countries because diminishing returns (in particular, to capital) are not as strong as in capital-rich countries. Furthermore, poorer countries can replicate the production methods, technologies, and institutions of developed countries.

In economic growth literature the term "convergence" can have two meanings. The first kind (sometimes called "sigma-convergence") refers to a reduction in the dispersion of levels of income across economies. "Beta-convergence" on the other hand, occurs when poor economies grow faster than rich ones. Economists say that there is "conditional beta-convergence" when economies experience "beta-convergence" but conditional on other variables (namely the investment rate and the population growth rate) being held constant. They say that "unconditional beta-convergence" or "absolute beta-convergence" exists when the growth rate of an economy declines as it approaches its steady state. According to Jack Goldstone, "in the twentieth century, the Great Divergence peaked before the First World War and continued until the early 1970s, then, after two decades of indeterminate fluctuations, in the late 1980s it was replaced by the Great Convergence as the majority of Third World countries reached economic growth rates significantly higher than those in most First World countries", thus the present-day convergence should be regarded as a continuation of the Great Divergence.

== Limitations ==
The fact that a country is poor does not guarantee that catch-up growth will be achieved. Moses Abramovitz emphasised the need for 'Social Capabilities' to benefit from catch-up growth. These capabilities include an ability to absorb new technology, attract capital and participate in global markets. According to Abramovitz, these prerequisites must be in place in an economy before catch-up growth can occur, and explain why there is still divergence in the world today.

The theory also assumes that technology is freely traded and available to developing countries that are attempting to catch-up. Capital that is expensive or unavailable to these economies can also prevent catch-up growth from occurring, especially given that capital is scarce in these countries. This often traps countries in a low-efficiency cycle whereby the most efficient technology is too expensive to be acquired. The differences in productivity techniques are what separates the leading developed nations from the following developed nations, but by a margin narrow enough to give the following nations an opportunity to catch-up. This process of catch-up continues as long as the following nations have something to learn from the leading nations, and will only cease when the knowledge discrepancy between the leading and following nations becomes very small and eventually exhausted.

According to Professor Jeffrey Sachs, convergence is not occurring everywhere due to the closed economic policy of some developing countries, which could be solved through free trade and openness. In a study of 111 countries between 1970 and 1989, Sachs and Andrew Warner concluded that the industrialized countries had a growth of 2.3% per year per capita, open economy developing countries 4.5% and closed economy developing countries had only 2%.

Robert Lucas stated the "Lucas paradox" which is the observation that capital is not flowing from developed countries to developing countries despite the fact that developing countries have lower levels of capital per worker. However, this statement has recently received serious objections.

== Examples ==
There are many examples of countries that have converged with developed countries which validate the catch-up theory. Based on case studies on Japan, Mexico and other countries, Nakaoka studied social capabilities for industrialization and clarified the features of human and social attitudes in the catching-up process of Japan in the Meiji period (1868-1912). In the 1960s and 1970s the East Asian Tigers rapidly converged with developed economies. These include Singapore, Hong Kong, South Korea and Taiwan – all of which are today considered developed economies. In the post-war period (1945–1960) examples include West Germany, France and Japan, which were able to quickly regain their prewar status by replacing capital that was lost during World War II.

Some economists criticise the theory, stating that endogenous factors, such as government policy, are much more influential in economic growth than exogenous factors. For example, Alexander Gerschenkron states that governments can substitute for missing prerequisites to trigger catch-up growth. A hypothesis by economic historians Kenneth Sokoloff and Stanley Engerman suggested that factor endowments are a central determinant of structural inequality that impedes institutional development in some countries. Sokoloff and Engerman proposed that in the 19th century, countries such as Brazil and Cuba with rich factor endowments such as soil and climate are predisposed to a guarded franchise with limited institutional growth. Land that is suitable for sugar and coffee such as Cuba experienced economies of scale from the establishment of plantation that in turn created the small elite families with vested interest in guarded franchise. The exogenous suitability of land for wheat versus sugar determines the growth rate for many countries. Therefore, countries with land that is suitable for sugar converge with other countries that also have land that is suitable for growing sugar.

Sokoloff and Engerman explained this convergence in their article "History Lessons: Institutions, Factor Endowments, and Paths of Development in the New World." They explained that the United States and Canada started out as two of the poorest colonies in the New World but grew faster than other countries due to their soil qualities. They argued that the United States and Canada had land suitable for growing wheat which meant that they had small scale farming, since wheat does not benefit from economies of scale, and this led to a relatively equal distribution of wealth and political power enabling the population to vote for broad public education. This differentiated them from countries such as Cuba that had land suitable for growing sugar and coffee. Such countries did benefit from economies of scale and so had large plantation agriculture with slave labor, large income and class inequalities, and limited voting rights. This difference in political power led to little spending on the establishment of institutions such as public schools and slowed down their progress. As a result, countries with relative equality and access to public education grew faster and were able to converge on countries with inequality and limited education.

== Types of convergence ==
As classified by Oded Galor:

- Absolute convergence: Lower initial GDP will lead to a higher average growth rate.

The implication of this is that poverty will ultimately disappear 'by itself'. It does not explain why some nations have had zero growth for many decades (e.g. in Sub-Saharan Africa)

- Conditional convergence: A country's income per worker converges to a country-specific long-run level as determined by the structural characteristics of that country.

The implication is that structural characteristics, and not initial national income, determine the long-run level of GDP per worker. Thus, foreign aid should focus on structure (infrastructure, education, financial system etc.) and there is no need for an income transfer from richer to poorer nations.

- Club convergence: It is possible to observe different "clubs" or groups of countries with similar growth trajectories. Most importantly, several countries with low national income also have low growth rates.

Thus, this is in contrast to the theory of conditional convergence, and would suggest that foreign aid should also include income transfers and that initial income does in fact matter for economic growth.

== See also ==
- Economics
- Investment (economics)
- Return on investment
- Productivity
- Productivity improving technologies (economic history)
- Emerging nation
- Endogenous growth theory

== Bibliography ==
- Global Unconditional Convergence among Larger Economies after 1998?
- Definition of the catch-up effect, from The Economist
- John Matthews, Catch-up strategies and the latecomer effect in industrial development. New Political Economy, 2006.
- Moses Abramovitz, Catching Up, Forging Ahead and Falling Behind. Journal of Economic History, 1986.
- K. Sokoloff and S. Engerman, “Institutions, Factor Endowments, and Paths of Development in the New World,” Journal of Economic Perspectives, (Summer 2000), pp. 217–32.
