= Jess Benhabib =

Turkish economist

- Born: 9 June 1948 (age 78); Istanbul, Turkey

Academic background
- Education: Columbia University
- Influences: Kelvin Lancaster

Academic work
- Discipline: Macroeconomics
- Institutions: New York University
- Website: Information at IDEAS / RePEc

Jess Benhabib (born 9 June 1948) is a professor at New York University, and known for his contributions to growth theory and sunspot equilibria.

== Education and career ==
Benhabib earned his Ph.D. from Columbia University in 1976. He started his teaching career as an assistant professor at University of Southern California. In 1980, he became an associate professor at New York University and remained there ever since. Between 1984 and 1987 he served as Chairman of the Economics Department at NYU.

Benhabib has also been a co-editor of the renowned Journal of Economic Theory.

== Selected publications ==
- ———; Spiegel, Mark M. (1994). "The Role of Human Capital in Economic Development: Evidence from Aggregate Cross-Country Data". Journal of Monetary Economics. 34 (2): 143–173. doi:10.1016/0304-3932(94)90047-7.
- ———; Farmer, Roger E. A. (1994). "Indeterminacy and Increasing Returns" (PDF). Journal of Economic Theory. 63 (1): 19–41. doi:10.1006/jeth.1994.1031.
- ———; Rogerson, Richard; Wright, Randall (1991). "Homework in Macroeconomics: Household Production and Aggregate Fluctuations" (PDF). Journal of Political Economy. 99 (6): 1166–1187. doi:10.1086/261796. JSTOR 2937726. S2CID 153638201.
- Baumol, William J.; ——— (1989). "Chaos: Significance, Mechanism, and Economic Applications". Journal of Economic Perspectives. 3 (1): 77–105. doi:10.1257/jep.3.1.77. JSTOR 1942966.
