= Raouf Boucekkine =

French mathematical economist

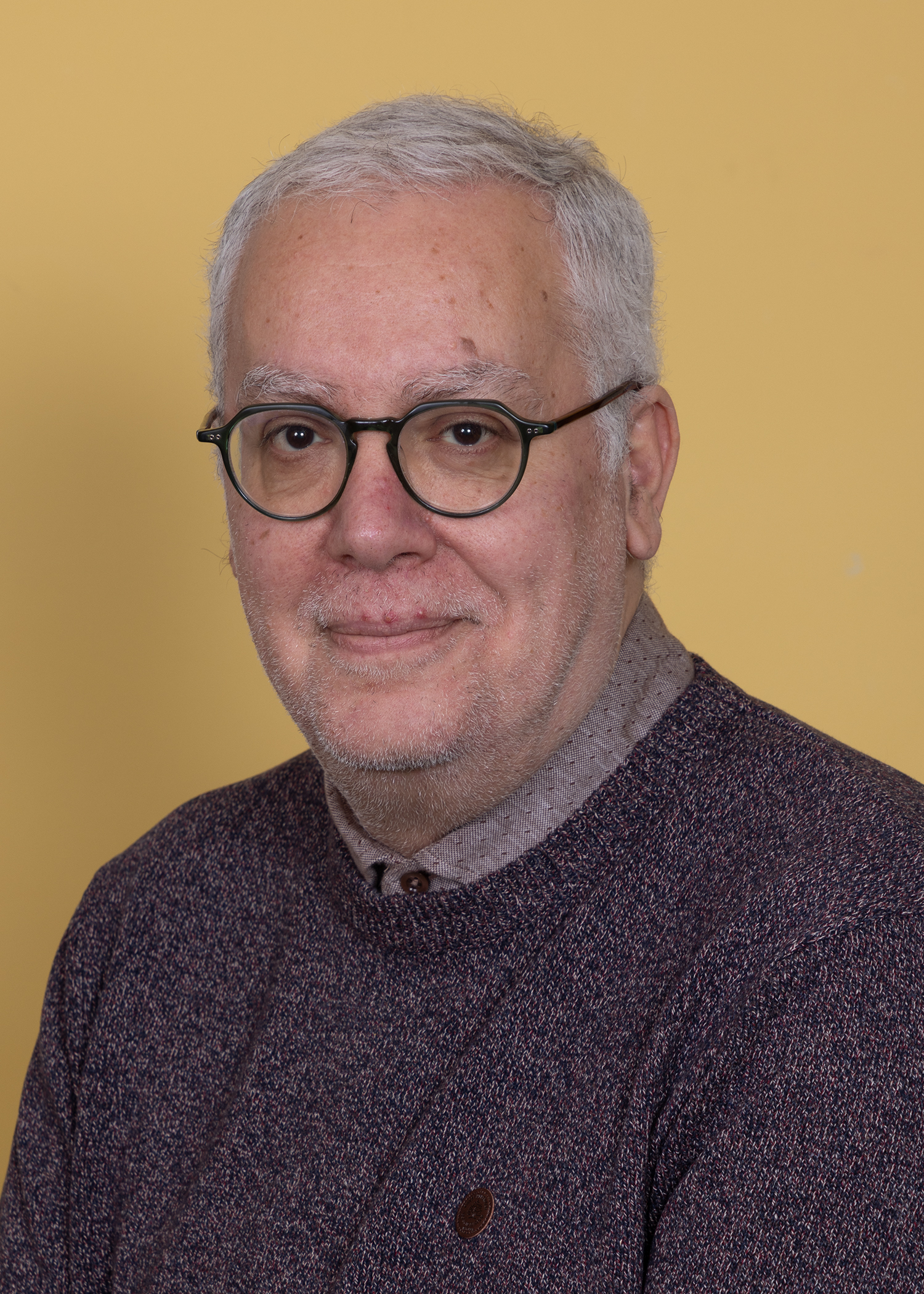
- Known for: Mathematical economics, growth theory, interdisciplinary research

Academic background
- Education: Paris 1 Panthéon-Sorbonne University

Academic work
- Discipline: Mathematical economics
- Sub-discipline: Economic growth Environmental economics Economic epidemiology
- Institutions: Aix-Marseille University; ESC Rennes School of Business; Université catholique de Louvain; Universidad Carlos III de Madrid
- Awards: Senior Fellow, Institut Universitaire de France (2014–2019); Fellow of the Econometric Society (2020); Economic Theory Fellow, Society for the Advancement of Economic Theory (2025); Fellow, Institute of Advanced Study, Durham University (2025); Senior Chair, Institut Universitaire de France (2026–2031)
- Website: Information at IDEAS / RePEc

Raouf Boucekkine is a Belgian–Algerian mathematical economist and professor at the Aix-Marseille School of Economics, Aix-Marseille University. His research focuses on economic growth, environmental economics, economic epidemiology, and mathematical methods, with notable contributions to vintage capital and spatial growth theories.

== Education ==
After completing undergraduate studies in mathematics, Boucekkine pursued studies in statistics and economics at the École nationale de la statistique et de l'administration économique (ENSAE), Paris, graduating in 1990. In the same year, he earned a Master of Arts in Economics from the École des hautes études en sciences sociales (EHESS), Paris. He received his PhD in Economics from Paris 1 Panthéon-Sorbonne University in 1993.

== Academic career ==
Boucekkine began his academic career at Universidad Carlos III de Madrid, where he was appointed assistant professor in 1993 and promoted to associate professor in 1997. In 1998, he joined the Université catholique de Louvain (UCLouvain), first as Associate Professor and later as Professor (Professeur ordinaire). During his tenure at UCLouvain, he was affiliated with the Center for Operations Research and Econometrics (CORE) and the Institut de Recherches Economiques et Sociales (IRES). He also served as Director of the doctoral program in economics from 2000 to 2005.

He subsequently joined the Aix-Marseille School of Economics at Aix-Marseille University, where he holds a professorship. He acted as the first scientific director of Aix-Marseille School of Economics between 2011-2015. From 2015, he was director of IMERA, the Institute for Advanced Study at Aix-Marseille University, he resigned in 2020. Between 2021 and 2024, he was Full Professor at ESC Rennes School of Business, serving as Associate Dean for Research and founding director of the Centre for Unframed Thinking (CUT).

Boucekkine has served as Associate Editor of several academic journals, including Economic Theory, Journal of Economic Dynamics and Control, Macroeconomic Dynamics, Annals of Economics and Statistics, and Journal of Demographic Economics.

== Research work ==
Boucekkine's research focuses on economic growth, environmental economics, and economic epidemiology using optimal control theory, and dynamical systems theory. He has extensively contributed to research in vintage capital models, embodied technological change, and spatial growth theory.

In environmental economics, he has studied pollution, renewable energy, biodiversity, and transboundary externalities, often applying game theory and distributed control theory. In economic epidemiology, he integrates epidemic processes into macroeconomic models to examine interactions between disease, economic activity, and public policy. His work also addresses political economy and institutional change in resource-dependent economies.

Boucekkine has published extensively in peer-reviewed journals and co-edited volumes on resource-rich economies and age-structured optimal control problems. Since 2015, he has been active in interdisciplinary research, coordinating the international research network E3E under the Centre National de la Recherche Scientifique (CNRS). He also contributed to the LBJ (Laffargue–Boucekkine–Juillard) algorithm, which underpins the Dynare software for solving dynamic stochastic general equilibrium models.

== Honors and awards ==
Boucekkine was elected a Fellow of the Econometric Society in 2020 and an Economic Theory Fellow of the Society for the Advancement of Economic Theory in 2025. He served as a Senior Fellow of the Institut Universitaire de France from 2014 to 2019. In 2025, he was a Fellow of the Institute of Advanced Study, Durham University. Boucekkine has been appointed as Senior Chair in Fundamental Research by the Institut Universitaire de France for the period 2026-2031.
