= Cass criterion =

The Cass criterion, also known as the Malinvaud–Cass criterion, is a central result in theory of overlapping generations models in economics. It is named after David Cass.

A major feature which sets overlapping generations models in economics apart from the standard model with a finite number of infinitely lived individuals is that the First Welfare Theorem might not hold—that is, competitive equilibria may be not be Pareto optimal.

If $p_t$ represents the vector of Arrow–Debreu commodity prices prevailing in period $t$ and if

$$\sum_{t=0}^{\infty} \frac{1}{\| p_t \| } < \infty ,$$

then a competitive equilibrium allocation is inefficient.
