= Giovanni Peri =

Italian-born American economist (born 1969)

- Born: September 19, 1969 (age 57); Perugia, Italy
- Citizenship: United States; Italy
- Spouse: Paola Franceschi

Academic background
- Education: Bocconi University (laurea, 1992; doctorate, 1997); University of California, Berkeley (Ph.D., 1998)
- Doctoral advisor: J. Bradford DeLong

Academic work
- Discipline: Labor economics Urban economics
- Institutions: University of California, Davis
- Awards: IZA Research Fellow since 2011
- Website: Information at IDEAS / RePEc

Giovanni Peri (born September 19, 1969, in Perugia, Italy) is an Italian-born American economist who is Professor and Chair of the Department of Economics at the University of California, Davis, where he directs the Global Migration Center. He is also a research associate at the National Bureau of Economic Research and the co-editor of the peer-reviewed Journal of the European Economic Association. He is known for his research on the economic impact of immigration to the United States. He has also researched the economic determinants of international migrations and the Economic impact of immigration in several European Countries. He has challenged and broadened the work of George Borjas, which has argued that immigration has negative economic effects on low educated US workers.

== Research ==
Giovanni Peri's research interests focus on labour economics, with a focus on regional and urban economics as well as on international migration. According to IDEAS/RePEc, he belongs to the 1% of most cited economists. In his research, Peri has frequently collaborated with Gianmarco Ottaviano, Chad Sparber and Francesc Ortega.

=== Research on innovation ===
An early area of Peri's research has been the economics of innovation over time and across space. Together with Laura Bottazzi, he finds only small and very localized innovation spillovers in Europe and estimates that, while doubling R&D spending in a region would raise innovation there by 80-90%, it the effect within a 300 km radius would raise the output of new ideas only by 2-3%. Relatedly, Peri estimates that, on average, only 20% of knowledge in 1975-96 was learned outside the region of origin, and only 9% was learned outside the country of origin, with two notable exceptions: the knowledge in the computer sector and the knowledge generated by technological leaders, both of which flow much farther, especially compared to trade flows. Finally, again with Bottazzi, Peri shows that, in the long run, internationally generated knowledge is an important driver of innovation in a country, with e.g. a 1% positive shock to the log of R&D in the U.S. increasing knowledge creation in other countries by, on average, 0.35% over the next decade.

=== Research on immigration ===
By far, Peri's most prolific field has been the economics of international migration, including through its impact on cultural diversity and task specialization. Exploring the causes and effects of international migrations to OECD countries in 1980–2005, Peri and Francesc Ortega find that bilateral migration flows are increasing in the income gap between origin and destination but decrease when destination countries adopt stricter immigration laws. Moreover, they also find that - on average - immigration increases the total GDP of the destination country in the short run one-for-one, without crowding-out of natives or effect on average wages and average income pr person. More recently, in work with Frédéric Docquier and Caglar Ozden, Peri investigated the labour market effects of migration flows in OECD countries during the 1990s, finding a positive effect of immigration on the wages of less educated natives and no effect on average native wages, while emigration decreased the wages of less educated native workers and increased inequality within countries.

==== Research on immigration to the U.S. ====
With Gianmarco Ottaviano, Peri investigates the relationship between linguistic diversity across U.S. cities and local productivity over 1970–90; together, they find that wages and employment density of U.S.-born workers were systematically higher, all else equal, in cities with higher linguistic diversity, especially for highly educated and for white workers, and that the relationship was strengthened the better non-native speakers were assimilated in terms of language skills and duration of residence. Further research by Peri and Ottaviano on the value of cultural diversity - this time as proxied by the diversity of countries of birth of U.S. residents - suggests that US-born citizens living in metropolitan areas with increasing shares of foreign-born residents experienced significant growth in wages and housing values. Ottaviano's and Peri's thinking about the effects of immigration on natives' wages turns around the notion that natives and foreigners are inherently imperfectly substitutable even within the same skill group. Using this framework, they show that immigration to the U.S. in 1990-2006 had small negative short-run effects on native high school dropouts (-0.7%) and average wages (-0.4%), while raising the wages of native high school dropouts and average native wages in the long run by 0.3% and 0.6%, respectively, but depressing the long-run wages of previous immigrants by 6.7%. In further work with Chad Sparber, Peri demonstrated that U.S. foreign-born workers specialize in occupations characterized by manual-physical labour skills, whereas natives pursue jobs more intensive in communication tasks, which may contribute to the rather modest wage consequences of immigration for less educated native-born workers. In line with this account, another study by Peri with Ottaviano and Greg Wright observed that manufacturing industries with a larger increase in exposure to globalization (through offshoring or immigration) saw improvements in terms of native employment growth relative to less exposed industries. They explain this finding through a model wherein natives, immigrants and offshore workers differ systematically in their ability to apply complex skills and wherein jobs vary in the degree to which their performance requires complex skills. In this framework, the productivity effect related to more efficient task assignment - producers hiring natives, immigrants and offshore workers for different tasks according to their respective comparative advantage - may offset the displacement effect of immigration and offshoring on natives' employment. More recently, Peri has analyzed the long-run impact of immigration on U.S. productivity, with the findings suggesting that immigration promoted total factor productivity growth through task specialization facilitated by the adoption of production technologies aimed at an unskilled workforce; by contrast, Peri didn't find any evidence that immigrants crowded out native employment. This account was further corroborated by research with Sparber and Kevin Shih on the growth of STEM workers across U.S. cities, which found increases in STEM workers to be associated with significant wage gains for natives, especially college-educated natives, as well as with total factor productivity growth.

==== Research on immigration in Europe ====
An early foray into the topic of migration occurred with Andrea Ischino and Sascha Becker, with whom Peri studied the size of the brain drain from Italy, finding that the human capital content of emigrants from Italy increased significantly during the 1990s across regions and age groups. The topic of brain drain was later revisited by Peri in work with Karin Mayr, in which they showed that the combination of return migration and incentives for education related to the prospects of high-skilled migration had the potential to turn emigration's brain drain into a significant brain gain for the country of origin. With regard to the labour market effects of immigration to Western Germany during the 1990s, Peri - together with Ottaviano and Francesco d'Amuri - finds that immigration had a sizeable adverse effect on previous immigrants' employment and a small adverse effect on their wages, while having very little adverse effects on native wages and employments; the authors explain this divergence through the higher substitutability between different groups of immigrants relative to that between immigrants and natives. In further work on the impact of immigrants in Western Europe on the type and quantity of native jobs in 1996–2010, Peri and D'Amuri find that immigrants pushed natives towards more "complex" jobs by crowding them out of manual-routine type of occupations, a job upgrade resulting in - on average - a 0.7% increase in native wages for a doubling of immigrants' share of the labour force; this upgrading process was mitigated by employment protection and slowed but didn't stop during the Great Recession. This finding was further strengthened by research with Mette Foged on Denmark, which showed that an increase in foreign refugees pushed less educated native workers to pursue less manual-intensive occupations and thereby raised native unskilled wages, employment and occupational mobility. Finally, together with Francisco Requena-Silvente, Peri has observed a "trade creation effect" for immigrants in Spain, i.e., immigrants significantly increased the volume of exports, especially for differentiated goods and for exports to countries that are culturally distant from Spain.

=== Other research ===
Further significant studies by Peri include research on human capital externalities, the long-run substitutability between more and less educated workers and the link between regional non-adjustment and fiscal policy:

- Comparing pre-Eurozone patterns of regional adjustment in Germany, Italy, the UK, the U.S., and Canada, Peri and Maurice Obstfeld find that - relative to the U.S. - these countries rely more on transfers between regions and less on labour migration and their adjustment seems to be slower, though adjustments in regional real exchange rates are small in all countries; consequently, Peri and Obstfeld argue that EU Member States will be tempted to create a transfer union, to which they propose an alternative involving a relaxed Stability Pact, further restrictions on central EU borrowing, labour market and fiscal reforms, and the issuance of national debts indexed to nominal GDP.
- Estimating the aggregate long-run elasticity of substitution between more educated and less educated workers in the U.S. over 1950–90 by using time- and state-dependent child labour and compulsory schooling laws as instruments, Peri and Antonio Ciccone find it to be around 1.5;
- Using a novel approach to identify the externalities of human capital, Peri and Ciccone find no evidence of significant average-schooling externalities across U.S. cities and states in 1970–90;
