= Implicit contract theory =

Economic theory of voluntary agreements

In economics, implicit contracts refer to voluntary and self-enforcing long term agreements made between two parties regarding the future exchange of goods or services. Implicit contracts theory was first developed to explain why there are quantity adjustments (layoffs) instead of price adjustments (falling wages) in the labor market during recessions.

The origins of implicit-contract theory lie in the belief that observed movements in wages and employment cannot be adequately explained by a competitive spot labour-market in which wages are always equal to the marginal product of labour and the labour market is always in equilibrium.

In the context of the labor market, an implicit contract is an employment agreement between an employer and an employee that specifies how much labor is supplied by the worker and how much wage is paid by the employer under different circumstances in the future. An implicit contract can be an explicitly written document or a tacit agreement (some people call the former an "explicit contract"). The contract is self-enforcing, meaning that neither of the two parties would be willing to breach the implicit contract in absence of any external enforcement since both parties would be worse off otherwise.

The interpersonal negotiation and agreement in implicit contracts contrasts with the impersonal and nonnegotiable decision making in decentralized competitive markets. As Arthur Melvin Okun puts it: a contract market is like an "invisible handshake" rather than the invisible hand.

== Implicit contracts in the labor market ==
=== Layoff puzzle ===
In traditional economic theory, a worker takes their wage as given and decides how many hours they work. The firm also takes the wage as given and decides how much labor to buy. Then wage is determined in the market to ensure total labor supply equals total labor demand. If workers supply more labor than firms demand, then the wage level should fall so that workers will work fewer hours and firms would demand more labor. Hence, when firms reduce labor demand during a recession, we should expect to see a fall in wages as well. However, in reality, firms layoff redundant workers while keeping the wage unchanged for the rest of the workforce, and the wage compensation fluctuates considerably less than employment does in a typical business cycle. Therefore, the law of supply and demand is insufficient to explain patterns in wages and employment.

=== Implicit contracts as insurance ===
In an effort to explain the layoff puzzle, models with implicit contracts were independently developed by Martin Baily, Donald Gordon, and Costas Azariadis in 1974 and 1975. In their models, the firm and its workers are not simply the buyer and sellers of labor service in a sequential spot market; Instead, the employer and workers engage in a long term relationship that enables risk sharing. The key insight (or assumption) is that the employers are risk neutral while the workers are risk averse. This difference in attitude towards risk enables both parties to benefit from a long term employment relationship. Under the implicit contract, a worker is able to reduce the fluctuation in their labor income and the employer is able to increase their average profit. Hence, both parties are better off than being in the spot market. Therefore, the implicit contract between a worker and an employer is like insurance used to hedge the risk in the spot labor market. Layoffs act as the insurance premium that workers pay for the stability in the insurance schedule in the long run.

=== Decline of the theory in labor economics ===
Despite the popularity of implicit contract theory in the 1980s, applications of the implicit contracts theory in labor economics has been in decline since the 1990s. The theory has been replaced by search and matching theory to explain labor market imperfections.

== Implicit contracts in capital market ==
Capital market shares some of the "imperfections" of the labor market discussed above: long term relationships between banks and borrowers act like the long term employment relationship between an employer and their workers. Like layoffs in the labor market, there is credit rationing in the financial market. Also, a typical loan contract is just like an employment contract illustrated in the model above: the loan repayment is fixed in all states of nature as long as the borrower is solvent. Hence naturally, economists tried to extend and apply the implicit contract theory to explain these phenomena in the capital market.

The earliest studies to employ implicit contracts models in capital markets see the existence of credit rationing as part of an equilibrium risk-sharing arrangement between a bank and its customer: the bank is risk neutral, and the borrower is risk averse, hence they gain from a long term relationship via shifting the interest rate risk from the borrower to the bank. If loans are negotiated in the spot market, then the borrower would be exposed to fluctuations in the spot market interest rates on her loan. Instead, if the borrower engages in an implicit contract with a bank, the bank can shield the borrower from fluctuations in the spot market by offering her a constant rate on the loan and in return for a higher average interest rate in the long run. However, if every bank charges a higher interest rate than the average rate in the spot market, then there would be credit rationing. This approach hinges on the assumption that agents (bank and the borrower) have different attitudes towards risk. However, more recent studies of capital markets do not rely on different attitudes towards risk, instead they focus on asymmetric information and the default risk in the capital markets. Also, implicit contracts have been playing an important role in explaining credit rationing under asymmetric information.

=== Implicit contracts under adverse selection ===
Some argue that the creditor-debtor long term relationship arises from the valuable "inside information" revealed via repeated bank-firm interactions. This "inside information" reduces the information asymmetries and identifies the most productive firms (those with lower default risks). Hence the bank is able to better allocate financial resources and ensure that more capital goes to higher quality firms. This view is usually referred to as relationship banking, and it has attracted significant research interests in the field of finance. The empirical evidence for relationship banking is mixed. A recent study shows "that repeated borrowing from the same lender translates into a 10–17 basis points lowering of loan spreads and that relationships are especially valuable when borrower transparency is low" by using data from the US. However, using survey data from Japan, another recent study finds that the long term relationship between borrower and lender "in some cases increased cost, from stronger relationships for opaque borrowers and for borrowers who get funding from small banks. These latter findings suggest the possibility that relationship borrowers may suffer from capture effects".

=== Implicit contracts under moral hazard ===
The relationship banking approach focuses on adverse selection as the main consequence of the information imperfection between lender and the borrower; however, there is also the problem of moral hazard. In general there are two moral hazard problems related to the capital market. First, borrowers could lie about their financial situation and not repay their debts in full. If the lender could not check whether the borrower is lying, then there might not be any lending in the market at all, especially when the debt is unsecured. Second, when a borrower, for example, a firm makes a bad decision that leads to its bankruptcy, it does not bear the full consequence of her mistake since part of the cost will be borne by the bank that helps finance the project. Therefore, the firm is likely to make riskier decisions when the investment is financed by a bank than when the investment is financed out of the firm's own pocket. Economists show that these problems could be solved by an implicit contract in which the borrower has to pay some costs when she defaults on the debt. The borrower's cost of default can be the expense of hiring lawyers and accountants to persuade the lender of her financial distress, exclusion from capital market and future borrowing, or economic sanctions if the borrower is a country. However, since some of these costs will reduce the amount collectible to the lender in the bankruptcy, the expected rate of return is lower than if there were no moral hazard problems. Therefore, the investment level would also be lower, causing credit rationing in the size of loans.

=== Implicit contracts in current research ===
Credit rationing in the size of loans is also known as borrowing constraints. In recent years, many macroeconomists have become interested in firm level data and firm behaviors. There is widespread evidence supporting the conjecture that borrowing constraints may be important determinants of firm growth and survival. Many of these studies model borrowing constraint as a consequence of an optimal implicit contract when there is asymmetric information between the borrower and lender. Thus, despite its declining popularity among labor economists, implicit contract theory still plays an important role in understanding capital market imperfections.
