= Hillel Rapoport =

French economist

- Occupation: Economist
- Website: https://www.parisschoolofeconomics.eu/en/rapoport-hillel/

Hillel Rapoport (Hebrew: הלל רפפורט) is an economist at the University of Paris 1 Pantheon-Sorbonne and Paris School of Economics. He specializes in the dynamics of migration and its impact on economic development as well as on the economics of immigration, diversity, and refugees' relocation and resettlement and ranks as one of the leading economists on the topic of migration.

== Biography ==
Hillel Rapoport received his Ph.D in economics from the University of Paris II in 1993, followed by a habilitation at the University of Versailles. From 1993 and 1997, respectively, until 2013, Rapoport had twin positions at the University of Lille and Bar-Ilan University, where he was Maitre de conferences, lecturer, associate professor, and professor. Additionally, he also held positions as a visiting scholar at Stanford University and Harvard University during that time. In 2013, Rapoport obtained a professorship at the Paris School of Economics as part of the University of Paris 1 Pantheon-Sorbonne, where he is the deputy director of the Global Political Economy Research Group. Moreover, he has been a scientific advisor to the French Prime Minister as part of CEPII since 2016 and chairs the department on economics and demography at the Institut des Migrations. In terms of editorial duties, he sits on the editorial boards of the Journal of Population Economics and International Economics and has guest-edited many issues in other economic journals. He is or has been affiliated with the research institutes CReAM (UCL), IfW, CEPREMAP, CID, IZA Institute of Labor Economics, CESifo, and the European Development Network, among others. In a comprehensive review of economics research on the brain drain, Docquier and Rapoport find that high-skill emigration "need not deplete a country's human capital stock and can generative positive network externalities".

== Research ==
Hillel Rapoport's research centres on the nexus of migration and demography, development and political economy. In terms of research, he belongs to the top 2% of all economists registered on IDEAS/RePEc. His research has notably won the Milken Institute Award for Distinguished Economic Research and the Developing Countries Prize of the University of Göttingen. In his research, he frequently collaborates with Frédéric Docquier from the Université Catholique de Louvain.

=== Research on brain drain and skilled migration ===
Together with Michel Beine and Docquier, Rapoport explores under which conditions brain drain could increase economic growth, arguing that a "beneficial brain drain" occurs when potential emigrants' additional investments into their education because of hopes for higher returns abroad - the "brain effect" - outweighs the "drain effect", i.e., the decrease in human capital due to actual emigration. They find evidence for this effect in further research on skilled migration from developing countries, wherein those combining low levels of schooling with low emigration rates experience a beneficial brain drain. In a more recent study with David McKenzie, Albert Bollard and Melanie Morten, Rapoport finds that more educated people tend to remit more, conditional on remitting at all.

=== Research on migration selectivity ===
Another topic in Rapoport's research has been migration selectivity, which conceives of migration as a (self-)selective process. For instance, in work with Ravi Kanbur, Rapoport has developed a model with selectivity by education, wherein human capital may develop either way depending on the endo- or exogeneity of education and where past migration increase the incentives for prospective migrants to emigrate, thereby helping the model to explain the evolution of spatial inequalities in the face of ongoing migration from poor to rich areas. These network effects are further explored in work with McKenzie in Mexico, where they are found to decrease the costs for future migrants and overall reduce inequality across communities with high levels of past migration. Moreover, Rapoport and McKenzie also find evidence suggesting that the presence of migrant networks drives self-selection, with Mexican communities with strong migrant networks "sending" typically less educated members to the US compared with communities with weaker networks, in line with Borjas (1987) and Chiquiar and Hanson (2005).

=== Other research ===
- In an analysis of the relationship between birthplace diversity and economic prosperity with Alberto Alesina and Johann Harnoss, Rapoport finds that birthplace diversity is unassociated with ethnic, linguistic or genetic diversity and that the diversity of immigrants is correlated with economic prosperity, especially for skilled, culturally proximate immigrants, suggesting complementarities between the skills of immigrants and natives.
- Investigating with Maurice Kugler whether international labor and capital flows are complements or substitutes, Rapoport argues that foreign direct investment and migration substitute each other at the global level, while highlighting that migrants provide information about future investment opportunities in their countries of origin.

== Bibliography (selected works) ==
- Boeri, T., Brücker, H., Docquier, F., Rapoport, F. (2012, eds.). Brain Drain and Brain Gain: The Global Competition to Attract High-Skilled Migrants. Oxford: Oxford University Press.
