= World Bank Economic Review =

- Discipline: Development economics
- Language: English
- Edited by: Eric Edmonds and Nina Pavcnik

Publication details
- History: 1986–present
- Frequency: Quarterly
- Impact factor: 2.5 (2022)

Standard abbreviations
- ISO 4: World Bank Econ. Rev.

Indexing
- ISSN: 0258-6770 (print); 1564-698X (web)

Links
- Journal homepage; Online access

The World Bank Economic Review is a quarterly, peer-reviewed, development economics journal. It publishes a on a wide range of development related economics topics with an intended audience of both economists and other social scientists. The journal is supported by the World Bank but the journal's claims that consistency with the policy of the World Bank plays no role in the selection of articles for publication. Its editors-in-chief are Eric Edmonds and Nina Pavcnik both or Dartmouth College.
