= Karl Shell =

American economist

Academic background
- Education: Stanford University; Princeton University
- Doctoral advisor: Kenneth Arrow; Hirofumi Uzawa

Academic work
- Institutions: Cornell University; University of Pennsylvania; MIT
- Website: Information at IDEAS / RePEc

Karl Shell (born May 10, 1938) is an American theoretical economist, specializing in macroeconomics and monetary economics.

Shell received an A.B. in mathematics from Princeton University in 1960. He earned his Ph.D. in economics in 1965 at Stanford University, where he studied under Nobel Prize in Economics winner Kenneth Arrow and Hirofumi Uzawa.

Shell is currently Robert Julius Thorne Professor of Economics at Cornell University (succeeding notable economist and airline deregulator Alfred E. Kahn in the Thorne chair). He previously served on the economics faculty at MIT and the University of Pennsylvania.

Shell has been editor of the Journal of Economic Theory, generally regarded as the leading journal in theoretical economics, since its inception in 1968.

== Contributions to economics ==
While Shell has published academic articles on numerous topics in economics, he is primarily known for his contributions in three areas.

Between 1966 and 1973, Shell published three papers on inventive activity, increasing returns to scale, industrial organization, and economic growth. This contribution was important in its day, and later influenced the development of "new growth theory." Among others, Paul Romer cited and heavily built upon Shell's work in his seminal papers on endogenous growth theory.

Shell also made important contributions to the overlapping generations literature (and was perhaps the first to refer to the overlapping generations model by its modern name). The overlapping generations model is now a workhorse in modern macroeconomics and monetary economics.

Karl Shell is also co-inventor (with David Cass) of the concept of sunspot equilibrium (and sunspots). Sunspot equilibrium provides a model for excess market volatility, including bank runs.

== Publications ==
- Karl Shell, "Toward a Theory of Inventive Activity and Capital Accumulation", American Economic Review, Vol. 56(2), May 1966, 62–68.
- Karl Shell, "A Model of Inventive Activity and Capital Accumulation" in Essays on the Theory of Optimal Economic Growth (K. Shell, ed.), Cambridge, Massachusetts: MIT Press, 1967, Chapter IV, 67–85.
- Karl Shell (Editor), Essays on the Theory of Optimal Economic Growth, Cambridge, Massachusetts: MIT Press, 1967, ISBN 9780262190367 (hardcover), 9780262690133(paperback).
- Karl Shell, "Notes on the Economics of Infinity", Journal of Political Economy, Vol. 79(5), September/October 1971, 1002–1011.
- Karl Shell and Giorgio P. Szegö (Editor), Mathematical Methods in Investment and Finance, Amsterdam: North-Holland, 1972. ISBN 0720430674 (North- Holland), 044410395 (American Elsevier).
- Karl Shell and Franklin M. Fisher, The Economic Theory of Price Indices: Two Essays on the Effect of Taste, Quality, and Technological Change, New York: Academic Press, 1972. ISBN 9780122577505.
- Karl Shell, "Inventive Activity, Industrial Organization and Economic Growth" in Models of Economic Growth (J.A. Mirrlees and N. Stern, eds.), London: Macmillan, and New York: Halsted (John Wiley & Sons), 1973, 77–100.
- Karl Shell and David Cass (Editor), The Hamiltonian Approach to Dynamic Economics, New York: Academic Press, 1976. ISBN 012163650X.
- David Cass and Karl Shell, "Do Sunspots Matter?", Journal of Political Economy, Vol. 91(2), April 1983, 193–227.
- Karl Shell, William A. Barnett and John Geweke (Editor), Economic Complexity: Chaos, Sunspots, Bubbles, and Nonlinearity, New York: Cambridge University Press, 1989. ISBN 052135563X.
- Karl Shell and Franklin M. Fisher, Economic Analysis of Production Price Index, New York: Cambridge University Press (Hardcover, ISBN 0521554160, and soft cover, ISBN 0521556236), 1998.
- Karl Shell, "Sunspot Equilibrium", The New Palgrave: A Dictionary of Economics, 2nd Edition (L. Blume and S. Durlauf, eds.), New York: Palgrave Macmillan, 2008.
