= Economic epidemiology =

Economic epidemiology is a field at the intersection of epidemiology and economics. Its premise is to incorporate incentives for healthy behavior and their attendant behavioral responses into an epidemiological context to better understand how diseases are transmitted. This framework should help improve policy responses to epidemic diseases by giving policymakers and health-care providers clear tools for thinking about how certain actions can influence the spread of disease transmission.

The main context through which this field emerged was the idea of prevalence-dependence, or disinhibition, which suggests that individuals change their behavior as the prevalence of a disease changes. However, economic epidemiology also encompasses other ideas, including the role of externalities, global disease commons and how individuals' incentives can influence the outcome and cost of health interventions.

Strategic epidemiology is a branch of economic epidemiology that adopts an explicitly game theoretic approach to analyzing the interplay between individual behavior and population wide disease dynamics.

== Prevalence-dependence ==
The spread of an infectious disease is a population-level phenomenon, but decisions to prevent or treat a disease are typically made by individuals who may change their behavior over the course of an epidemic, especially if their perception of risk changes depending on the available information on the epidemics – their decisions will then have population-level consequences. For example, an individual may choose to have unsafe sex or a doctor may prescribe antibiotics to someone without a confirmed bacterial infection. In both cases, the choice may be rational from the individual's point of view but undesirable from a societal perspective.

Limiting the spread of disease at the population level requires changing individual behavior, which in turn depends on what information individuals have about the level of risk. When risk is low, people will tend to ignore it. However, if the risk of infection is higher, individuals are more likely to take preventive action. Moreover, the more transmissible the pathogen, the greater the incentive is to make personal investments for control.

The converse is also true: if there is a lowered risk of disease, either through vaccination or because of lowered prevalence, individuals may increase their risk-taking behavior. This effect is analogous to the introduction of safety regulations, such as seatbelts in cars, which because they reduce the cost of an accident in terms of expected injury and death, could lead people to drive with less caution and the resulting injuries to nonoccupants and increased nonfatal crashes may offset some of the gains from the use of seatbelts.

Prevalence-dependent behavior introduces a crucial difference with respect to the way individuals respond when the prevalence of a disease increases. If behavior is exogenous or if behavioral responses are assumed to be inelastic with respect to disease prevalence, the per capita risk of infection in the susceptible population increases as prevalence increases. In contrast, when behavior is endogenous and elastic, hosts can act to reduce their risks. If their responses are strong enough, they can reduce the average per capita risk and offset the increases in the risk of transmission associated with higher prevalence.

Alternatively, the waning of perceived risk, either through the diminution of prevalence or the introduction of a vaccine, may lead to increases in risky behavior. For example, models suggested that the introduction of highly active antiretroviral therapy (HAART), which significantly reduced the morbidity and mortality associated with HIV/AIDS, may lead to increases in the incidence of HIV as the perceived risk of HIV/AIDS decreased.

Recent analysis suggests that an individual's likelihood of engaging in unprotected sex is related to their personal analysis of risk, with those who believed that receiving HAART or having an undetectable viral load protects against transmitting HIV or who had reduced concerns about engaging in unsafe sex given the availability of HAART were more likely to engage in unprotected sex regardless of HIV status.

This behavioral response can have important implications for the timing of public interventions, because prevalence and public subsidies may compete to induce protective behavior. In other words, if prevalence induces the same sort of protective behavior as public subsidies, the subsidies become irrelevant because people will choose to protect themselves when prevalence is high, regardless of the subsidy, and subsidies may not be helpful at the times when they are typically applied.

Although STDs are logical targets for examining the role of human behavior in a modeling framework, personal actions are important for other infectious diseases as well. The rapidity with which individuals reduce their contact rate with others during an outbreak of a highly transmissible disease can significantly affect the spread of the disease. Even small reductions in the contact rate can be important, especially for diseases like influenza or severe acute respiratory syndrome (SARS). However, this may also affect policy planning for a biological attack with a disease such as smallpox.

Individual behavioral responses to interventions for non-sexually transmitted diseases are also important. For example, mass spraying to reduce malaria transmission can reduce the irritating effects of biting by nuisance mosquitoes and so lead to reduced personal use of bednets. Economic epidemiology strives to incorporate these types of behavior responses into epidemiological models to enhance a model's utility in evaluating control measures.

== Vaccination ==
Immunization represents a classic case of a social dilemma: a conflict of interest between the private gains of individuals and the collective gains of society, and prevalence-dependent behavior may have significant effects on vaccine policy formation. For instance, it was found in an analysis of the hypothetical introduction of a vaccine that would reduce (though not eliminate) the risk of contracting HIV, that individual levels of risk behavior were a significant barrier to eliminating HIV, as small changes in behavior could actually increase the incidence/prevalence of HIV, even if the vaccine were highly efficacious. These results, as well as others, may have contributed to a decision not to release existing semi-efficacious vaccines.

An individual's self-interest and choice often leads to a vaccination uptake rate less than the social optimum as individuals do not take into account the benefit to others. In addition, prevalence dependent behavior suggests how the introduction of a vaccine may affect the spread of a disease. As the prevalence of a disease increases, people will demand to be vaccinated. As prevalence decreases, however, the incentive, and thus demand, will slacken and allow the susceptible population to increase until the disease can reinvade. As long as a vaccine is not free, either monetarily or through true or even perceived side effects, demand will be insufficient to pay for the vaccine at some point, leaving some people unvaccinated. If the disease is contagious, it could then begin spreading again among non-vaccinated individuals. Thus, it is impossible to eradicate a vaccine-preventable disease through voluntary vaccination if people act in their own self-interest.

== COVID-19 ==
The idea of intertwining epidemiology and economics is relatively new with it first appearing in the early 1990s amidst the HIV/AIDS epidemic. Epidemiologists at the time realized that the disease was spread through one's decisions around sex, and reasoned that it must then be considered an endogenous variable within the Nash-Equilibrium, therefore linking this with economics as the outcomes could then be predicted. Both Economics and Epidemiology however have influence from Utilitarianism in the form of, "doing the most good for the most people" or cost-benefit analysis as both fields of study hope to find net positives in the outcomes of their decisions. However, the SARS-CoV-2 Pandemic and its fallout, has brought extremely relevant and timely data to researchers in this field.

From January 1, 2020, until December 4, 2022, there has been a centrally estimated 1,277,204 excess deaths relating from the COVID-19 pandemic, with a majority of deaths consisting of the disease. Somewhat similar to John Snow discovering the vector for cholera through water pumps, epidemiologists were able to track community spread of COVID-19 through municipal wastewater systems. These excess deaths are often thought of in terms of the human loss, the relationships and families members we no longer possess, but there is also an economic side to these excess mortalities. According to data from the World Bank, in 2021 the average GDP per capita for someone living in the United States was $69,288. Despite the shortcomings of Gross Domestic Product in this scenario it serves as a decent variable to describe the lost economic output due to these excess deaths. Doing the arithmetic of excess deaths to GDP per capita we can see that the United States has lost around $88.5 billion in total output due to excess deaths during the COVID-19 Pandemic. The costs of the pandemic can also be extrapolated out into the cost of vaccine development/deployment, the cost of shutdowns or lack thereof (i.e. lost work/lost spending/low risk areas being closed), the extra health spending for patients that did not need it or could have avoided hospitalization if vaccinated, the fiscal stimulus provided by our government, the lost values to retirement accounts, and the broader effects of inflation.

Individuals have a something to lose as well when it comes to contracting the disease of SARS-CoV-2. For many hourly workers, this sick time off results in lost income and many salaried workers are able to do some work from a home office. Both of these situations can have positive and negative outcomes; whether it's getting additional assistance from the enhanced unemployment benefits for the greater part of 2021, or working from home with poor internet connectivity or no dedicated workspace. These headaches for many potentially contributed to the difference in reported incidence versus estimated-actual incidence rates of COVID-19 within a population. A 2020 cross-sectional study published in the JAMA Internal Medicine Journal performed blood testing on a convenience sample in 10 geographic sites across the United States and found that based on seroprevalence there were 10 times more cases than was being reported.
