= María Soledad Martínez Pería =

Economist

María Soledad Martínez Pería is an economist who, as of 2020, is Chief of the Macro-Financial Division of the Research Department of the International Monetary Fund. She obtained her PhD at the University of California, Berkeley and a Bachelor's degree from Stanford University.

== Career ==
Before joining the IMF, she worked at the Central Bank of Argentina, Brookings Institution, the Board of directors of the Federal Reserve System in Washington as well as the World Bank. At the World Bank, she was Research Manager of the Finance and Private Sector Development Team. Beyond policy work, she has also written extensively in academic journals and has published 35 papers.

== Research ==
The research of Martínez Pería focuses on finance, international economics and the international banking system. She has also worked on financial inclusion. She specializes among other things in the role of bank financing for small and medium enterprises, currency and banking crises and depositor market discipline. Her most cited paper, joint with Michael Bordo, Barry Eichengreen and Daniela Klingebiel, analyzes over 120 years of banking, currency and sovereign debt crises to show that their impact on the economy has not increased. He research has been cited more than 23,000 times. Her research was quoted by Bloomberg and La Nación.
