= Marcel Fafchamps =

Belgian economist

- Born: 1955 (age 69–70)
- Occupation(s): Economist and senior fellow

Marcel Fafchamps (born in 1955) is a Belgian economist and senior fellow at the Freeman Spogli Institute for International Studies (Stanford University). He belongs to the leading economists in the field of rural development.

== Biography ==
A native of Belgium, Marcel Fafchamps earned undergraduate degrees in law and economics from the Catholic University of Louvain in 1978 and 1980, respectively. After his studies and military service, between 1981 and 1985, he worked for the International Labour Organization on rural development, being based in Addis Ababa. Pursuing an interest in research, Fafchamps then earned a Ph.D. in agricultural economics from the University of California at Berkeley with an award-earning thesis in 1989, including a stay at ICRISAT in India. Thereafter, Fafchamps took up a position as assistant professor at Stanford University, first as part of the Food Research Institute and then - from 1996 on - within its Department of Economics. In 1999, Fafchamps then moved to Oxford University as professor of economics, where he held the deputy and co-directorship of Oxford's Centre for the Study of African Economies. Finally, since 2013, he has been back at Stanford University, where he works as senior fellow of the Freeman Spogli Institute for International Studies. Beyond his academic positions, Fafchamps is affiliated with J-PAL, IZA, CEPR, CEGA and the Bureau for Research and Economic Analysis of Development (BREAD). In terms of professional service, Fafchamps serves as editor-in-chief of Economic Development and Cultural Change and had editorial duties at the Journal of African Economies, Economic Journal, Journal of Development Economics, American Journal of Agricultural Economics and the Revue d'Economie du Développement.

== Research ==
Marcel Fafchamps' research focuses on entrepreneurship, factor markets and the efficiency of social networks as well as political economies in Africa and South Asia. In terms of research output, he belongs to the top 1% of economists registered on IDEAS/RePEc. In his research, Fafchamps has frequently co-authored with Simon Quinn (Oxford University) and Bart Minten (IFPRI).

== Bibliography ==
- Fafchamps, M. (2003). Rural Poverty, Risk and Development. Cheltenham, UK: Edward Elgar Publishing.
- Fafchamps, M. (2004). Market Institutions in Sub-Saharan Africa: Theory and Evidence. Cambridge, MA: MIT Press.
