= Eric Edmonds =

Academic background
- Alma mater: Princeton University; University of Chicago

Academic work
- Discipline: child, forced labor, human trafficking youth migration, and human capital.
- Institutions: Dartmouth College, Professor of Economics
- Website: Information at IDEAS / RePEc

Eric Edmonds is a development economist and Professor of Economics at Dartmouth College. His research focuses on child and forced labor, human trafficking, youth migration, and human capital in developing countries with the purpose of improving policy in these areas.

Edmonds is a research associate at the National Bureau of Economic Research, a Senior Fellow at the Bureau for Research and Economic Analysis of Development, a research fellow at the Institute for the Study of Labor, and an Editor of World Bank Economic Review.

== Education ==
Edmonds received his Ph.D. in Economics from Princeton in 1999. He graduated Phi Beta Kappa with a B.A. in Economics from the University of Chicago in 1993.

== Research ==
Edmond's published research has received over 3,000 citations.

His work includes a study published in the Journal of Development Economics, which found a large increase in schooling attendance and a decline in total hours worked after families became eligible for fully anticipatable social pension income in South Africa; a detailed summary of the recent empirical literature on child labor including reasons for and consequences of child labor published in the Handbook of Development Economics; and a study on the effect of trade liberalization on child labor published in the Journal of International Economics, among many others.

His current projects include a study of a debt-bondage system in Nepal, a project aiming to provide life-skills training to middle-school age girls in Rajasthan, and an evaluation of the government of the Philippines principal anti-child labor program.

== Other professional activities ==
Edmonds is on the advisory panels for the U.S. Department of Labor, the International Labor Organization's Understanding Children's Work project, the GoodWeave Foundation, and the National Academy of Science, Engineering, and Medicine.

At Dartmouth, Edmonds created the development economics curriculum and is the faculty lead for the Human Development Initiative at the John Sloan Dickey Center for International Understanding at Dartmouth.

== Books ==
- Child labor and the transition between school and work Bingley : Emerald, 2010.
- Child labor in transition in Vietnam

== Personal ==
Edmonds is married to economics professor Nina Pavcnik.
