= Xavier Vives =

Spanish economist (born 1955)

- Born: 23 January 1955 (age 71); Barcelona, Spain

Academic background
- Education: UC Berkeley (Ph.D., 1983)
- Doctoral advisor: Gérard Debreu

Academic work
- Discipline: Industrial organization Game theory Microeconomics; Banking and finance
- Institutions: IESE Business School
- Website: blog.iese.edu/xvives; Information at IDEAS / RePEc

Xavier Vives (Spanish: [ˈbiβes]; born 1955) is a Spanish economist regarded as one of the main figures in the field of industrial organization and, more broadly, microeconomics. He is currently Chaired Professor of Regulation, Competition and Public Policies, and academic director of the Public-Private Sector Research Center at IESE Business School in Barcelona.

== Biography ==
A native of Barcelona, after obtaining his bachelor's degree from the Autonomous University of Barcelona (UAB), received a doctorate from UC Berkeley under the supervision of Gérard Debreu, and moved to the University of Pennsylvania as an assistant professor. In 1987 moved back to Spain and headed for ten years the Institute for Economic Analysis (CSIC) in the decade of the 1990s. In 2001 he moved to the business school INSEAD in Paris and in 2005 went back to Barcelona with a research professorship at ICREA-UPF (Pompeu Fabra University). He also taught at UAB and held visiting positions at Harvard University, the University of California at Berkeley and New York University. He served as director of the Industrial Organization Program of the Center for Economic Policy Research (CEPR) in 1991–1997. He was editor of the International Journal of Industrial Organization in 1993–1997, editor-in-chief of the European Economic Review (1998–2002), of the Journal of the European Economic Association (2003–2008) and editor of the Journal of Economic Theory in 2013-2020. Currently he is co-editor of the Journal of Economics & Management Strategy. Member of the Identification Committee of the European Research Council in 2014–2019. He has participated extensively in the policy debate in Europe with contributions to a substantial number of reports published by CEPR and CESifo networks as well as columns in Project Syndicate, The Financial Times, The Wall Street Journal and the Spanish press (La Vanguardia, Expansión, El País). From 2011 to 2014 he was Special Advisor to the Vice President of the European Commission and Commissioner for Competition, J. Almunia.

== Research contributions ==
Vives' research concentrates on microeconomics and ranges from industrial organization, information economics, and game theory to banking and finance. His contributions started with seminal research in oligopoly theory and the study of price and quantity competition providing canonical models and results on price formation and competitiveness. The research extended to the interaction between private information and strategic behavior with the early study of information sharing among firms. This research has served as a basis for extensive theoretical and applied developments in industrial organization and international trade among other fields, as well as having implications for competition policy. A path breaking contribution was the pioneer application of lattice-theoretic methods to analyze games of strategic complementarities (or supermodular games), and in general complementarities, in economics. His contribution opened the gates to numerous applications in a wide range of fields including macroeconomics and finance. Further work has studied incomplete information economies and the mechanisms of information aggregation and transmission in markets and learning by traders formalizing the ideas of Hayek. This work provides a bridge between the rational expectations and the herding literatures. and has been applied to study the dynamics of asset prices. Vives has contributed to the study of competition and regulation in banking and of financial stability with research that has policy implications for the financial crisis and European financial integration. More recently, he has examined the implications for competition, innovation and the macroeconomy of the rise of common ownership.

== Books ==
- Oligopoly Pricing: Old Ideas and New Tools (MIT Press, 1999).
- Information and Learning in Markets: the Impact of Market Microstructure (Princeton University Press, 2008).
- Competition and Stability in Banking: the Role of Regulation and Competition Policy (Princeton University Press, 2016).

== Awards and honors ==
Vives is a Fellow of the Econometric Society since 1992, of the European Academy of Sciences and Arts since 2002, of the European Economic Association since 2004, of the Spanish Economic Association since 2010, of the Institute of Catalan Studies since 2011 and of the Academia Europaea since 2012. He has received several research prizes in Spain, among them the Premio Nacional de Investigación Pascual Madoz 2020, the Premio Rey Jaime I de Economía in 2013. In 2009 and 2018 he was awarded a European Research Council Advanced Grant, and in 2015 a Wim Duisenberg Fellowship from the European Central Bank. President of EARIE (European Association for Research in Industrial Economics) for the period 2016–2018 and current Vicepresident of the European Finance Association. Distinguished Fellow of the Luohan Academy since 2020.
