= Nina Pavcnik =

Academic background
- Education: Princeton University; Yale University

Academic work
- Discipline: International trade Economic development Industrial organization
- Institutions: Dartmouth College, Niehaus Family Professor in International Studies
- Website: https://sites.dartmouth.edu/npavcnik/; Information at IDEAS / RePEc

Nina Pavcnik is the Niehaus Family Professor in International Studies for the Economics Department at Dartmouth College.

Her primary research interests lie at the intersection of international trade, development, and industrial organization with specific focus on how agents respond to globalization. Pavcnik's diverse works analyze the effects of globalization on child laborers, households, workers, and firms. Her most recent work studies the effect of large-scale trade policy reforms on economic growth and inequality.

Pavcnik is a research associate at the National Bureau of Economic Research, the Centre for Economic Policy Research, and the Institute for the Study of Labor. She is also a senior fellow at the Bureau for Research and Economic Analysis of Development. She taught Econ 39 and 49 courses in Dartmouth College in 2015.

== Education ==
She graduated from Yale with a B.A. in Economics in 1994, and received her Ph.D. in Economics from Princeton in 1999.

Pavcnik additionally graduated Magna cum laude and was a member of Phi Beta Kappa

== Research ==
Pavnick's research interests are centered around the three following fields: International trade, development, and in austral organization.

Furthermore, she specifically analyzes how globalization is responded to by households, firms, and workers specifically. Similarly, her projects are focused around the investigations of large-scale trade policy reforms and the consequences that may arise in result. Pavcnik's published research has received over 8,000 citations.

Her most cited works include a study of liberalized trade on plant productivity in Chile, published in The Review of Economic Studies; the distributional effects of globalization in developing countries, published in the Journal of Economic Literature (joint with Pinelopi Koujianou Goldberg); and an investigation of the relationship between trade costs, imports of intermediate inputs, and domestic firm product scope using in India, published in The Quarterly Journal of Economics (also joint with Pinelopi Goldberg).

== Professional activities ==
Pavcnik is an editor of the World Bank Economic Review, a co-editor of the Journal of International Economics, and a member of both the World Bank Research Committee and American Economic Association.

At Dartmouth, Pavcnik is on the King Scholar steering committee and the International Studies Minor steering committee. She has also been on the committee on advisory to the president and was chair of the faculty committee on Graduate Fellowships.

== Personal ==
Pavcnik is married to economics professor Eric Edmonds. She is a citizen of Slovenia and the United States.
