= Luxembourg Institute of Socio-Economic Research =

Luxembourgish research institute

Luxembourg Institute of Socio-Economic Research (LISER)
- Established: 1978
- President: Véronique Hoffeld
- CEO: Aline Muller
- Administrative staff: 180
- Location: Esch-sur-Alzette, Luxembourg; 49.503259°N 5.948442°E
- Website: http://www.liser.lu/

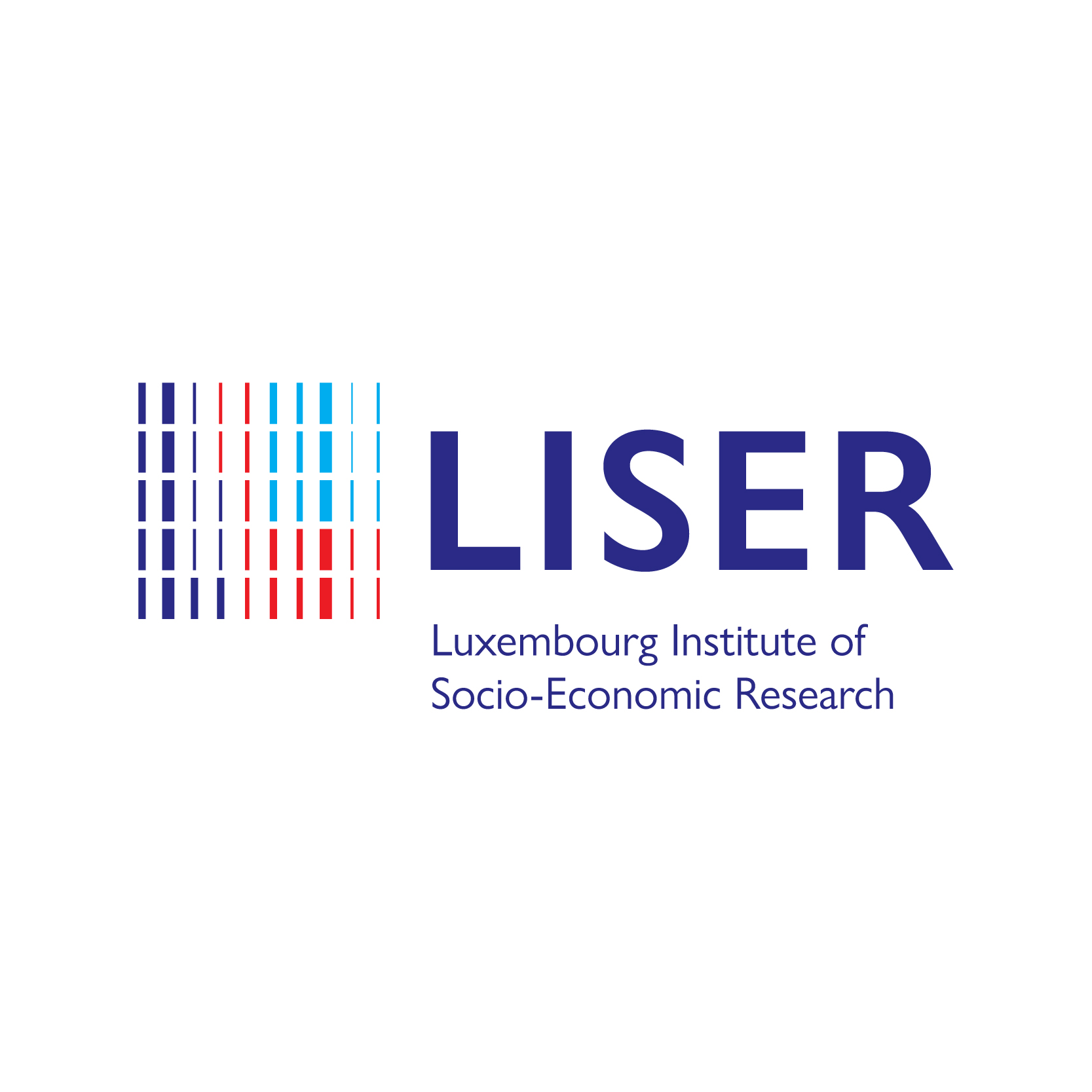
LISER Logo

The Luxembourg Institute of Socio-Economic Research (LISER) is a research center located in Esch-sur-Alzette, Luxembourg.

LISER is a Luxembourgish public research institute under the jurisdiction of the Ministry of Higher Education and Research. Its research focus is in the field of social and economic policy, including the spatial dimension. This includes topics like poverty, inequality, education, social inclusion, employment, unemployment, health, housing, mobility, and regional convergence. The aim is to improve the understanding of causal relationships and to provide sound evidence for the impact of institutional settings and policy options on outcomes. Based on empirical evidence, the institute aims at providing well-grounded and clear-cut answers to policy relevant questions. The results are published in form of research reports, monographs and scientific articles.

LISER has been integrated into a unified legal framework for the Luxembourgish research institutes based on the law of 3 December 2014. It has an annual budget of approximately 18,5 million euro, of which 60% is allocated by the government, and 40% are coming from project related funding resources. Governmental funding is based on a multi-annual performance contract.

== Research ==
Luxembourg and the greater region provide a laboratory for investigating social policy issues that are of key importance for the process of European integration. Substantial institutional differentials within a relatively small distance and their impact on cross-border activities like firm location, household mobility, monetary flows, and the like are generating an abundance of research topics, which are of relevance for a better understanding of the mechanisms of economic and social convergence or divergence.

LISER contributes to the advancement of scientific knowledge in social and economic matters across the activities of its three research departments "Living Conditions", "Labour Market" and "Urban Development and Mobility". In parallel, the institute aligns itself with national and European priorities and fosters interdisciplinarity by focusing its research work on three priority research programs: "Crossing Borders", "Health and Health Systems" and "Digital Transformation".

LISER hosts two complementary infrastructures, key drivers of its research development and excellence.

The Data Centre, which consists of two pillars: the data collection capability (direct and indirect data collection), and the data archiving and data management capability. The Behavioural and Experimental Economics dedicated to investigating human decision-making by means of experiments is performed in controlled environments. Its experimental approach contributes to improving the understanding of human behaviour in a large variety of socioeconomic contexts.

LISER is a socio-economic research institute specialising in the analysis of societal changes. Through its inter- and multidisciplinary research, it aims to contribute to social and economic development at national and international levels.

The institute's staff consists of about 180 employees (including the survey and data center), with more than 50% of the staff being researchers, mainly from the fields of economics, sociology, and geography.

== Labour market ==
The main mission of the department is to produce research that is both excellent and impactful, and more specifically, to analyse the effects of public policies and societal changes on employment and on the workplace.

The department's key themes revolve around:

- The impact of public policies on employment in a context of high cross border mobility and;
- How current socioeconomic challenges (such as digital transformations, diversity and ageing of the workforce) in the workplace impact firms' modes of organisation and performance, employees' skills and behaviour, and labour relations. These issues are timely and relevant for Luxembourg as well as for the European Union.

The department's research is multidisciplinary (economics, statistics, sociology, political science, law) and makes use of various tools (policy evaluation, quantitative, experimental and qualitative methods). Through the Labour Market Observatory, the department uses its research infrastructure and competences to advise policy makers and inform the public about new findings in these fields.

== Living conditions ==
The mission of the department is to produce scientifically high-level and socially relevant research on 'Public Policies, Welfare and Socio-economic Inequalities'.

The department's objective is to contribute via analysis of policy-relevant questions to a better understanding of the drivers of inequality, poverty and social cohesion, both in the short and long term, and of the role, efficiency and sustainability of social policies and the welfare state.

The department is inter and multidisciplinary in nature and characterised by recognised international, scientific and academic expertise in measurement issues (e.g. inequality, equality of opportunity, social monitoring) and ex-ante (microsimulation) and ex-post policy evaluation. More specifically, the department studies the multiple dimensions of individuals' and families' lives which are at the heart of both the causes and consequences of inequality, from early childhood to old age, through education, fertility and family formation, from employment to retirement. Qualitative, typically survey-based research, examines household income, wealth, inequality, poverty, and social inclusion from a variety of perspectives. The impact evaluation of socio-fiscal, family, educational, health, pension and wider social policy on living conditions is an integral part of the department research agenda.

The department contributes also to the multi and inter-disciplinary research programmes of the Institute:

- The LC contribution to the "Health & health systems" interdisciplinary research programme is currently centred on the impact of ageing on the health status of the population and its subsequent economic effect, as well as on the analysis of health inequalities.
- The LC contribution to the "Digital transformation" interdisciplinary research programme covers questions related to the future of social protection (e.g. basic income) or introduction of new methodologies in education (e.g. digital learning platform).
- The LC contribution to the "Migration and Crossing borders " interdisciplinary research programme covers topics such as equality of opportunity and social mobility. The consequences of an increasing number of migrants and cross-border workers on the welfare state, social cohesion, preferences for redistribution and a multilingual educational system are investigated.

== Urban development and mobility ==
The department's objective is to play a prominent role in academic and societal interdisciplinary and intersectoral research, internationally and nationally. The aim is to provide an understanding of urban life and the functioning of urban areas, the implications for the sustainability of cities as well as the quality of life of their inhabitants and visitors, and in identifying effective pathways at the individual and urban level to stimulate urban vitality and liveability.

Major thematic issues on the research agenda are housing, financial centres development, spatial development, cross-border metropolitan integration, local and cross-border mobilities, public health, and smart cities. The two observatories, one on housing and another one on spatial development, including expertise in GIS, form an important basis for research.

The UDM Department contributes also to the three inter-disciplinary research programmes:

- Cross-border issues are central to many studies of the department. Analysing cross-border flows and the relationships with political, social, cultural, economic and institutional factors fosters multiple collaborations with the cross-border interdisciplinary programme.
- UDM has developed strong competences in research on the health implications of mobility and exposures to urban environments and in health interventions, which will be further extended to contribute optimally to the Health & Health Systems interdisciplinary programme.
- In a digitalised society, internet and smartphones offer opportunities to participate in e-activities in a manner less constrained by time and place. In addition, the implementation of automotive vehicles could change daily mobility. The social and spatio-temporal implications of a digitalised society will be an axe of research for the Digital Transformation interdisciplinary programme.

== Crossing borders ==
With the free movement of individuals within the EU, political instability and global inequality, more and more people have been crossing borders in recent decades, either as refugees, regular migrants or as daily transnational commuters. These cross-border movements generate important challenges for EU countries, and has particularly strong implications for its labour market, public finances, social cohesion and regional governance around border areas. In this context, it is important to have tools to monitor, analyse and improve the understanding of causes and consequences of these flows - a prerequisite for relevant advice to policy-makers.

The cross-departmental research programme on 'Crossing Borders' seeks to coordinate, develop and contribute to the Cross-Border work carried out within and across any of the three departments of LISER.

Specific objectives are: (i) Assess the size and structure of historical and recent cross-border flows, and understand their root drivers. (ii) Use innovative sources of data to study the interplay between different forms of mobility. (iii) Analyse the economic and societal consequences of these flows for all parties concerned. (iv) Build projection tools to anticipate future movements. (v) Develop tools to help policy decision-makers to maximise the gains and/or minimise the cost of current and future movements for European countries in general, and for the Luxembourg society in particular. (vi) Provide stakeholders and the civil society with databases and expert analyses that help them understanding the forces at work and the consequences of policy actions. (vii) Contribute to the training of PhD researchers on these topics.

== Health & health systems ==
One of the seventeen goals of the Sustainable Development Goals (SDGs) adopted by the UN in 2015 is "to enable everyone to live in good health and promote the wellbeing of all people at all ages".

The environmental, social and economic conditions in which individuals live, work and develop their daily activities influence a majority of the population's risk factors and health conditions - often representing "the causes of the causes" of disease. Thus, a situation of poverty tends to limit the opportunities to adopt behaviours favouring good health (e.g. healthy diet, physical activity, etc.), to live in healthy environments (safety, healthiness, pollution), to access the means of self-realization (education, social relationships), and to access quality health and long-term care services.

The cross-departmental Research Programme on 'Health and Health Systems' seeks to coordinate, develop and contribute to the health-related work carried out within and across any of the three departments of LISER. The work focuses on primarily quantitative, social, economic & environmental aspects of health, by harnessing the expertise and infrastructure throughout LISER.

LISER will contribute to this objective by developing high quality, multidisciplinary research on a broad range of topics, including:

- Socio-economic and spatial inequalities in the health of individuals and populations.
- Socio-economic and environmental determinants of health.
- The socio-economic consequences of health.
- The economics of health behaviours.
- The rigorous evaluation - in terms of effectiveness as well as (where feasible) 'value for money' - of policies that may directly or indirectly influence these determinants, and;
- The assessment of health system performance.

== Digital transformation ==
Digital Transformations is a transversal cross-departmental research program that seeks to extend the use of mathematical modelling and optimisation to complex socio-economic systems so as to obtain descriptive and prescriptive models able to define/assess socio-economic policies as well as to predict their impact. Its main goal is to connect data to decisions in such a way to solve these problems effectively, achieve better / smarter decisions, and ultimately impact positively society.

The programme heavily exploits analytics, quantitative modeling and computer science to tackle practical problems arising from different domains ranging from finance to education, passing through health care, transportation, telecommunications, and personalised medicine.

Digital Transformations covers the following broad research areas:

- Discrete and Robust Optimization
- Mathematical Programming
- Combinatorial and Graph-Theoretic Algorithms
- Design and Analysis of Algorithms
- Development of large-scale optimization techniques

== Data centre ==
LISER has traditionally had a predominant position in Luxembourg with respect to the face-to face survey component. Its portfolio includes both administrative surveys for Luxembourgish and EU institutions as well as surveys used for research by internal researchers and external research collaborators.

The data centre collects data for scientific studies and makes it available to researchers, policymakers, and other organizations. Drawing on its expertise in survey methodologies and statistics, the centre assists researchers and decision-makers in developing research projects and policy initiatives

As a research infrastructure for data collection and archiving of social science data, the objectives of the centre are to:

- Support LISER researchers as well as the social sciences research community, both locally and internationally, through its unique data collection capability. By bringing operational and scientific expertise based on state-of-the-art, and innovative methods and technologies, the Data Center contributes to the production of high-quality research and effective solutions to major challenges facing society.
- Offer a referenced and trusted platform with tools and services that enables both data producers and data users to easily share, find and access reusable and interoperable data. This in turn addresses the increasing needs of open science while being compliant with security, integrity and privacy of information at stake.

Ongoing surveys include the Household, Finance and Consumption Survey (HFCS), The Household Finance and Consumption Survey - Cross-Border Workers (HFCS-XB) and the European Union Statistics on Income, SHARE Wave 8 and Living Conditions (EU-SILC 2019).

== Behavioural and experimental economics ==
LISER started investing in behavioural and experimental economics in 2015, with the creation of 'LISER-LAB' which consists of a state-of-the-art laboratory facility with 32 networked computers and a subject pool of about 1000 university students, to run economics experiments.

LISER's Centre for behavioural and experimental economics was established in 2019 with the objective is to:

- Generate first-class academic research that can be of interest not only to academic researchers, but also to national and international policymakers. To pursue this objective, the centre's is establishing long-term partnerships with public- and private-sector players that will allow researchers to co-produce research with non-academic partners and to pursue activities of grant-seeking.
- Broaden the spectrum of experimental methods at LISER by creating a platform to conduct large-scale online experiments, using members of the general population resident in Luxembourg as research participants.
- Maximise international visibility by positioning the Centre and LISER within a rich academic network, comprising international centres of excellence in experimental and behavioural economics.

Researchers' interests span from the study of morality and social norms, and their interaction with the intuitional and cultural environment in which they operate, to the behavioural biases that affect labour market participation and outcomes (particularly in relation to gender issues). The group has a history of publications in several top-class academic journals, including American Journal of Political Science, Econometrica, Economic Journal, European Economic Review, Experimental Economics, Games and Economic Behavior, Journal of Economic Behavior and Organization, Journal of the European Economic Association, Journal of Public Economics, Management Science and Proceedings of the National Academy of Sciences.

== History ==
As of December 3, 2014 the former CEPS/INSTEAD has turned into LISER (Luxembourg Institute of Socio-Economic Research).

Previously as CEPS, the centre was composed of five research units: The Department of Population and Employment, the Department of Economics, the Department of Geography (GEODE) and the Department of International Development (ERDI).

International Master in Social Policy Analysis (IMPALLA). With the political and financial support of the Luxembourg Prime Minister and the Minister of Culture, Higher Education and Research a CEPS/INSTEAD related University Consortium was formed in order to create a Graduate School for Comparative Public Policy Analysis and Data. The University Consortium and to guarantee the academic standards of the programme, CEPS/INSTEAD had made a joint venture agreement with the Department of Sociology of the Katholieke Universiteit Leuven as key partner and offers an International Master in Social Policy Analysis (IMPALLA).

Integrated Research Infrastructure in Social Sciences at CEPS/INSTEAD (IRISS) was a visitor's programme at CEPS/INSTEAD. Its mission was to organise short visits of researchers willing to undertake empirical research in economics and other social sciences using the archive of micro-data available at the centre.

In 1978, Gaston Schaber founded an ASBL (Association without lucrative purposes) to research persistent poverty in industrialized countries within the framework of the First European Community Program to Combat Poverty. The centre was then given by Luxembourg law the status of a public establishment by the Prime Minister in 1989, with scientific, administrative and financial autonomy
