= Philippe Michel (economist) =

French mathematical economist

Philippe Michel (6 October 1937 – 22 July 2004) was a French mathematical economist.

== From mathematics to mathematical economics ==
Philippe Michel earned a PhD in Mathematics from the University of Paris VI in 1972, and became a Professor of Mathematics in 1976 at the University of Paris I. In 1993, he joined the Faculty of Economics at the University of Aix-Marseille II at GREQAM. Philippe Michel first scientific contributions were in the field of mathematics, with a focus on optimal control theory. As the methods developed in this field are important tools used in economics, Philippe Michel progressively entered into this field. A list of his contribution to mathematics is provided in an article by Jean-Paul Penot.

== Contributions to economics ==
Philippe Michel's contribution to economics is both related to macroeconomics and public economics. His reference framework is the growth model, viewed as a succession of different generations. The numerous contributions can be classified according to three main topics. First, Philippe Michel studies the problem of the choice of a social welfare function that allows defining the social optimum. Second, when the social optimum has been characterized, its decentralization can be achieved in various frameworks where different types of frictions or externalities may come from environment, education, money, etc. Finally, applying an economic policy may imply two problems : the problem of the inconsistency of the optimal policy, and the question of the neutrality of transfers, when agents are altruistic.

== Prize Philippe Michel ==
Philippe Michel died on 22 July 2004. Jean-Michel Grandmont published an obituary stressing that his prolific scientific contributions were a reflection of his character: original and deep thinking, intellectual honesty. Through his publications, he still has an important place in economic research. The role he played in advising numerous young researchers over the years has led his friends to honor him through the award of a young researcher prize for the best paper on economic dynamics on the fifth anniversary of his death.

== Books published ==
- Philippe Michel published several books in French.
- In English: A Theory of Economic Growth, Dynamics and Policy in Overlapping Generations (with D. de la Croix), Cambridge University Press, 2002.
