= Suresh de Mel =

Sri Lankan cricketer

Suresh de Mel was a Sri Lankan cricketer who played for Old Cambrians.

De Mel made a single first-class appearance, during the 1991/92 season, against Tamil Union in November 1991. Batting in the tailend, he scored 0 in the first innings in which he batted and finished 0 not out in the second. He took figures of 1–52 in an innings defeat for the team.
