= Convergence clubs =

Convergence clubs, in global economic theory, pertain to levels of international attainment. Groups of countries are classified based on educational levels, income per capita and other measurable factors. For example, countries considered "poor" tend to converge towards one another and create a convergence club at a low level of per-capita wealth. Rich, developed nations such as the United States and those of Western Europe are grouped into a higher-income per-capita convergence level. Barriers such as educational limitations, lack of resources or poor infrastructure prevent poor countries from moving to a higher convergence club. These factors make it nearly impossible for a country in one convergence club to move to another convergence club.

Convergence clubs are useful for examining economic development in a specific country, relative to other countries. These groups help to identify similarities and differences between countries, and assist researchers in making generalized hypotheses.

== See also ==
- International inequality
