= Journal of African Economies =

- Discipline: Economy
- Language: English

Publication details
- History: 1992-present
- Publisher: Oxford University Press (United Kingdom)
- Frequency: Quarterly
- Impact factor: 1.50 (2024)

Standard abbreviations
- ISO 4: J. Afr. Econ.

Indexing
- ISSN: 0963-8024 (print); 1464-3723 (web)
- OCLC no.: 42910154

Links
- Journal homepage; Online access

The Journal of African Economies is published five times a year by Oxford University Press on behalf of the Centre for the Study of African Economies, University of Oxford. The journal publishes economic analyses, focused entirely on Africa. Each issue contains applied research together with a comprehensive book review section and a listing of current working papers from around the world. According to the Journal Citation Report, the journal's impact factor was 1.196 in 2020.
