= Oleg Itskhoki =

Russian-American economist (born 1983)

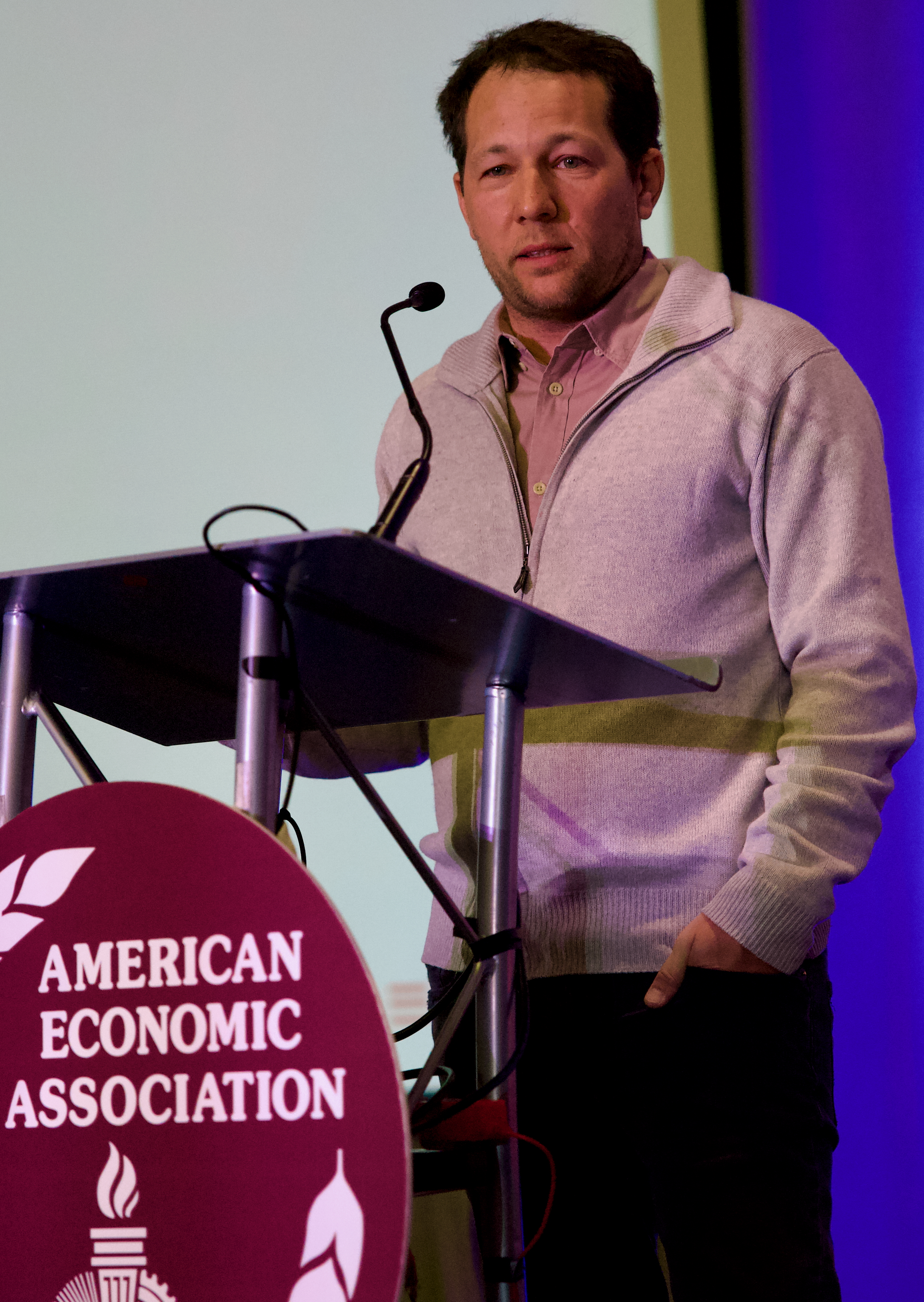
- Itskhoki at ASSA 2026
- Born: January 7, 1983 (age 43); Moscow, Soviet Union

Academic background
- Education: Moscow State University (BA) New Economic School (MA) Harvard University (PhD)
- Doctoral advisor: Elhanan Helpman

Academic work
- Institutions: Harvard University University of California, Los Angeles Princeton University
- Awards: John Bates Clark Medal (2022)

Oleg Itskhoki (born in Moscow on January 7, 1983) is a Russian-American economist specialized on macroeconomics and international economics and (as of 2024) a professor of economics at the Harvard University. He won the John Bates Clark Medal for his "fundamental contributions to both international finance and international trade" in 2022.

== Biography ==
Born in Moscow in 1983, Oleg Itskhoki earned his B.A. in economics from the Moscow State University in 2003, followed by a M.A. in economics from the New Economic School in 2004. He then pursued PhD studies in economics at Harvard University, graduating in 2009 with a dissertation on the relationship between international trade and unemployment, inequality and redistribution under the advisorship of Elhanan Helpman, Gita Gopinath, Aleh Tsyvinski and Pol Antras. After his studies, Itskhoki worked as a professor of economics and international affairs at Princeton University, including as an Alfred P. Sloan Research Fellow in 2015–2017. In 2019, he moved to the University of California, Los Angeles, where he was honoured with the Venu and Ana Kotamraju Endowed Chair in Economics in 2020. Additionally, Itskhoki works an associate editor for the American Economic Review, as a research associate at the National Bureau of Economic Research (NBER), and as a research affiliate at the Centre for Economic Policy Research (CEPR).

== Research ==
Oleg Itskhoki's research interests include the impacts of international trade on labour markets, exchange rate disconnect, and exchange rate pass-through, among else. According to IDEAS/RePEc, Itskhoki ranks among the top 3% of economists in terms of research output.

In a key part of his research, Itskhoki, Elhanan Helpman and Stephen Redding develop a framework wherein more productive firms pay higher wages and exporting increases the wage paid by a firm with a given productivity, resulting in a setting where trade liberalization can either raise or reduce unemployment but always increases wage inequality relative to autarky. Building on this model, Itskhoki, Helpman, Redding and Marc-Andreas Muendler find that firm employment size and trade participation are related to wage dispersion between firms, which drives the component of wage inequality within sectors and occupations, with the resulting distribution of wages and employment in Brazilian linked employer-employee data closely approximated by Helpman, Itskhoki and Redding's 2010 model. Moreover, in earlier work Itskhoki and Helpman have explored how labour market rigidities in a two-country, two-sector model of international trade affects unemployment.

Another part of Itskhoki's research deals international finance and especially with analyses of exchange-rate pass-through, a measure of how much import prices in local currency change in reaction to changes in the price of foreign currency in the local currency (the exchange rate). For instance, Itskhoki and Gita Gopinath find that import prices tend to be more sensitive to exchange rate fluctuations the more often prices adjust, which they attribute to firms being reluctant to frequently adjust prices since variable price mark-ups - which tend to reduce long-run pass-through - would also reduce profits. In another paper co-authored by Itskhoki and Gopinath with Roberto Rigobon, they find that, even conditional on a price change, exchange-rate pass-through depends the choice of the currency in which goods are priced both across countries and within disaggregated sectors, thereby contradicting the assumption that the currency of pricing is exogenous, suggesting that currency choice in a dynamic price setting environment needs to be modelled endogenously. Together with Mary Amiti and Jozef Konings, Itskhoki has also shown that small non-importing firms have nearly complete exchange rate pass-through, whereas large import-intensive exporters have pass-through of ca. 50%, which explains why one may observe both low aggregate exchange rate pass-through among firms and strong variation in pass-through across exporting firms. Finally, in a paper with Dmitry Mukhin, building on the insight that financial market noise - instead of economic fundamentals - may be a key driver of exchange rate dynamics, Itskhoki develops a real business cycle model of exchange rate determination, which - when enriched with features such as home bias in consumption and combined with productivity and monetary shocks - can account for all major exchange rate puzzles (Meese-Rogoff exchange rate forecasting puzzle, Backus-Smith puzzle, purchasing power parity puzzle, uncovered interest rate puzzle) while fitting empirical business cycle behaviour. A similar insight is also used by Itskhoki and Mukhin to explain the Mussa puzzle.
