= Imagocracy =

Propaganda as governance

Imagocracy (from the Spanish imagocracia) is a form of governance where censorship and propaganda—particularly through media manipulation—rather than violent coercion, influence public opinion to maintain power. In an imagocracy, primarily observed in so-called informational autocracies or spin dictatorships, the focus is on propaganda techniques such as spin, disinformation, and maintaining psychological control by instilling fear of the 'Other.'

An informational autocracy does not use violence or direct repression on its political opponents. It also creates its own institutions that mimic democratic institutions. The final characteristic of these regimes is that they have little support with the educated elite, but have wide support among the less-educated masses.

== Etymology ==
The term imagocracy was likely first coined in Spanish (as imagocracia) by Peruvian politician Manuel Dammert in 2001 to describe Alberto Fujimori's style of governance:

A dictatorship that constructs and dominates the images of social life to perpetuate the hidden power of a corrupt mafia that keeps sterilized the vacuous institutions of representative democracy ... its source of power lies in the domination of the image, whose representation alienates individuals. This social relation, converted into everyday routine and instituted as the vortex of social reproduction is the foundation of its existence as a dictatorship and the engine that calls for its perpetuation.

The informational autocracy concept was proposed by Russian economist Sergey Guriyev and British-American political scientist Daniel Treisman in a 2020 paper (later as spin dictatorship in their 2022 book of the same name):

Dictators survive not by means of force or ideology but because they convince the public—rightly or wrongly—that they are competent. Citizens do not observe the leader's type but infer it from signals in their living standards, state propaganda, and messages sent by an informed elite via independent media. If citizens conclude that the leader is incompetent, they overthrow him. The dictator can invest in making convincing state propaganda, censoring independent media, co-opting the elite, or equipping police to repress attempted uprisings—but he must finance such spending at the expense of the public's consumption.

== Regimes ==
=== Alberto Fujimori's Peru ===
Alberto Fujimori's Peru is considered the world's first imagocratic dictatorship. Its reliance on the yellow press, rather than open repression, to destroy political opposition—contrary to the historical norm in Latin America—has been particularly noted.

==== Media manipulation - Fujimedia ====
"By controlling the media, one controlled the ratings. And by controlling the ratings, one controlled politics."

Alberto Fujimori's campaign against the Shining Path, a Maoist guerrilla group, was marked by harsh measures, including the stigmatization of the Andean population as "leftist terrorists". This strategy exploited historical biases against small ethnic minorities, particularly those associated with terrorism, allowing Fujimori to leverage public fear to his political advantage. His administration faced severe criticism from human rights organizations, which accused the government of being complicit in the murder of journalists by right-wing paramilitary groups. In response, Fujimori labeled these activists as the "legal arm" of terrorism and issued threats of life imprisonment for those who criticized the military.

Fujimori also cultivated an image as a technocratic leader, preferring the title of "manager" over that of politician, to project a blend of visionary leadership and administrative efficiency. Alongside his security chief, Vladimiro Montesinos—often considered the true power behind the throne—Fujimori used media manipulation as a key tool in his governance. Instead of relying solely on slander against political rivals, Fujimori sought to co-opt media owners. By the early 1990s, six of Peru's seven major television stations were privately owned, and Montesinos bribed these media moguls to ensure self-censorship and favorable coverage of the government.

By the end of the decade, Montesinos was paying over $3 million per month to these television stations for their cooperation. Despite their official independence, these outlets maintained only a superficial appearance of objectivity. The regime further benefited from the creative talents of the private sector's producers and writers, who indirectly supported the government's messaging. Fujimori extended his control beyond news, effectively weaponizing entertainment to shape public perception and consolidate his power.

==== Censorship and coercion ====
The strategies employed by spin dictators like Fujimori marked a departure from the traditional methods of authoritarian control characterized by overt censorship and the use of fear. Historically, dictators sought to wield absolute power, but Fujimori's approach was deliberately nuanced and covert. In the context of a globalized economy, maintaining an absolute monopoly on information was increasingly seen as counterproductive, as it could hinder progress and draw unwanted attention. Fujimori recognized that a total information monopoly was not only unnecessary but also undesirable, as it could provoke public curiosity and inadvertently spread the very information the regime sought to suppress—a phenomenon later known as the Streisand effect.

Fujimori's model of control was characterized by its subtlety. Rather than overtly censoring dissenting views, the regime aimed to subtly skew news coverage, ensuring that viewers remained unaware of the manipulation. This approach was designed to avoid the impression that the government had anything to hide, thereby preventing the public from seeking out alternative sources of information.

When coercion was necessary, Fujimori and his chief of intelligence, Montesinos, preferred to keep it out of sight, relying on regulatory pressures or business deals to achieve their ends. A notable example occurred in 1997 when Baruch Ivcher, a television magnate, turned against the government. Ivcher's Channel 2 broadcast damaging exposés of Montesinos and the National Intelligence Service (SIN). In response, Montesinos initially attempted to bribe Ivcher, offering him $19 million to relinquish control of the station's news programming. When Ivcher refused, Montesinos resorted to a legal maneuver, stripping Ivcher, a naturalized Peruvian citizen of Israeli origin, of his citizenship. Since only Peruvian citizens could own a television station, a compliant judge was then able to reassign Ivcher's shares to more loyal supporters of the regime.

Unlike traditional autocrats who might have resorted to violence, Montesinos recognized the potential backlash such actions could provoke. When one of his aides suggested making death threats against Ivcher, Montesinos dismissed the idea, citing the negative consequences faced by Chilean dictator Augusto Pinochet. Despite Montesinos' aversion to overt violence in this instance, he was not above using bloodshed when it served his purposes, as evidenced by his earlier deployment of death squads against peasants during the conflict with the Shining Path. However, the actions taken against Ivcher proved costly for the regime. In Lima, protests erupted in response to Ivcher's mistreatment, and the Catholic Church condemned the revocation of his citizenship as "illegal and dangerous". The U.S. Congress and the Inter-American Court of Human Rights also denounced the measure, a fact that underscored the international repercussions of the regime's actions.

==== Fall ====
For an extended period, these strategies proved effective in sustaining Alberto Fujimori's regime in Peru. However, the entire apparatus unraveled after Canal N, a small cable television channel that Montesinos had overlooked, aired a footage later known as Vladi-videos. This piece of footage captured Montesinos himself bribing an opposition congressman with stacks of cash. Once this evidence was broadcast, the other television channels—despite their prior agreements with Montesinos—followed suit, leading to the collapse of the regime. Allowing such footage to leak constituted a severe miscalculation—what could be termed catastrophic negligence for a regime reliant on media manipulation.

The downfall of Fujimori was not merely due to the independence of Canal N. Neglecting a minor, low-circulation channel was in line with the tactics of a spin dictatorship. Canal N, launched in July 1999, had a limited audience due to its high subscription fee, reaching only tens of thousands of viewers. One factor was the regime's already weakened state. The economy, under Fujimori's liberal policies, was failing to generate employment for his core supporters, and economic growth had turned negative in 1998–99. Fujimori's approval ratings had plummeted to 44 percent. Additionally, he faced mounting pressure from the United States and some domestic allies to dismiss Montesinos. The release of the video was the final blow. Daniel Borobio, the regime's public relations adviser, suggested that had the scandal been delayed, it might have dissipated through a prolonged and inconclusive investigation. However, Fujimori, losing his composure, appeared on television to announce his early resignation. Shortly afterward, he fled to Japan, from where he formally resigned the presidency via fax.
