= Sergei Guriev =

Russian economist (born 1971)

- Сергей Гуриев
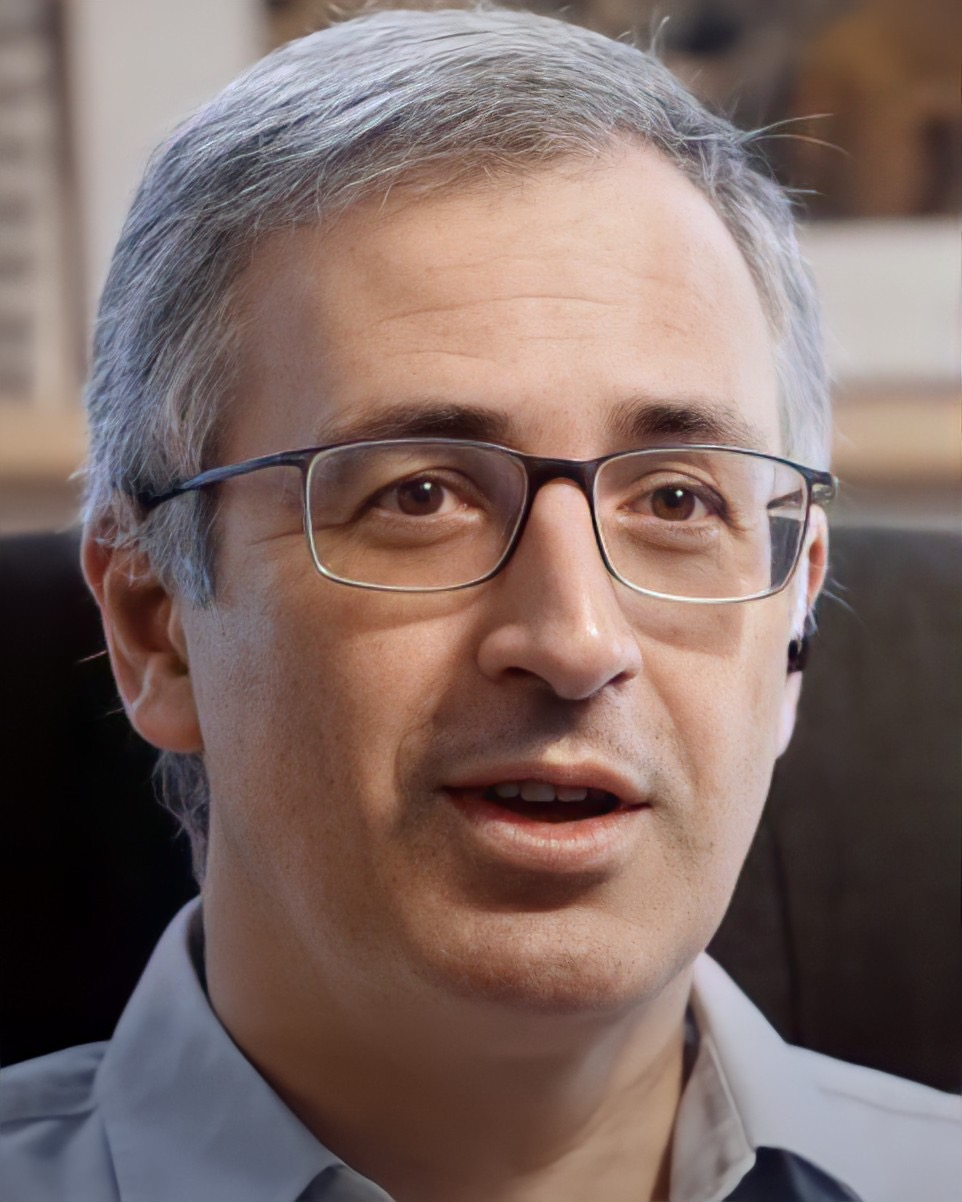
- Guriev in 2021
- Born: 21 October 1971 (age 54); Ordzhonikidze, North Ossetian ASSR, Russian SFSR, Soviet Union
- Citizenship: Soviet Union (until 1991); Russia (since 1991)
- Education: Moscow Institute of Physics and Technology
- Known for: Chief Economist of the European Bank for Reconstruction and Development (2015–2019) and Dean and Professor of Economics at London Business School (2024-present)
- Scientific career
- Fields: Economics
- Workplaces: Rector of New Economic School (2004–2013); President of the Center for Economic and Financial Research (2005–2013); Professor of economics at Sciences Po (2013–2024); Provost of Sciences Po (2022–2024); Dean and Professor of Economics at London Business School (2024–present)
- Website: Personal website

Sergei Maratovich Guriev (Russian: Серге́й Мара́тович Гури́ев, Iron Ossetic: Гуыриаты Мараты фырт Сергей, romanized: Gwyriaty Maraty fyrt Sergej; born 21 October 1971) is a Russian economist, and the dean and a professor of economics at the London Business School since August 2024.

Previously at Sciences Po, he was provost from 2022 to 2024 and a professor of economics from 2013 to 2024. He was chief economist of the European Bank for Reconstruction and Development from 2016 to 2019. He was a Morgan Stanley professor of economics and a rector at Moscow's New Economic School (NES) from 2004 to 2013, before he resigned and moved to France following a search of his office and the seizure of his past five years of emails by the Russian government.

He is a member of The Trilateral Commission.

== Biography ==
Sergei Guriev was born to an ethnic Ossetian family, on 21 October 1971 in Vladikavkaz, North Ossetia. He received his straight As high school diploma in 1988 from Kyiv Physics Mathematics High School #145. In 1993 he graduated summa cum laude from Moscow Institute of Physics and Technology with master's degrees in economics and computer science, and in 1994 received his PhD in applied mathematics from the Russian Academy of Sciences. In 1997–98, he visited the Department of Economics at MIT on a post-doctoral fellowship. In 2002, he received a degree of Doctor of Science in economics (habilitation degree) from the Russian Academy of Sciences. In 2003–2004, he was a visiting assistant professor at the Department of Economics at Princeton University. Guriev was an informal advisor and speechwriter to Russian president Dmitry Medvedev, in office from May 2008 to May 2012, during which time he also sat on government advisory boards and on the boards of state enterprises. He has also supported and advised Russian opposition leader Alexei Navalny, in particular, being one of the founding donors of his Anti-Corruption Foundation in 2012, working for his 2013 Moscow Mayor electoral campaign, and was an informal advisor afterwards.

He joined NES in 1998, become NES’ first tenure-track faculty member in 1999, and become a tenured professor and Rector in 2004. He was also teaching graduate courses in economics of development, microeconomic theory and contract theory.

=== Departure from Russia ===
Guriev left Russia on 30 April 2013 after a “frightening and humiliating interrogation” as government investigators searched his office and secured 5 years of his emails due to his activities in a panel of legal and economical experts who critically assessed Russian position in the second Yukos case. In 2015 Vladimir Putin denied that Guriev's departure “could have been related to any activities of the authorities”.

In November 2023, the official Russian news agencies TASS and RIA reported that Russia's interior ministry had placed him on a wanted list with Sergey Aleksashenko, another economist in exile, on unspecified charges.

== Awards ==
In 2001, Guriev was announced the Best Academic Manager in Social Sciences by the Science Support Foundation. In 2000 and 2005, he was awarded a gold medal for Best Research in Development Economics by the Global Development Network. In 2006, he was selected a Young Global Leader by the World Economic Forum. He is a Senior Member of the Institut Universitaire de France, Ordinary Member of the Academia Europaea, and an Honorary Foreign Member of the American Economic Association.

== Professional activities ==
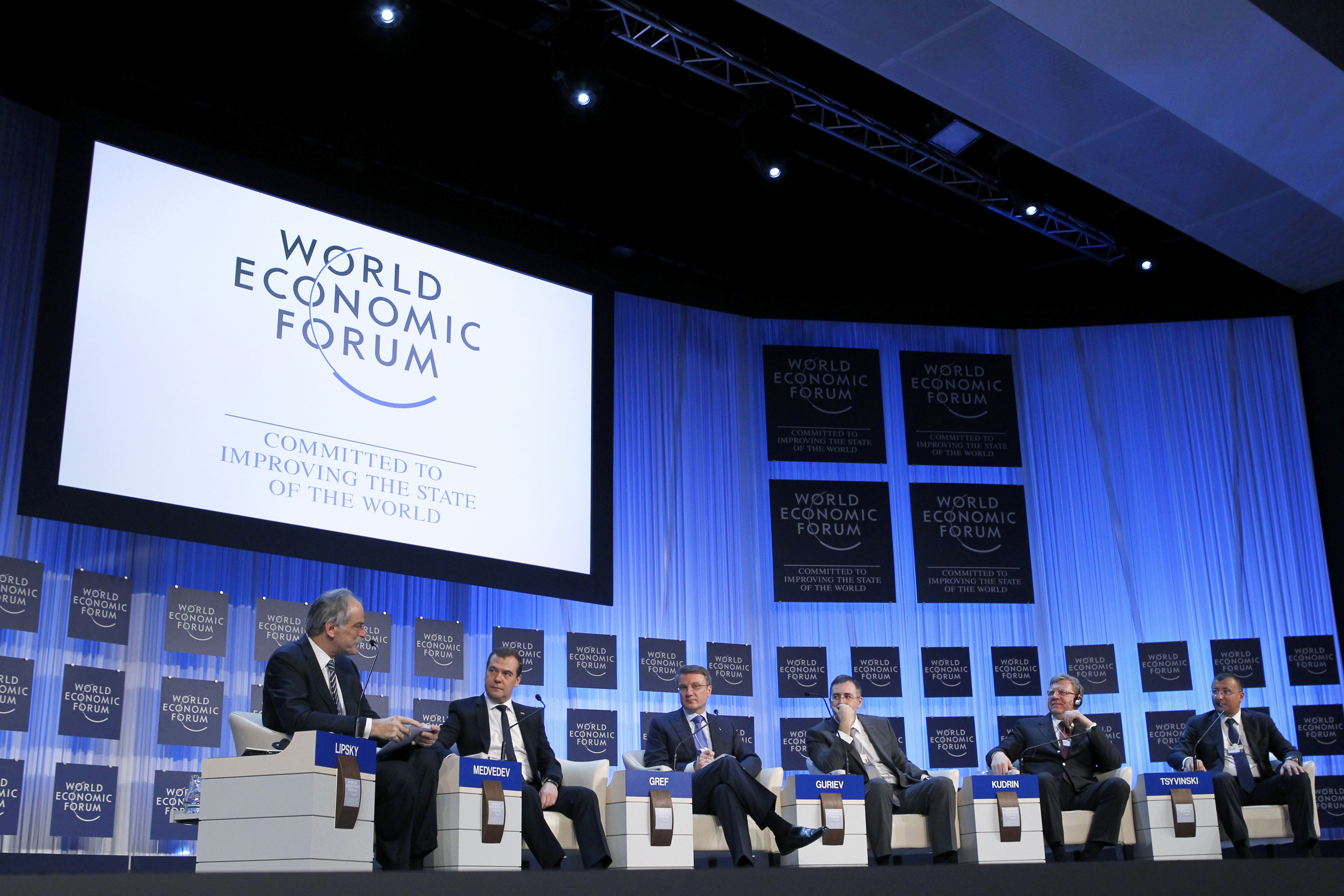
Guriev, Premier Medvedev, CEO of Sberbank Gref, and ex-finance minister Kudrin at World Economic Forum in Davos on 23 January 2013

Guriev's primary interests are in contract theory, corporate governance, labor mobility, political economics, economics of development and transition. His work has been published in international refereed journals, including the American Economic Review, The Review of Economic Studies, The Quarterly Journal of Economics, the Journal of the European Economic Association, the Journal of Economic Perspectives, the Economic Journal and the American Political Science Review. He ran a monthly column in Forbes Russia (in 2006–2013) and a biweekly column for the leading Russian business daily Vedomosti (in 2003–2013). He has also contributed numerous columns in the New York Times, the Financial Times, the Washington Post, Project Syndicate, and the Moscow Times, among others.

In 2008–2012 he was a member of President of Russia's Council on Science, Education and Technology, in 2010-12 he was a member of the president of Russia's Commission on the National Projects, and in 2012–2013 he was a member of Government of Russia's Commission on Open Government (2012–2013).

Guriev is a research fellow at the Centre for Economic Policy Research (CEPR), London. He was also a co-editor of the Economics of Transition, and a panel member of the Economic Policy journal. He was a member of the Scientific Council of Bruegel think tank, member of the international advisory council of the Peterson Institute for International Council, member of the international advisory board of the Blavatnik School of Governance at Oxford University, and a member of the strategic council of the School of Public Affairs at Sciences Po, Paris. He is currently a member of the executive committee of the International Economic Association, a global member of the Trilateral Commission, and a member of AXA Research Fund's scientific council.

In 2016–2017, he was the president of the Society for Institutional and Organizational Economics (formerly the International Society for the New Institutional Economics).

== Board memberships ==
Guriev has been a board member at Sberbank (2008–2014), Agency for Home Mortgage Lending (2008–2013), Russian Agricultural Bank (2008–2009), Alfa Strakhovanie Insurance Company (2009–2013), Russian Venture Company (2009–2013, board chair in 2012–2013), E.ON Russia (2013–2014), and of the Dynasty Foundation (2007–2015, board chair in 2011–2013).

In 2009 and 2010 he received the Independent Director of the Year prize from Russia's National Association of Independent Directors. In 2010, he received a Certificate in Company Directorship from the UK Institute of Directors and was voted the Best Independent Director by the Association of Managers of Russia and the Russian Institute of Directors.

From 2016 until 2019, Guriev was the chief economist and a member of the executive committee at the European Bank for Reconstruction and Development.

== Selected publications ==
- Guriev, Sergei, and Daniel Treisman (2022). “Spin Dictators: The Changing Face of Tyranny in the 21st Century”. Princeton University Press.
- Fisman, Raymond J., Sergei Guriev, Carolin Ioramashvili, and Alexander Plekhanov (2024). "Corruption and Firm Growth: Evidence from around the World". Economic Journal 134 (660): 1494–1516.
- Cheremukhin, Anton, Mikhail Golosov, Sergei Guriev, and Aleh Tsyvinski (2024). “The Political Development Cycle: The Right and the Left in People’s Republic of China from 1953”. American Economic Review, 114(4): 1107-39.
- Zhuravskaya, Ekaterina, Sergei Guriev, Andrei Markevich (2024). "New Russian Economic History". Journal of Economic Literature 62(1):47-114.
- Emeric Henry, Ekaterina Zhuravskaya, Sergei Guriev (2022). “Checking and Sharing Alt-Facts”. American Economic Journal: Economic Policy 14 (3), 55-86.
- Sergei Guriev and Elias Papaioannou(2022). "The Political Economy of Populism". Journal of Economic Literature 60(3): 753-832.
- Philippe Aghion, Sergei Guriev, and Kangchul Jo (2021). “Chaebols and firm dynamics in Korea". Economic Policy 36(108): 593-626.
- Sergei Guriev, Nikita Melnikov, Ekaterina Zhuravskaya (2021). “ 3G Internet and Confidence in Government”. Quarterly Journal of Economics 136(4): 2533-2613.
- Adsera, Alicia, Dalla Pozza, Francesca, Guriev, Sergei, Kleine-Rueschkamp, Lukas, and Nikolova, Elena (2021). “Transition from plan to market, height and well-being.” Economic Policy 36(105): 77-120.
- Sergei Guriev and Daniel Treisman (2020). “The popularity of authoritarian leaders: A cross-national investigation". World Politics 72(4): 601-638.
- Ananyev, Maxim, and Sergei Guriev (2019). “The effect of income on trust: the evidence from 2009 crisis in Russia”. Economic Journal 129(619): 1082-1118.
- Guriev, Sergei, and Daniel Treisman (2019). “Informational Autocrats". Journal of Economic Perspectives 33(4): 100-127.
- Guriev, Sergei (2019). "Gorbachev vs. Deng: A Review of Chris Miller’s The Struggle to Save the Soviet Economy". Journal of Economic Literature 57(1), pp. 120-46.
- Guriev, Sergei (2018). “Economic Drivers of Populism". American Economic Review: Papers and Proceedings 108, pp. 200-203.
- Algan, Yann, Sergei Guriev, Elias Papaioannou, and Evgenia Passari (2017). "The European Trust Crisis and the Rise of Populism". Brookings Papers on Economic Activity 48(2), pp. 309-400.
- Cheremukhin, Anton, Mikhail Golosov, Sergei Guriev, and Aleh Tsyvinski (2017). “The Industrialization and Economic Development of Russia through the Lens of a Neoclassical Growth Model". Review of Economic Studies 84(2): 613-649.
- Guriev, Sergei, and Nikita Melnikov (2016). “War, Inflation, and Social Capital.” American Economic Review: Papers and Proceedings, 106(5): 230-235.
- Guriev, Sergei, and Mikhail Klimenko (2015). “Duration and Term Structure of Trade Agreements.” Economic Journal, 125(589): 1818-1849.
- Egorov, Georgy, Sergei Guriev, and Konstantin Sonin (2009). “Why Resource-Poor Dictators Allow Freer Media: A Theory and Evidence from Panel Data”. American Political Science Review, 103(4), 645-668.
- Guriev, Sergei, and Ekaterina Zhuravskaya (2009). “(Un)Happiness in Transition". Journal of Economic Perspectives, 23(2), 143-68.
- Bhattacharya, Sudipto, and Sergei Guriev (2006). “Knowledge disclosure, patents and the optimal organization of R&D”. Journal of European Economic Association, 4(6), 1112-1147.
- Friebel, Guido, and Sergei Guriev (2006). “Smuggling humans: A theory of debt-financed migration". Journal of European Economic Association, 4(6), 1085-1111.
- Guriev, Sergei, and Dmitriy Kvasov (2005). “Contracting on time". American Economic Review, 5(5), 1369-1385.
- Friebel, Guido, and Sergei Guriev (2005). "Should I stay or can I go: attachment of workers through in-kind payments". World Bank Economic Review, 19(2), 175-202.
- Guriev, Sergei, and Andrei Rachinsky (2005). “The Role of Oligarchs in Russian Capitalism”. Journal of Economic Perspectives, Winter 2005, 131-150.
