= Birgit Grodal =

Danish economist

- Born: 24 June 1943
- Died: 4 May 2004 (aged 60)

Academic background
- Influences: Werner Fenchel

Birgit Grodal (24 June 1943 - 4 May 2004), was an economics professor at the University of Copenhagen from 1968 until her death in 2004.

== Early life ==
Birgit Grodal was born on 24 June 1943 in Copenhagen, Denmark. She grew up in Frederiksberg. She was the middle child having both a younger and an older brother. Grodal was interested in mathematics from a young age and used to fill the pages of her psalm book with equations. She was married to Torben Grodal.

== Education ==
Grodal gained her degree (1962) and her masters (1968) in mathematics and physics from the University of Copenhagen. Also at the University of Copenhagen she earned her Ph.D. in mathematics under Werner Fenchel, her dissertation, A critical overview of the present theory on atomless economies, won a gold medal, something which was used to support young scholars in the old Danish academic system.

== Research ==
Birgit Grodal worked on micro-economic theory, mathematical economics, and general equilibrium theory.

== Career ==
Birgit Grodal was elected president of the European Economic Association, but died before she was scheduled to attain her presidency. In 2010 the European Economic Association Council agreed unanimously to institute a prize in her honor to a European-based female economist who has made a significant contribution to the Economics profession. She was also a member of the Econometric Society starting in 1981 and served on the executive committee between 1997 and 2000.

== Publications ==
Her major works include A Second Remark on the Core of an Atomless Economy" published in Econometrica in 1972, and Existence of Approximate Cores with Incomplete Preferences published in Econometrica in 1976.

== The Birgit Grodal Award ==
The Birgit Grodal Award is bestowed bi-annually (even years) in her memory, the winner receives €10,000. Danmarks Nationalbank agreed to sponsor the first three awards.

The recipients of the Birgit Grodal Award are:

- 2012: Hélène Rey
- 2014: Rachel Griffith
- 2016: Lucrezia Reichlin
- 2018: Ekaterina Zhuravskaya
- 2020: Eliana La Ferrara
- 2022: Silvana Tenreyro
- 2024: Michèle Tertilt
