= List of research centers and laboratories at the University of California, Berkeley =

The University of California, Berkeley, contains many research centers and laboratories.

== Berkeley APEC Study Center ==
The Berkeley APEC Study Center (BASC) is an APEC Study Center. It was established in 1996 in response to the Asia-Pacific Economic Cooperation (APEC) Leaders Education Initiative introduced by President Bill Clinton and endorsed by the leaders of the other APEC member nations at their historic meetings on Blake Island, Seattle in November 1993. BASC conducts multidisciplinary research activities that analyze political, economic and business trends in the Asia-Pacific with a special emphasis on the APEC forum. The institute also provides academic supports for the dissemination of APEC's mission and conducts "international conferences, colloquia, and outreach to the business and policy community". BASC is currently engaged in researching domestic determinants of East Asian regionalism and the effects of the rise of Russia, India and China on the U.S.-EU transatlantic alliance. Previous areas of research include Northeast Asian and Asian institutional architecture, bilateral trade agreements in the Asia-Pacific, EU transregionalism strategies, and strategies for international trade and politics in Latin America.

== Berkeley Roundtable on the International Economy (BRIE) ==
BRIE conducts a variety of research in the area of political economy, with a particular focus on high-tech trade. BRIE projects have shown, for example, that national comparative advantage is created not revealed, that high-tech trade patterns are massively influenced by domestic policies, and that what a nation produces and trades—the composition of domestic production—matters for its growth and security. BRIE is co-directed by Professors John Zysman and Steven S. Cohen, though a number of other faculty members, visiting scholars, and graduate students are also affiliated with the institute.

== Renewable and Appropriate Energy Laboratory ==
The Renewable and Appropriate Energy Laboratory (RAEL) is a research laboratory based at the University of California, Berkeley led by Dan Kammen. It focuses on designing, testing, and disseminating renewable and appropriate energy systems.

== Institute of International Studies (IIS) ==
The Institute of International Studies was established in 1955, and its current research focuses on peace and global security in the 21st century; environment, demography, and sustainability; globalization, development, and human rights; and technological change and the transformation of the global economy. IIS hosts several major research programs, provides support to Berkeley faculty, awards fellowships to Berkeley graduate students, and offers research training to undergraduates.

== Institute of Transportation Studies ==
Institute of Transportation Studies has been recognized as one of the world's leading centers for transportation research. They also conduct industry specific education programs.

== Regional and Area Studies Centers ==
UC Berkeley hosts a number of research units that are focused on specific areas of the world. These centers host visiting scholars, organize events, provide support to Berkeley faculty and students, and perform a wide array of other functions.

A number of the institutions focus on Asia; the Institute of East Asian Studies often collaborates with

- the Center for Japanese Studies
- the Center for Chinese Studies
- the Center for Korean Studies
- the Center for Southeast Asia Studies, and
- the Center for Buddhist Studies.

Other research centers include:

- the Canadian Studies Program,
- the Center for African Studies,
- the Center for Latin American Studies,
- the Center for Middle Eastern Studies,
- the Center for South Asia Studies,
- the Institute of European Studies, and
- the Institute of Slavic, East European, and Eurasian Studies.
