= Vinod Aggarwal =

American political science professor (born 1953)

Vinod K. Aggarwal
- Born: November 26, 1953 (age 72); Seattle, Washington, U.S.

Academic background
- Education: Stanford University (Ph.D.); Stanford University (M.A.); University of Michigan (B.A.)

Academic work
- Discipline: International political economy
- Notable ideas: Nested Institutional Design; International Trade Regimes

Vinod K. Aggarwal (born November 26, 1953) is an American professor and holds the Alann P. Bedford Endowed Chair of Asian Studies in the Travers Department of Political Science. He is an Affiliated Professor in the Haas School of Business, and directs the Berkeley APEC Study Center (BASC). He is a visiting professor at INSEAD's Asia campus, a blogger for the Harvard Business Review, and has contributed to the New York Times. He also serves as Editor-in-Chief of the journal Business and Politics. Aggarwal is a frequent commentator and author about issues related to international political economy. He has appeared on the Korean television show Great Minds in 2021 and in 2023–24. In addition, he appears regularly on American television.

== Early life ==
Born in Seattle, Washington, Aggarwal received his bachelor's degree in both political science and psychology from the University of Michigan in 1975, and his M.A in political science and Ph.D. in international political economy from Stanford University.

== Career ==
Prior to joining the faculty at UC Berkeley in 1980, he was a Research Fellow at the Brookings Institution, an American think-tank based in Washington, D.C., and professor at the Geneva Graduate Institute from 1988 to 1989 At UC Berkeley, he is the Alann P. Bedford Endowed Chair of Asian Studies in the Travers Department of Political Science and an Affiliated Professor in the Haas School of Business. He regularly teaches undergraduate and graduate courses on international political economy, international relations, and business and public policy. He also directs the Berkeley APEC Study Center (BASC) and is a visiting professor at INSEAD's Asia campus.

Aggarwal has been influential in the fields of U.S. trade policy, corporate strategy, international trade institutions, globalization, international debt rescheduling, international political economy, and international relations. His research expertise includes the international politics of trade, international finance, comparative public policy, rational choice, and bargaining theory. Frequently, he has been sought out in these areas by the private and public sector.

He has worked with a number of Fortune 500 corporations such as Cisco, Hewlett-Packard, and Qualcomm, as well as other companies including Herman Miller, Italcementi, ARCO, and Nestle. Aggarwal was named Chief Economist for the global growth consulting firm Frost and Sullivan. In the public sector, Aggarwal has consulted with the U.S. Department of Commerce, World Trade Organization, Organisation for Economic Co-operation and Development, the Group of Thirty (G30), IFAD, the International Labour Organization, ASEAN, and the World Bank. In November 2008, Dr. Aggarwal addressed the APEC CEO Summit in Lima, Peru.

In 2006, Aggarwal described Washington's selective trade policies as undermining the creation of an Asia-Pacific zone. He forecast that the mounting U.S. trade deficit with China would lead to failure in efforts to convert APEC into a Free Trade Area of the Pacific and said it would be "dead on arrival in Congress for the foreseeable future." Later, during the 2009 global recession of world markets, Aggarwal was a prominent critic of the Fortress Asia theory which speculated that East Asian countries such as China and Japan would align to become a protectionist trade bloc averse to Western imports. He has more recently focused on technology conflict between the U.S. and China, arguing that President Biden's efforts pursue high technology industrial policy would face serious domestic political problems.

== Honors ==
From 2003 to 2004, Aggarwal was a Fellow at the Woodrow Wilson Center, where he researched the pursuit of multiple modes of trade liberalization on the stability of the world trading system. From 2008 to 2009, Aggarwal was an Abe Fellow with the Japan Foundation. He is currently a fellow with the Center for Globalisation Research at the University of London, a member of the Council on Foreign Relations, and a founding member of the United States Asia Pacific Council.

Aggarwal has also been recognized for his teaching. He was the recipient of the Cheit Outstanding Teaching Award from the Haas School of Business for Ph.D. teaching in 1997. In 2003, he was first runner-up for the Cheit Award for MBA teaching, winning first place in 2005.

== Publications ==
Authored books

- 1997: Une nouvelle approche des phenomenes sociaux: Les horloges sociales (with Pierre Allan and Daniel Lachat)
- 1997: Le Renseignement strategique d'enterprise (with Pierre Allan and Daniel Lachat)
- 1996: Debt Games: Strategic Interactions in Debt Restructuring
- 1987: International Debt Threat: Bargaining Among Creditors and Debtors in the 1980s
- 1985: Liberal Protectionism: The International Politics of Organized Textile Trade

Articles and chapters

- Japan’s Leadership in the Liberal International Order: Impact and Policy Opportunities for Partners University of British Columbia. July 2020.
- New Economic Statecraft: Industrial Policy in an Era of Strategic Competition (with Andrew Reddie), Issues & Studies, Vol. 56, no. 2, June 2020.
- Cyber Industrial Policy in an Era of Strategic Competition (with Andrew W. Reddie). CLTC White Paper Series. May 2019.
- US-China Rivalry: Implications for East Asia Japan Spotlight. January/February 2019, pp. 4–9.
- Regulators Join Tech Rivalry with National-Security Blocks on Cross-Border Investment (with Andrew W. Reddie). Global Asia, Vol. 14, No. 1, March 2019.
- Comparative Industrial policy and Cybersecurity: The US Case (with Andrew W. Reddie). Journal of Cyber Policy. Vol. 3, No. 3, 2018, pp. 291–312.
- Comparative Industrial policy and Cybersecurity: A Framework for Analysis (with Andrew W. Reddie). Journal of Cyber Policy. Vol. 3, No. 3, 2018, pp. 452–266.
- Resisting Behind the Border Talks in TTIP: The Cases of GMOs and Data Privacy (with Simon Evenett). Business and Politics. Vol. 19, Issue 4, 2017.
- The Transatlantic Trade and Investment Partnership: Limits on Negotiating Behind the Border Barriers (with Simon Evenett). Business and Politics. Vol. 19, Issue 4, 2017.
- The Politics of TTIP: Negotiating Behind the Border Barriers (with Simon J. Evenett). In Ernest Gnan and Ralf Kronberger, eds. Schwerpunkt Außenwirtschaft 2015/2016 [Focus on Trade] (Vienna: Facultas Verlags- und Buchhandels AG), 2016, pp. 191–204.
- Designing Trade Institutions for Asia (with Min Gyo Koo). In Saadia Pekkanen, ed., Asian Designs, Cornell University Press, 2016, pp. 35–58.
- Mega-FTAs and the Trade-Security Nexus: The Trans-Pacific Partnership (TPP) and Regional Comprehensive Economic Partnership (RCEP) AsiaPacific Issues. No. 123, March 2016.
- Trade at Risk: Challenges to East Asia’s Export-Oriented Model (with Min Gyo Koo). Global Asia. Vol. 11, No. 3, Fall 2016, pp. 22–29.
- The Liberal Trading Order Under Assault: A US Perspective Global Asia. Vol. 11, No. 4, Winter 2016, pp. 110–113.
- Introduction: The Rise of Mega-FTAs in the Asia-Pacific Asian Survey. Vol. 56, No. 6, November/December 2016, pp. 1105–1116. Part of a Special Issue on Mega-FTAs in the Asia-Pacific, edited by Vinod K. Aggarwal.
- An Open Door? TTIP and Accession by Third Countries (with Simon J. Evenett). In J-F Morin, T. Novotna, F. Ponjaert, and M. Telo, eds., The TTIP in a Multipolar World (Farnham, UK: Ashgate Publishing), 2015.
- Must TTIP-induced regulatory convergence benefit others? (with Simon J. Evenett). In M. Sait Akman, Simon J. Evenett and Patrick Low, eds. Catalyst? TTIP's impact on the Rest (London: CEPR Press, 2015).
- Competitive Framing: Agricultural Protection and Trade Liberalization in the Korea-US FTA Negotiations (with Sonia Aggarwal). Ehwa Journal of Social Science. Vol. 31, No.2, 2015, pp. 5–35.
- Trade Institutions in Asia (with Min Gyo Koo). In Saadia Pekkanen, John Ravenhill, Rosemary Foot, eds., Oxford Handbook of the IR of Asia, Oxford University Press, 2014), pp. 703–718.
- Do WTO rules preclude industrial policy? Evidence from the global economic crisis (with Simon J. Evenett), "Business and Politics," Vol. 16, No. 4, pp. 481–509.
- A Fragmenting Global Economy: A Weakened WTO, Mega FTAs, and Murky Protectionism (with Simon J. Evenett), "Swiss Political Science Review," Vol. 19, No. 4, December 2013, pp. 550–557. Initially appeared as a CEPR discussion paper, December 2013.
- The ASEAN Economic Community 2015: Implications for Supply Chain Management (with Bora Park), "Supply Chain Asia," September–October 2013, pp. 20–21.
- U.S. Free Trade Agreements and Linkages, "International Negotiation, Vol. 18, 2013, pp. 89-110.
- Industrial Policy Choice during the Crisis Era (with Simon J. Evenett), "Oxford Review of Economic Policy," Vol. 28, Number 2, 2012, pp. 261–283.
- The Financial Crisis, 'New' Industrial Policy, and the Bite of Multilateral Trade Rules (with Simon J. Evenett), Asian Economic Policy Review, Vol. 5, Issue 2, 2010, pp. 221–244.
- Look West: The Evolution of U.S. Trade Policy Towards Asia Globalizations, Vol. 7, No. 4, 2010, pp. 455–473.
- I Don't Get No Respect: The Travails of IPE International Studies Quarterly, Vol. 54, No. 3, 2010, pp. 895–897.
- Beyond Bogor: Reflections on APEC's Future (with Peter Volberding), Japan Spotlight, September–October 2010, pp. 10–13.
- The Perils of Consensus (with Jonathan Chow), Review of International Political Economy, Vol. 17, No.2, May 2010, pp. 262–290.
- Reluctance to Lead: U.S. Trade Policy in Flux Business and Politics, Vol. 11, No. 3, August 2009, pp. 1–21.

Edited Books

- Responding to China's Rise: US and EU Strategies (with Sara Newland) (New York: Springer, 2014).
- Linking Trade and Security: Evolving Institutions and Strategies in Asia, Europe, and the United States (with Kristi Govella) (New York: Springer, 2012).
- Responding to a Resurgent Russia: Russian Policy and Responses from the EU and US (with Kristi Govella) (New York: Springer, 2011).
- Trade Policy in the Asia-Pacific: The Role of Ideas, Interests, and Domestic Institutions (with Seungjoo Lee) (New York: Springer, 2010).
- Northeast Asia Ripe for Integration? (The Political Economy of the Asia-Pacific) (with Min Gyo Koo, Seungjoo Lee, and Chung-in Moon), (Berkeley: Springer, 2008)
- Asia's New Institutional Architecture: Evolving Structures for Managing Trade, Financial, and Security Relations (with Min Gyo Koo), (Berkeley: Springer, 2007)
- Bilateral Trade Agreements in the Asia-Pacific (with Shujiro Urata) (New York: Routledge, 2006)
- European Union Trade Strategies: Between Regionalism and Globalism (with Edward Fogarty), (New York: Routledge, 2005)
- The Strategic Dynamics of Latin American Trade (with Ralph Espachand and Joseph Tulchin), (Palo Alto: Stanford University Press, 2004)
- Winning in Asia, U.S. Style: Market and Nonmarket Strategies for Success (New York: Palgrave Macmillan, 2003)
- Sovereign Debt: Origins, Crises and Restructuring (with Brigitte Granville) (London:RIIA, 2003).
- Winning in Asia, Japanese Style: Market and Nonmarket Strategies for Success (with Shujiro Urata) (New York: Palgrave, 2002). Translated into Japanese and published by Waseda University Press, 2004.
- Winning in Asia, European Style: Market and Nonmarket Strategies for Success (New York: Palgrave, 2001).
- Asia Pacific Crossroads: Regime Creation and the Future of APEC (with Charles Morrison) (New York: St. Martin's Press, 1998).
- Institutional Designs for a Complex World: Bargaining, Linkages and Nesting (Ithaca: Cornell University Press, 1998).
