= Natallia Hersche =

Political prisoner in Belarus

Natallia Hersche (also Natalie Hersche; Belarusian: Наталля Хершэ; Russian: Наталья Херше; born 20 October 1969, Orsha, Belarusian SSR, Soviet Union) is a Belarusian-born political prisoner. She has Belarusian and Swiss citizenships. During the 2020–2021 Belarusian protests, she pulled a balaclava away from a police officer, and was subsequently sentenced to two and a half years in prison, serving part of the sentence in a prison for men. She refused to ask for pardon, but was released in February 2022 after Switzerland sent an ambassador to Belarus, breaking diplomatic isolation of the country.

== Early life ==
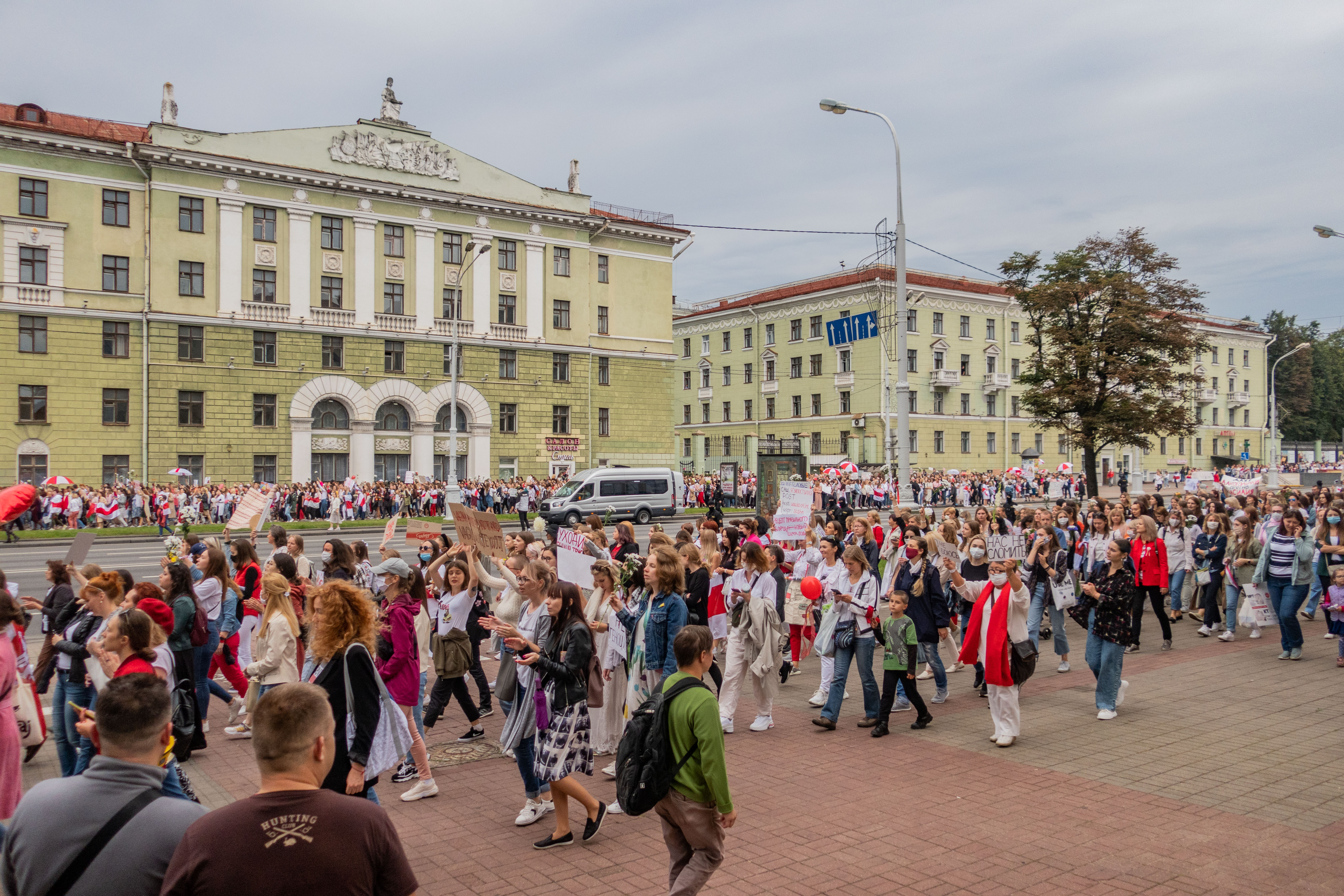
All-Women march on 29 August 2020, in Minsk, Belarus.

Hersche was born in Orsha in northeastern Belarus. She received a degree in economics from Belarusian State Economic University and worked in Orsha. In c. 2009, she was engaged to a Swiss national and moved to St. Gallen. She worked at a local brewery and later at a tableware production company in the quality control department. After her husband died, she married another Swiss. Hersche has two children from her first marriage.

== Detention ==
Hersche visited Belarus every year. On 11 September 2020, Hersche returned to Minsk. She intended to return to Switzerland on 21 September and had a return ticket. On 19 September, she met with a friend and decided to attend the peaceful assembly, the "All-Women march". During this march, the riot police used force to disperse women and detained a group of them. Riot police officer Siarhei Konchyk tried to put Hersche into the police bus, but she grabbed his mask instead. She was arrested for "participation in an unauthorized mass event". Her actions led to a criminal case under article 363 of Belarusian Criminal Code — "resistance to a police officer". For some time, Hersche was in one cell with professional basketball player Yelena Leuchanka, who reported about the overcrowding in cells that forced several women to sleep on the floor. Leuchanka also told journalists about the lack of water and necessary hygiene products.

Konchyk claimed that he experienced physical and mental suffering and estimated his suffering at 500 BYN (then — at 1000 BYN). Hersche confirmed that she tried to remove his mask, but stated that she did not touch his face. As she was arrested during the march, she was not able to return to Switzerland. On 3 December 2020, her trial in Saviecki District Court of Minsk started, and on 7 December Judge Siarhei Shatsila sentenced her to 2.5 years of prison. According to Belarusian human rights organizations, Hersche's actions could not be treated as resistance because Hersche tried only to remove the balaclava. Therefore, they stated, her actions can hardly be qualified as a resistance and the sentence is disproportionate. They also cited paragraph 131 of the OSCE Guidelines on Freedom of Peaceful Assembly and noted that the authorities had to protect the assembly due to its fully peaceful nature.

Her imprisonment became an issue in Belarus-Switzerland relations, and major Swiss media occasionally publish articles about her. Swiss parliamentarians and the Libereco human rights organisation started a campaign for her release.

Originally, Hersche was put in a correctional colony for women in Homiel. This colony sews clothes for the police and army, and Hersche refused to do that. In March 2021, she started a hunger strike. In September 2021, she was transferred to the prison in Mahilioŭ which is the strictest type of penitentiary in Belarus. It was noted that Belarus has no prisons for women, and transfer of women to prisons is rare.

The authorities attempted to compel her to ask Aleksandr Lukashenko for pardon, but Hersche refused, claiming she was innocent.

On 18 February 2022, she was suddenly released ahead of schedule. She lost 6 kg of weight and one third of hair. She associated her release with the arrival of Swiss ambassador to Minsk.

== See also ==
- Human rights in Belarus
