= Berkeley APEC Study Center =

Research center at the University of California

- BASC
- Established: October 1996
- Director: Vinod Aggarwal
- Location: University of California, Berkeley, United States
- Coordinates: 37.870°N 122.258°W
- Website: basc.berkeley.edu

The Berkeley APEC Study Center (BASC) is a research center at the University of California, Berkeley. Created in 1996 in response to an initiative by U.S. President Bill Clinton, the center undertakes research, disseminates information and facilitates discussion on issue related to APEC (Asia-Pacific Economic Cooperation) involving political, economic and business trends in the Asia-Pacific region.

The Berkeley center is part of the APEC Study Centers Consortium (ASCC), a network of over a hundred research institutions and university centers across twenty APEC member economies. In addition to the Berkeley center, sister APEC centers are headquartered at Columbia University, Brown University, the Royal Melbourne Institute of Technology, the Taiwan Institute of Economic Research, Hong Kong University, Kobe University, Nankai University, and the University of Indonesia. For the past several years, the Berkeley center has served as co-chair of the U.S. Consortium of APEC Study Centers.

Since its establishment, the center has published over a dozen volumes related to trade and economy in the Asia-Pacific region. It sponsors conferences, symposia, and visiting lecturers. In addition to participating in ASCC conferences in Australia, Peru, Singapore, and Japan, the center has hosted conferences pertaining to the rise of China, the economic resurgence of Russia, Industrial Policy in the Post-Financial Crisis Era, and Mega Free Trade Agreements such as the Trans-Pacific Partnership (TPP), the Regional Comprehensive Economic Partnership (RCEP) and the Transatlantic Trade and Investment Partnership (TTIP) on the UC Berkeley and Stanford University campuses.

== History and mission ==
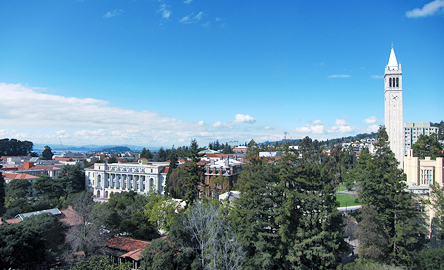
The Berkeley APEC Study Center overlooks the Berkeley central campus and the San Francisco Bay.

The University of California, Berkeley established the APEC Study Center in October 1996 at the request of the U.S. Department of State in response to the APEC Leaders' Education Initiative introduced by President Bill Clinton. The initiative was endorsed on November 20, 1993 by the leaders of the other APEC member nations at their historic meeting "held in a Native American-style long house on Blake Island, a state park in Puget Sound, in Kitsap County" near Seattle. This initiative called on institutions of higher education in the United States and throughout the Asia-Pacific region to collaborate on "Asia-Pacific policy research, and through exchanges, joint research, conferences and other contacts, to help establish an emerging region-wide network of personal and institutional relationships for all member economies." Conducting policy research on Asia-Pacific issues and exchanging ideas and technologies, students and scholars engaged in advanced studies of regional economic importance became the guidelines for BASC's research agenda.

BASC conducts multidisciplinary research activities that analyze political, economic and business trends in the Asia-Pacific region with a special emphasis on the APEC forum. The center also provides academic supports for the dissemination of APEC's mission and conducts "international conferences, colloquia, and outreach to the business and policy community." BASC is currently engaged in researching domestic determinants of East Asian regionalism, the effects of the rise of Russia, India and China on the U.S.-EU transatlantic alliance, the growing prevalence of Industrial Policy in the Post-Financial Crisis Era, and the effects and implications of Mega Free Trade Agreements such as the Trans-Pacific Partnership (TPP), the Regional Comprehensive Economic Partnership (RCEP) and the Transatlantic Trade and Investment Partnership (TTIP). Previous areas of research include Northeast Asian and Asian institutional architecture, bilateral trade agreements in the Asia-Pacific, EU transregionalism strategies, and strategies for international trade and politics in Latin America.

== Staff and publications ==
The center is directed by Dr. Vinod Aggarwal, an eminent international political economist. In addition to serving as directory, Aggarwal is a Professor in the Department of Political Science, an Affiliated Professor in the Business and Public Policy group in the Haas School of Business at the University of California, Berkeley, and Co-Chair of the U.S. Consortium of APEC Study Centers. Its project directors include Andrew Reddie and Bora Park.

Research affiliates include Professor Cédric Dupont of the Graduate Institute of International Studies in Geneva, Switzerland; Professor Seung Joo Lee at Chung-Ang University in Seoul, Korea; Professor Min Gyo Koo at Seoul's Yonsei University, John Ravenhill, Director of the Balsille School of International Affairs and Professor of Political Science at the University of Waterloo, and Professor Shujiro Urata at Waseda University in Tokyo, Japan.

Members of the center research, teach, write books, articles, blogs, and podcasts. BASC publications include a large number of books and journal articles, as well as an annual newsletter. The center's newsletter is available for download on its website. The center hosts a research blog that publishes commentaries by its staff and research affiliates. The center also has affiliates and alumni who participate in BASC projects each year.

== See also ==
- Asia-Pacific Economic Cooperation
- Trans-Pacific Strategic Economic Partnership
