= Ekaterina Zhuravskaya =

Professor of Economics

- Екатерина Журавская
- Born: August 1972 (age 54); Moscow, Russian SFSR, Soviet Union
- Education: Moscow State University, London School of Economics, Harvard University
- Spouse: Sergey Guriev
- Awards: Birgit Grodal Award Winner, 2018; Best Economist prize from the Russian Academy of Sciences, 2002 and 2003; Diploma of the Russia’s National Award for Work in Applied Economics, 2010 and 2014
- Scientific career
- Fields: Economics
- Workplaces: New Economic School, Paris School of Economics
- Doctoral advisor: Andrei Shleifer, Alberto Alesina, and David Cutler
- Website: https://www.parisschoolofeconomics.com/zhuravskaya-ekaterina/

Ekaterina Vsevolodovna Zhuravskaya (Russian: Екатерина Всеволодовна Журавская; born August 1972) is a Russian economist serving as Professor of Economics at the Paris School of Economics and EHESS. She was formerly a professor at New Economic School in Moscow and the academic director of the Center for Economic and Financial Research, the school's policy-oriented think tank. She was the 2018 recipient of the Birgit Grodal. She was given a biennial award as a "a European-based female economist who has made a significant contribution to the Economics profession." In 2021 she was named a Fellow of the Econometric Society. She is the most cited female French economist according to IDEAS.

In 2003-04, Zhuravskaya was a member of the Institute for Advanced Study in Princeton, NJ. In the past, she has held roles at Columbia University where she was involved in the Initiative for Policy Dialogue, at the University of Michigan's William Davidson Institute where she was a research affiliate, and as a tax consultant at HIID. She also worked on the Russia Transition Project at HIID and a Banking Crisis Project at the Russian Privatization Center in Moscow.

Zhuravskaya currently holds various roles in academia. She is Director of Studies at the School for Advanced Studies in the Social Sciences -- a role which she has held since 2010. She is also an associate member and associate chairwoman at the Paris School of Economics -- since 2010 and 2013, respectively. She is also a Research Fellow at the Centre for Economic Policy Research in London, UK, where she focuses on public economics and development economics. She is also a co-editor in the Economic Journal (since 2019) and American Economic Review (since 2023); previously, she was an associate editor at the Journal of Public Economics (2008-2018)and associate editor at the Journal of Comparative Economics (2007-2017).

Her research focuses on empirical political economics and the economics of the media. In recent years, she has studied factors that make ethnic diversity important for conflict and economic development, including the impact of forced mass movements of ethnic groups in Eastern Europe and from Eastern Europe to Central Asia during WWII, the impact of ethnic occupational segregation on ethnic tensions in the context of historical anti-Jewish violence in Europe, and the impact of political manipulation on ethnic conflict in Central Asia. She has taught courses such as Advanced topics in empirical political economy and development, Introduction to political economy, Development economy, a research seminar "Themes in history and economic development", and Behavioral finance. She has also published research in an array of different microeconomic and macroeconomic disciplines. Here is a short list from her CV: Fiscal Federalism, arbitrage in the stock market, tax arrears in Russia concerning liquidity and federal redistribution, entrepreneurs in Russia, religions in Russia, Chinese entrepreneurs, bias in Russian commercial courts, decentralization, and political institutions, revision to privatization in socialist regimes, the media and political persuasion, forced migration, and the effects of social media on politics,

== Academic and professional awards ==
- CNRS Silver Medal, 2019
- The Birgit Grodal Prize, EEA, 2018 (awarded every two years to a female European economist having made a significant contribution in the discipline)
- The Montias Prize for the best article published in the Journal of Comparative Economics in two years, 2014–2015
- Consolidator Grant from the European Research Council (ERC) (1.6 million euros for 5 years), to from november 2015
- The Grand Prize of the Russian National Prize for the best research in applied economics, 2016
- Diploma of the Russian National Prize for Best Research in Applied Economics, 2016
- Diploma of the Russian National Prize for the best research in applied economics, 2014
- The “Excellence in Refereeing” Award, American Economic Review, 2011
- W. Leontief International Medal "Contribution to Economic Reforms", awarded in 2010
- Professor of the year at the New Economic School (Moscow), awarded by the alumni association students for the academic year 2009–2010
- Diploma of the National Prize of Russia for the Best Research in Applied Economics, 2010
- The first prize (gold medal) in the GDN medal competition for development researchment, 2006
- Best Economist Award, Russian Academy of Sciences, 2002 and 2003
- World leader for tomorrow, World Economic Forum, Davos, 2001–2004
- The Zvi Griliches Award of Excellence for Research in Economics, Economic Education and Research Consortium, 2000
- The Prize of the Competition for young university economists of the Fifth Nobel eco-symposium, "Economics of Transition", 1999
- “Hans Rausing Professorship” funded by the Lisbet Rausing Foundation, 1998–2009
- Nemchinov Merit Fellowship, Moscow State University, 1990–1993
- Gold Medal of Distinction upon Graduation from High School, 1989

== Selected works ==
- Wurgler, Jeffrey; Zhuravskaya, Ekaterina (2002). "Does arbitrage flatten demand curves for stocks?". The Journal of Business. 75 (4): 583–608. doi:10.1086/341636. JSTOR 10.1086/341636.
- Zhuravskaya, Ekaterina V. (2000). "Incentives to provide local public goods: fiscal federalism, Russian style" (PDF). Journal of Public Economics. 76 (3): 337–368. doi:10.1016/s0047-2727(99)00090-0.
- Akhmedov, Akhmed; Zhuravskaya, Ekaterina (2004). "Opportunistic political cycles: test in a young democracy setting" (PDF). The Quarterly Journal of Economics. 119 (4): 1301–1338. doi:10.1162/0033553042476206. JSTOR 25098719. S2CID 14876586.
- Enikolopov, Ruben; Zhuravskaya, Ekaterina (2007). "Decentralization and political institutions" (PDF). Journal of Public Economics. 91 (11–12): 2261–2290. doi:10.1016/j.jpubeco.2007.02.006. S2CID 25887448.
- Enikolopov, Ruben; Petrova, Maria; Zhuravskaya, Ekaterina (2011). "Media and political persuasion: Evidence from Russia" (PDF). American Economic Review. 101 (7): 3253–85. doi:10.1257/aer.101.7.3253. JSTOR 41408737. S2CID 15193676.
