= Spin Dictators =

2022 political science book

Spin Dictators: The Changing Face of Tyranny in the 21st Century
- First edition
- Author: Sergey Guriyev; Daniel Treisman
- Subject: Political science
- Publisher: Princeton University Press
- Publication date: 2022
- Media type: Print
- Pages: 360
- Website: spindictators.com

Spin Dictators: The Changing Face of Tyranny in the 21st Century is a political science book by Russian economist Sergey Guriyev and American political scientist Daniel Treisman. It examines how modern dictators and autocrats – pioneered by Lee Kuan Yew of Singapore and Alberto Fujimori of Peru, and replicated by Vladimir Putin of Russia, Recep Tayyip Erdoğan of Turkey, and Viktor Orbán of Hungary – focus more on propaganda methods such as spin, disinformation, and psychologically keeping their populations in fear of the Other (imagocracy), instead of the more overtly brutal methods of political repression favoured by dictators of the past such as Joseph Stalin of the Soviet Union or Mao Zedong of China.

The authors contend that modern "spin dictators" pretend to be democrats (for example, allowing a select group of high-brow, but low-circulation, dissident newspapers to exist to show that they respect the freedom of the press), but still use their power to suppress dissent (for example, increasing tax demands on independent broadcasters, or such outlets being bought by the leader's cronies; or accusing independent broadcasters of publishing fake news and shutting them down). Thus, these authoritarian leaders manipulate the media, rather than totally censor or suppress it, and are thus more popular among the people. The book also discusses the sympathies between spin dictators and democratic populists such as American president Donald Trump.

Putinist Russia during the 2000s and early 2010s was both a trigger and a key example for this theory. But the regime's sharp turn toward greater repressions in mid 2010–2020s culminating with the 2022 Russian invasion of Ukraine raised the question of the prerequisites for that change. In an article written specifically for Re: Russia, Daniel Treisman argues that this reverse evolution was caused not by the conservatism and imperial ambitions of the Russian population, as is commonly believed, but rather by the ongoing process of social modernisation, which Putin's spin dictatorship could no longer control.
