= John Zysman =

John Zysman (born 1946) is a professor of Political Science at the University of California, Berkeley and co-founder of the Berkeley Roundtable on the International Economy (BRIE). Professor Zysman received his B.A at Harvard and his Ph.D. at MIT. He has written extensively on European and Japanese policy and corporate strategy; his interests also include comparative politics, Western European politics, political economy and energy policy.

Zysman's 1987 publication, Manufacturing Matters: The Myth of the Post-Industrial Economy (with Stephen S. Cohen), was identified by Business Week as one of the year's top ten books. Since his book Manufacturing Matters, Zysman has significantly redefined the understanding of how different sectors interact in the global division of labor, and how technology dynamics and political economy link. This has made him a key advisor and frequent speaker to governments, non-governmental organizations and corporations in Europe, Asia and the US on how to deal with globalization and how to enhance competitiveness.

Zysman has been a member of the Steering Committee, University of California Industry-University Cooperative Research Program. He has been on the Editorial Boards: The New Political Economy; Industrial and Corporate Change; Industry and Innovation. He was a member of the Faculty Executive Board, Clausen Center for International Business and Policy, Haas School of Business, University of California, Berkeley. He is also Council Member, Council on Foreign Relations and Council Member, Pacific Council on International Policy. Previously, Zysman has served on the Director's Advisory Board, Lawrence Livermore National Laboratory, the Industrial Advisory Board, Los Alamos National Laboratories and Scientific Board, Centre d'Etudes Prospectives et d'Informations Internationales.

== Published books include ==
- Governments, Markets, and Growth: Finance and the Politics of Industrial Change (Cornell University Press, 1983)
- American Industry in International Competition: Government Policies And Corporate Strategies (Cornell University Press, 1984)
- Manufacturing Matters: The Myth of the Post-Industrial Economy (Basic Books, 1987)
- The Highest Stakes: The Economic Foundations of the Next Security System (Oxford University Press, 1992)
- The Tunnel at the End of the Light: Business Networks and Market Development in Russia (Copenhagen Business School Press, 1998)
- Enlarging Europe: The Industrial Foundations of a New Political Reality (Copenhagen Business School Press, 1998)
- Tracking a Transformation: E-Commerce and the Terms of Competition in Industries (Brookings Press, June 2001)
- The Politics of Greed: How Privatization Structured Politics in Central and Eastern Europe (Rowman & Littlefield Publishers, 2006)
- How Revolutionary Was the Digital Revolution? National Responses, Market Transitions, and Global Technology (Stanford Business Books), (2006)

For a full list of publications, see Zysman's CV on the Berkeley Faculty website.
