= New Economic School =

Higher education institution in Moscow

Coordinates: 55.6980°N 37.3940°E

- Российская экономическая школа
- Motto: Never Ending Success
- Type: private
- Established: 1992
- President: Shlomo Weber
- Rector: Anton Suvorov
- Faculty: 54 (2019)
- Students: 457 (2019)
- Undergraduates: 279
- Postgraduates: 178
- Location: Moscow, Russia
- Campus: Skolkovo
- Nickname: NES
- Website: www.nes.ru

The New Economic School (abbr. NES, known in Russian: Российская экономическая школа, РЭШ, lit. 'Russian Economic School') is a private institution of higher learning offering undergraduate and graduate programs in economics and finance in Moscow, Russia.

== Academic programs ==
- Bachelor of Arts in Economics, a joint program of NES and Higher School of Economics

Economics of Energy and Natural Resources

- Master of Arts in Energy Economics (MAEE) – applied magistrate (2 years)
- Master of Science in Energy Economics (MSEE) – professional retraining program (1 year)

Finance, investments, banks (MA / MSc in finance, MAF, MSF)

- Master of Arts in finance – applied magistrate (2 years)
- Master of Science in finance – professional retraining program (1 year)
- Masters in Finance, MiF

== Alumni and students ==
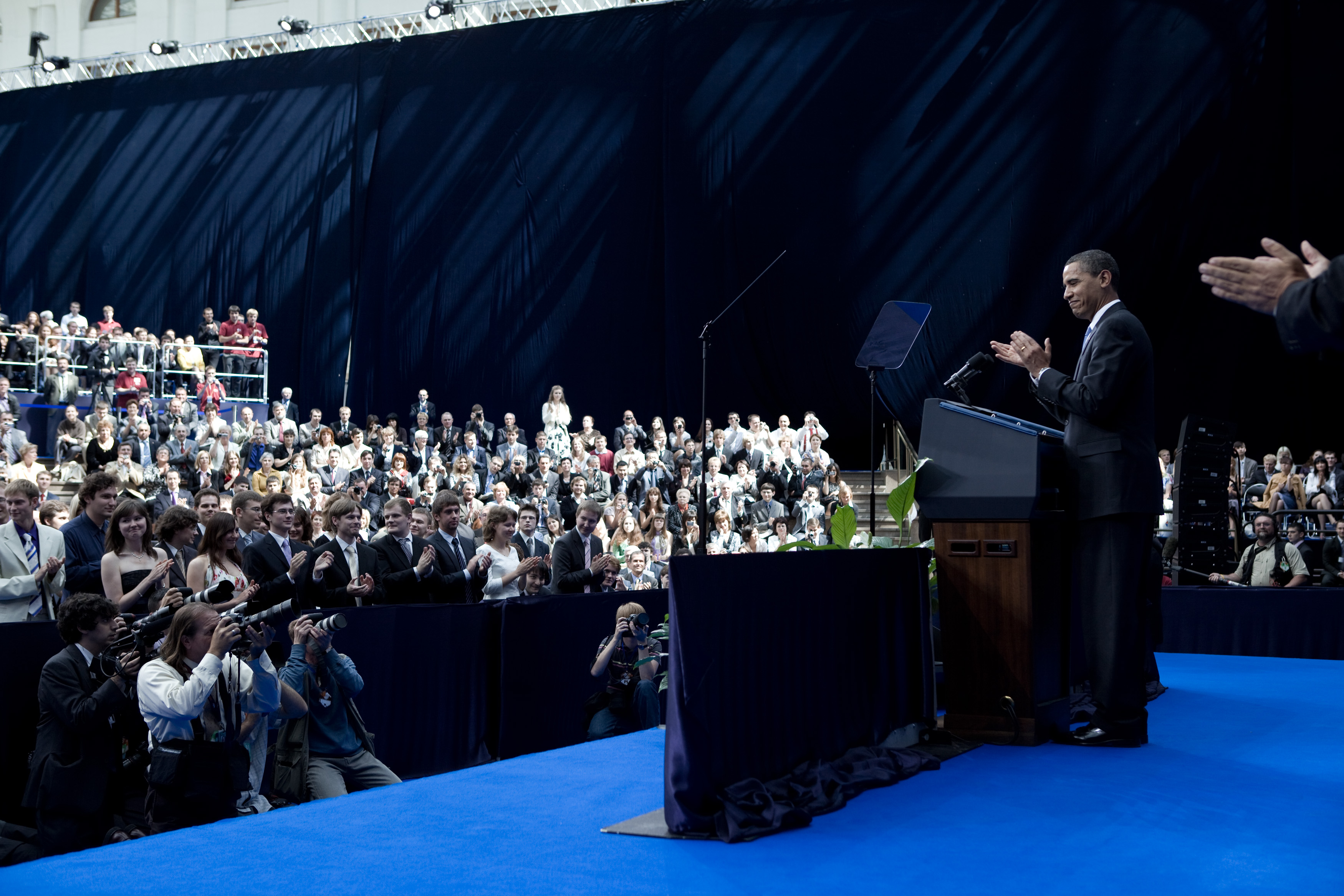
President Barack Obama delivers remarks at the New Economic School graduation in Gostinny Dvor, Moscow, July 7, 2009

Currently, 2390 economists have graduated from NES. Of those, 90% have a career in the private sector. Some 350 NES graduates continued their studies through to PhD programmes.

More than 80 NES alumni who received their PhDs work as faculty in economics, finance, management, accounting, and mathematics in US, UK, European, Asian, and Australian universities such as MIT, Princeton University, Stanford, Yale, the University of California, Berkeley, Columbia, UPenn, NYU, LSE, LBS and others, in the World Bank and the International Monetary Fund.

Among the most prominent NES alumni are

- Arkady Dvorkovich (1994), the FIDE President,
- Ekaterina Zhuravskaya (1994), professor at the Paris School of Economics and the 2018 recipient of the Birgit Grodal Award,
- Konstantin Sonin (1998), professor at the University of Chicago and the 2020 recipient of the Yegor Gaidar Memorial Award,
- Anna Mikusheva (2001), professor at the Massachusetts Institute of Technology and the 2012 recipient of the Elaine Bennett Research Prize,
- Ruben Enikolopov (Russian: Рубен Ениколопов) (2002), professor at the Pompeu Fabra University and the 2020 recipient of the Yegor Gaidar Memorial Award,
- Alex Gerko (2003), founder of trading firm XTX Markets,
- Oleg Itskhoki (2004), professor at University of California, Los Angeles and the winner of the 2022 John Bates Clark Award,
- Nik Storonsky (2007), co-founder and CEO of Revolut.

More than 90% of NES professors have PhDs in economics and finance from universities, such as Harvard, MIT, Columbia, NYU, LBS, Wisconsin-Madison, Northwestern University, and others. New Economic School is the first Russian university that has started hiring professors from abroad.

There are research centres at NES: the Center for Demographic Research (CDR), which was created in 2011, and the Center for the Study of Diversity and Social Interactions (CSDSI), established in 2013 in cooperation with the head researcher, Professor Shlomo Weber, and the Center for Economic and Financial Research (CEFIR).

== Rankings ==
Starting in early 2000s, the New Economic School has been consistently ranked at:

- the 1st or 2nd place among Russian universities by the number of publications in leading international journals of economics and finance, according to the Tilburg University Ranking
- the 1st or 2nd place among Russian universities by the number of citations per one scientific publication, according to QS Rankings
- the 1st place among Institutions for Economic Studies in Russia, according to RePEc
- 2nd place in Russia, according to Shanghai Academic Ranking of World Universities (ARWU) in Economics Academic Subject (2017)

== History ==
The New Economic School was founded by Valery Makarov (Russian: Валерий Леонидович Макаров, director of the Central Economic Mathematical Institute (CEMI) and Gur Ofer, a professor at the Hebrew University of Jerusalem in 1992. The initial funding was provided by the Russian government and Western foundations focused on developing education in Russia. As the idea was to provide Russian students, already well-trained in mathematics and statistics, with access to world-class education in economics, the NES teaching was set to be a 2-year full-time master-level program with a curriculum modeled on the first two years of PhD programs in top US and UK universities.

The first class that started their study in the Fall of 1992 was a mix of graduates and senior students from top math or math economics departments in Moscow. Core teaching in mathematics and statistics was done by CEMI mathematicians Vladimir Danilov, Vladimir Levin, Fedor Zak, Vladimir Rotar, and others. For core teaching in economics, econometrics, and finance NES relied on visiting professors and advisors, which included Zvi Griliches, Don Patinkin, Andreu Mas-Colell, Bronwyn Hall, Ben Bental, Elhanan Ben-Porath, Michael Ellman, Itzhak Zilcha, Thomas Sjostrom, Brigitte Granville, Avner Bar-Ilan, James Leitzel, Daniel Kahn, Leonid Polishchuk, Judith Shapiro, and many others. A critical leadership role was played, in addition to Makarov and Ofer, by Penn State professor Barry Ickes; key local administrators included Zarema Kasabieva, Alexander Friedman, Valentina Krupina, and Oxana Budjko.

In 1998, NES launched an initiative to build a local faculty, with hiring and promotion decisions at the tenure track and tenure level in accord with international standards. Initially, a subcommittee of the International Advisory Board played the role of the department faculty meeting, with local faculty being added as soon as they were granted tenure. The initiative started with hiring Sergey Guriyev (PhD, Moscow Institute of Physics and Technology) in 1999, Stanislav Anatolyev (NES'95, PhD University of Wisconsin), and Kirill Sosunov (NES'96, PhD Australian National University) in 2000, and Konstantin Sonin (NES'98, PhD Moscow State University) and Oleg Zamulin (PhD, University of Michigan) in 2001. The first tenure was granted to Guriev in 2003, followed by that to Ekaterina Zhuravskaya (NES'94, PhD Harvard) in 2005, Anatolyev in 2007, and Sonin in 2008.

== Campus ==
In 2014, NES moved to a new campus in Skolkovo, built for the purposes of academic life, and combining modern auditoria with sports and recreation facilities.
