= Aleksei Yegorov (jurist) =

Belarusian jurist (born 1969)

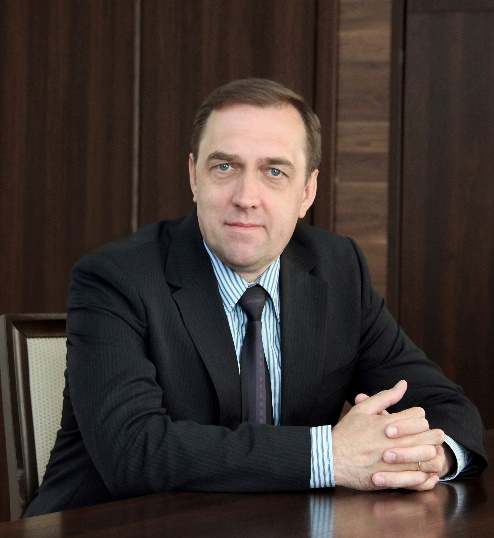
- Yegorov in 2024

Member of the House of Representatives
- In office 2019–2024

Personal details
- Born: 16 December 1969 (age 56) Novosokolniki, Russia, Soviet Union
- Party: Independent

Aleksei Vladimirovich Yegorov (Russian: Алексей Владимирович Егоров; born 16 December 1969) is a Russian-born Belarusian jurist serving as rector of Belarus State Economic University since 2021. From 2019 to 2024, he was a member of the House of Representatives. From 2014 to 2020, he served as rector of Vitebsk State University.
