= Konstantin Sonin =

Russian economist

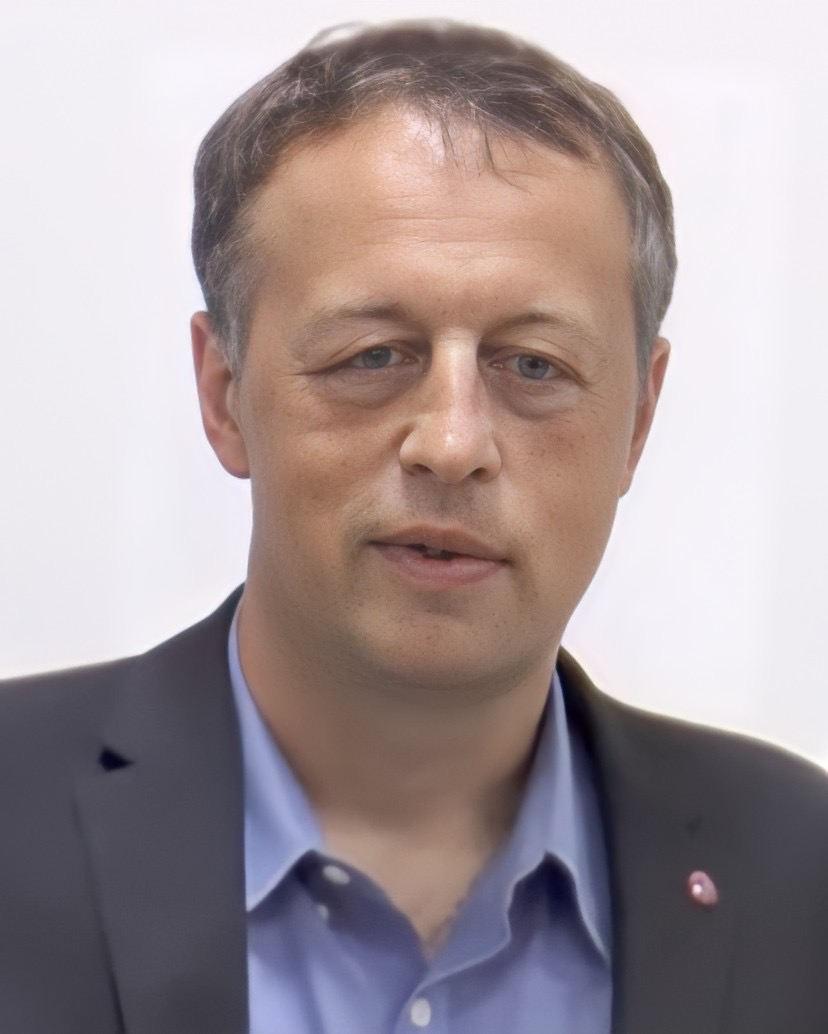
- Born: February 22, 1972 (age 54); Moscow

Academic background
- Education: Moscow State University

Academic work
- Discipline: Political economy, Development economics, Economic theory
- Institutions: University of Chicago,
- Awards: Gaidar Memorial Prize (2020)
- Website: Information at IDEAS / RePEc

Konstantin Sonin is a Russian economist. He is a professor at the University of Chicago Harris School of Public Policy, research fellow at the Centre for Economic Policy Research (CEPR), London, and an associate research fellow at the Stockholm Institute of Transition Economics. In recognition for his outstanding research in the field of political economy, in December 2015, he was named the John Dewey Distinguished Service Professor of the University of Chicago.

Sonin is the co-founder of the joint HSE-NES Bachelor of Arts Program. Until December 2014, Sonin was Vice Rector at the Higher School of Economics, but was forced to resign for political reasons. Until August 2013, he was Professor of Economics and Vice Rector at the New Economic School. His primary research interests are in political economics, development economics, conflict, and economic theory.

Sonin has been published in leading academic journals in economics and political science, such as American Economic Review, Quarterly Journal of Economics, Econometrica, Review of Economic Studies, American Journal of Political Science, Quarterly Journal of Political Science and others.

Sonin has been a columnist for Vedomosti (in Russian) in 2004-2020 and The Moscow Times in 2004-2017. He contributes to major international and Russian media outlets. He is the author of "Sonin.ru: Lessons of Economics" (in Russian), a book aimed to a wide audience. In 2019, a new edition of the book was published, titled "When the Oil Runs Out and Other Economics Lessons" (in Russian).

In 2023, Sonin was placed on the Federal Wanted list in Russia (Sonin lives in Chicago); the criminal case against him is based on information that he published in 2022 about the Bucha massacre and the Siege of Mariupol.

An arrest warrant was issued for Sonin in February 2024.

== Biography ==
Sonin was born in Moscow. He received his MSc in 1995, and PhD from Faculty of Mechanics and Mathematics of Moscow State University in 1998. Initially an algebraist, he transitioned to economics after 2000–01, when he was appointed a Post-Doctoral Fellow at the Davis Center for Russian studies at Harvard. In 2001, he joined New Economic School as an Assistant Professor and in 2009 received tenure as a full Professor of Economics. In 2011–13, he was Vice Rector at New Economic School responsible for creating an NES undergraduate program. In August 2013, he moved to become Professor of Economics at the Higher School of Economics. In August 2013 - January 2015, he was Vice Rector at the Higher School of Economics. Sonin is a co-founder of the joint HSE-NES Bachelor of Arts Program.

In 2004–2005, he was a member at the Institute for Advanced Study in Princeton, USA. In September 2009 – March 2010 he worked as a Visiting Professor of Managerial Economics and Decision Sciences at the Kellogg School of Management at Northwestern University. In May 2014 Konstantin was a visiting scholar in Becker Friedman Institute for Research in Economics at the University of Chicago.

Since September 2015, Konstantin Sonin has been a professor at the University of Chicago.

== Awards and memberships ==
- Yegor Gaidar Memorial Award, 2020
- Member of the Science Council of the Ministry of Education and Science of the Russian Federation (2013 - 2017)
- Prime-Minister Award for Excellence in Teaching and Research, 2012
- Research Medal of the Global Development Network, 2004 (1st), 2006, 2009 (2nd)
- B. L. Ovsievich Memorial Prize, 2009
- Award for a Best Economist of the Russian Academy of Science, 2002, 2003

== Other affiliations and memberships ==
- Research Director of the Center for Advanced Study at Higher School of Economics,
- Bank of Finland Institute for Economies in Transition, member of the Scientific Advisory Board
- Kyiv School of Economics, member of the International Advisory Board
- Center for Economic Policy Research, London, UK, Research Fellow
- Journal of the European Economic Association, Associate Editor (till 2017)
- European Journal of Political Economy, member of the Editorial Board (till 2017)
- Journal of Comparative Economics, member of the Editorial Board (till 2017)

== Major publications ==
- Sonin, Konstantin (December 2003). "Why the rich may favor poor protection of property rights" (PDF). Journal of Comparative Economics. 31 (4): 715–731. doi:10.1016/j.jce.2003.09.005. hdl:2027.42/39929. SSRN 386102. Pdf.

Reprinted as: Sonin, Konstantin (2008), "Why the rich may favor poor protection of property rights", in Henrekson, Magnus; Douhan, Robin (eds.), The political economy of entrepreneurship, The International Library of Entrepreneurship Series, Cheltenham, UK Northampton, Massachusetts: Edward Elgar, ISBN 9781845421878.

- Sonin, Konstantin; Acemoglu, Daron; Egorov, Georgy (October 2008). "Coalition formation in non-democracies". The Review of Economic Studies. 75 (4): 987–1009. doi:10.1111/j.1467-937X.2008.00503.x. hdl:1721.1/63329. S2CID 14963303. SSRN 386102.
- Sonin, Konstantin; Guriev, Sergei; Egorov, Georgy (November 2009). "Why resource-poor dictators allow freer media: a theory and evidence from panel data". The Review of Economic Studies. 103 (4): 645–668. doi:10.1017/S0003055409990219. JSTOR 27798530. S2CID 56446515. SSRN 898888.
- Sonin, Konstantin; Guriev, Sergei; Kolotilin, Anton (August 2011). "Determinants of nationalization in the oil Sector: a theory and evidence from panel data". Journal of Law, Economics, and Organization. 27 (2): 301–323. doi:10.1093/jleo/ewp011. SSRN 1103019.
- Sonin, Konstantin; Egorov, Georgy (October 2011). "Dictators and their viziers: endogenizing the loyalty-competence trade-off". Journal of the European Economic Association. 9 (5): 903–930. doi:10.1111/j.1542-4774.2011.01033.x. SSRN 630503.
- Sonin, Konstantin; Enikolopov, Ruben; Korovkin, Vasily; Petrova, Maria; Zakharov, Alexei (8 January 2013). "Field experiment estimate of electoral fraud in Russian parliamentary elections". Proceedings of the National Academy of Sciences. 110 (2): 448–452. Bibcode:2013PNAS..110..448E. doi:10.1073/pnas.1206770110. PMC 3545790. PMID 23267093. SSRN 2193638.
- Sonin, Konstantin; Acemoglu, Daron; Egorov, Georgy (May 2013). "A political theory of populism" (PDF). Quarterly Journal of Economics. 128 (2): 771–805. doi:10.1093/qje/qjs077.
- Sonin, Konstantin; Gehlbach, Scott (October 2014). "Government control of the media". Journal of Public Economics. 118 (C): 163–171. doi:10.1016/j.jpubeco.2014.06.004. SSRN 1315882.
- Sonin, Konstantin; Acemoglu, Daron; Egorov, Georgy (October 2015). "Political economy in a changing world" (PDF). Journal of Political Economy. 123 (5): 1038–1086. doi:10.1086/682679. hdl:1721.1/113624. JSTOR 10.1086/682679. S2CID 605524. SSRN 2281557.
