= Brigitte Granville =

French economist

- Born: 3 October 1957 (age 69); France

Academic background
- Education: University of Burgundy (M.Econ., 1979); Institute of Development Studies (MPhil, 1982); European University Institute (Ph.D, 1997)

Academic work
- Discipline: Macroeconomics, monetary economics
- School or tradition: Classical economics
- Institutions: Queen Mary University of London 2004– New Economic School 1995–97
- Awards: Chevalier des palmes académiques (Knight in the Order of Academic Palms) (2007)
- Website: Information at IDEAS / RePEc

Brigitte Evelyne Granville (born 1957) is an economist with dual French and British nationality. She is professor of International Economics and Economic Policy and Head of the Department of Business Analytics and Applied Economics at Queen Mary Business School, Queen Mary University of London.

Her work centres on monetary economics, in particular inflation and the credibility of monetary policy, European monetary integration and the economic transformation of post-Soviet Russia. In the 1990s, she advised the Russian and Ukrainian governments and from 1999 to 2003 she headed the International Economics Programme at Chatham House. Her books include ''Remembering Inflation'' (2013) and ''What Ails France?'' (2021). She writes regularly for Project Syndicate, The Conversation and ''The International Economy'' and has contributed to the Financial Times, Le Monde and Bloomberg News.

== Education ==
Granville earned a Maitrise en Sciences Economiques diploma (M.Econ. equivalent) in 1979 at the University of Burgundy in Dijon, France and an MPhil in development studies from the Institute of Development Studies at the University of Sussex in 1982. She received her PhD from the European University Institute in 1997.

== Career ==
Granville was a summer intern at the World Bank in 1982 and a stagiaire at the European Economic Commission from 1987 to 1988.

From 1992 to 1994, she was as a member of the Monetary and Financial Unit advising the Russian Ministry of Finance. As an analyst, she worked with the Central Bank of Russia and the banking system to produce a weekly "Monetary Report" on the main macroeconomic indicators and provided analytical support to policymakers on the 1993 Monetary reform in Russia and on the future of the ruble after the dissolution of the Soviet Union.

From 1994 to 1997, she was a senior expert at the Russian European Centre for Economic Policy, advising the Russian government and taught as an associate professor at the New Economic School in Moscow. She also advised the government of Ukraine in 1994 and 1995. Over the same period, she was a Senior Research Fellow in the International Economics Programme at Chatham House.

From September 1997 to June 1998, she was vice president for Russia at J. P. Morgan.

Granville worked in the Chatham House think tank, a non-profit, non-governmental organization based in London whose mission is to analyse and promote the understanding of major international issues and current affairs. She served as senior research fellow of the International Economics Programme from 1994 to 1997, and as head of the International Economics Programme from January 1999 to December 2003.

Granville joined Queen Mary University of London in 2004 and founded the Centre for Globalisation Research. From 2006, she led an Arts and Humanities Research Council project on the fair trade movement, which produced ''The Processes and Practices of Fair Trade'' (Routledge, 2013), co-edited with Janet Dine. Her monograph ''Remembering Inflation'' (Princeton University Press, 2013) examines earlier inflationary episodes and their lessons for monetary policy, with particular attention to fiscal and monetary interactions and central bank credibility.

=== Awards ===
In 2007, Granville was appointed a chevalier in the Ordre des Palmes Académiques, a decoration awarded by the French government for services to education.

=== Charity ===
Granville is a trustee of Effective Intervention, a UK-registered non-governmental organization involved in research-focused projects on infant mortality and primary education in some of the poorest regions of India, Guinea-Bissau and Gambia.

== Publications ==
=== Books ===
- Granville, Brigitte (2021). What ails France, McGill-Queen’s University Press, ISBN 9780228006800
- Granville, Brigitte (2013). Remembering inflation. Princeton, N.J: Princeton University Press. ISBN 9780691145402.
- Granville, Brigitte (2013). The processes and practices of fair trade : trust, ethics and governance. New York: Routledge. ISBN 978-0-415-57566-9.
- Attaran, Amir; Granville, Brigitte (2004). Delivering essential medicines. London Washington, DC: Chatham House Distributed worldwide by Brookings Institution. ISBN 1862031509.
- Aggarwal, Vinod; Granville, Brigitte (2003). Sovereign debt : origins, crises and restructuring. London Washington, D.C: Royal Institute of International Affairs, International Economics Programme Distributed by the Brookings Institution. ISBN 1862031460.
- Granville, Brigitte (2002). The economics of essential medicines. London Washington, DC: Royal Institute of International Affairs Distributed worldwide by the Brookings Institution. ISBN 1862031436.
- Granville, Brigitte (2001). Russia's post-communist economy. Oxford New York: Oxford University Press. ISBN 0-19-829526-X.
- Granville, Brigitte (2000). Essays on the world economy and its financial system. London UK Washington, DC: Royal Institute of International Affairs, International Economics Programme Distributed worldwide by the Brookings Institution (1775 Mass. Ave., NW, 20036. ISBN 1862031045.
- Granville, Brigitte (1995). The success of Russian economic reforms. London: Royal Institute of International Affairs, International Economics Programme. ISBN 1899658068.

=== Selected essays and articles ===
- Decoding Central Bank Communications with Large Language Models, (with Kairan Chen and Roman Matousek), Journal of International Financial Markets, Institutions and Money, 109, 2026: 102325, 10.1016/j.intfin.2026.102325
- Macron and the Economy: A Labour-Market Perspective, (with Federica Liberini), Revolution Revisited: Emmanuel Macron and the Limits of Political Change in France. S. Collard. London & New York, Taylor and Francis, 2025: 175-179.
- Communities of Grievance: Comparative evidence from the Yellow Vests Movement in France, Towards a very British Version of the "Culture Wars"A.-P. Bonnet and R. Kilty. London and New York, Taylor and Francis, 2024: 58-79.
- Does greater Financial Openness promote external competitiveness in emerging markets? The role of institutional quality, (with Zunaira Aman, Sushanta Mallick and, Ilayda Nemlioglu), International Journal of Finance and Economics, 29(1), 2024: 486-510, September. https://doi.org/10.1002/ijfe.2695
- Factor prices and induced technical change in the Industrial Revolution, (with Ravshonbek Otojanov and Roger Fouquet), The Economic History Review, 76(2), 2023: 599-623, May. https://doi.org/10.1111/ehr.13194
- Choosing the Optimal Tool for Fiscal Adjustment or Living under Fiscal Constraints: Panel Evidence from Selected OECD Countries (with Cagri Esener and Roman Matousek), Economic Research Guardian, Weissberg Publishing, 12(1), 2022: 2-29, June. https://ideas.repec.org/a/wei/journl/v12y2022i1p2-29.html
- Time variation in inflation persistence: new evidence from modelling US Inflation (with Ning Zeng), Economic Modelling, Volume 81, September 2019: 30-39, https://doi.org/10.1016/j.econmod.2018.12.004
- The euro is doomed, Inference, Volume 4, Issue 3, March 2019 In response to “One Euro, One Europe” (Vol. 4, No. 2). https://inference-review.com.
- Withdrawal of Italy from the euro area: stochastic simulations of a structural macroeconometric model (with Alberto Bagnai and Christian A. Mongeau Ospina), Economic Modelling, 2017. 64: 524-538. https://doi.org/10.1016/j.econmod.2017.04.010
- Eurozone cycles: an analysis of phase synchronization, (with Sana Hussain), International Journal of Finance and Economics, 2017. 22: 83-114. https://doi.org/10.1002/ijfe.1576
- Conflicting incentives for the public to support the EMU, (with Dominik Nagly), The Manchester School, 2015: 142-157. Doi: 10.1111/manc.12108.
