= Jozef Konings =

Belgian economist

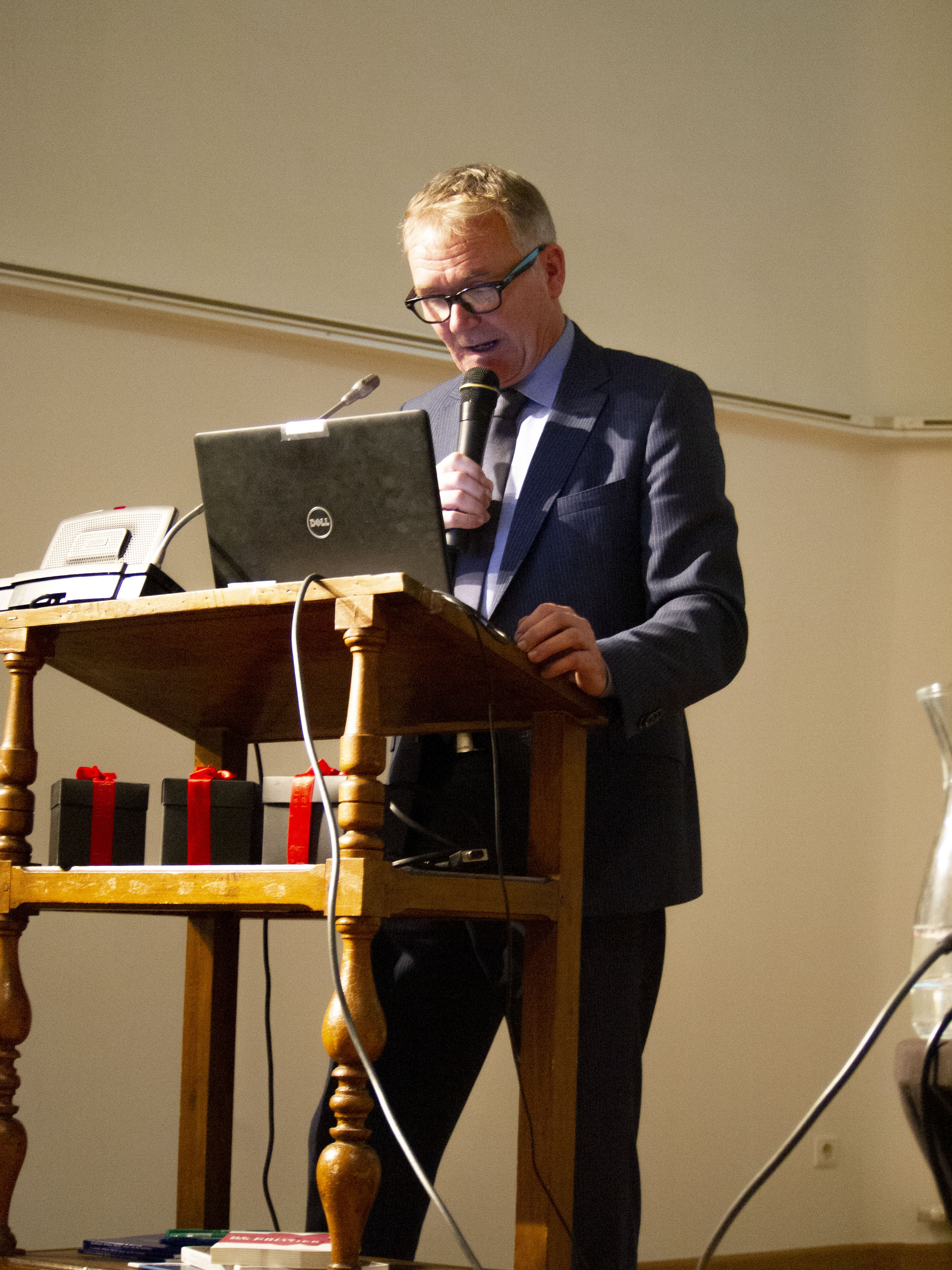
- Born: 24 May 1967 (age 59); Antwerp, Belgium
- Education: University of Antwerp, London School of Economics
- Spouse: Malika Turkmenova
- Children: 2
- Scientific career
- Fields: International macroeconomics, Globalization, Emerging Markets
- Workplaces: KU Leuven, University of Liverpool, Nazarbayev University
- Thesis: Gross job flows and wage determination in the U.K.: Evidence from firm level data (1994)
- Website: www.jozefkonings.com

Jozef "Joep" Konings (Dutch pronunciation: [ˈjoːzəf jup ˈkoːnɪŋs]; born 24 May 1967) is a Belgian economist and Professor in Economics at KU Leuven. He is director of research and full professor at the Nazarbayev University Graduate School of Business in Kazakhstan (strategic partner with the Fuqua School of Business at Duke University) NUGSB, director of the Flemish Institute for Economics and Science (VIVES) at KU Leuven and research fellow of the Center for Economic Policy Research (CEPR) in London. He is a former advisor in economics for the Barroso cabinet in the European Commission, in the Bureau of European Policy Advisers (BEPA).

== Education and career ==
Joep Konings did his undergraduate degree at the Jezuit University of Antwerp (UFSIA) where he graduated in 1989. He continued with a Master of Science and a PhD in Economics at the London School of Economics. His PhD dealt with analyzing job creation and destruction dynamics using micro data under supervision of Chris Pissarides, who got the Nobel prize in economics in 2010. Christopher Pissarides. His thesis was titled Gross job flows and wage determination in the U.K.: Evidence from firm level data.

In 1997 he became an associate professor at KU Leuven and director of the Leuven Institute of Central and Eastern European Studies, LICOS. In 2004 he became Dean of the Faculty of Economics and Business of KU Leuven. In that capacity, he was one of the founders of research institute VIVES in 2008.

In 2008, Joep Konings stepped out of the academic world to strengthen the European Commission's Office of European Policy Advisors (BEPA), as an economics adviser in the cabinet of European President J.M. Barosso. He returned to KU Leuven in 2010, stating that he is primarily a researcher and that this is his preferred position from which to weigh in on policy.

In 2010 he became director of VIVES, KU Leuven, a research center that researches the socio-economic development of regions, with a focus on Flanders. Konings also has extensive international experience as a visiting fellow at the Federal Reserve Bank in New York, IZA; Institute of Labor Economics, Bonn; Ljubljana University; Nazarbayev University in Astana Kazakhstan; Dartmouth College, USA; Trinity College in Dublin and the IMF.

In 2021 he took up a position as director of research at the Graduate School of Business at Nazarbayev University in Kazakhstan, which has strategic partner Fuqua School of Business at Duke University)Nazarbayev University in Astana Kazakhstan]

== Ideology ==
Joep Konings is regularly contributing to the economic debates and shaping opinion about economic policy. He could be seen as a neo-Keynesian economist, as reflected in his publications. He received a prestigious Flemish Methusalem grant for his research on the "granularity of the economy", which is about better understanding the impact of economic shocks such as the 2009 crisis, making use of big data. He regularly publishes policy pieces focusing on measures that policy makers can make. He is known as one of the academics that advised government to do a so-called 'index jump' in Belgium to absorb the economic crisis of 2009, temporarily stalling the automatic wage indexation in 2015. As director of the Flemish Policy Research Centre 'Economics and Entrepreneurship' (Steunpunt Economie en Ondernemen), he and his team also carry out targeted research on the effects of policy measures.
