= Torben Grodal =

Torben Grodal is an author and professor emeritus of Film and Media studies at the University of Copenhagen in Denmark. Grodal was born on 25 January 1943 in Holbæk, Denmark.

== Career ==
Grodal studied literature at the University of Copenhagen in Denmark. He was hired as an assistant professor in the Literature Department after he finished his studies. For many years he was a professor of literature at the University of Copenhagen. Grodal became a professor of Film and Media studies after this new department was created at the University of Copenhagen. In 2013 Torben Grodal retired and became a professor emeritus.

Grodal has written numerous academic essays about film analysis including his breakthrough work, Moving Pictures - A New Theory of Film Genres, Feelings, and Cognition published by the Oxford University Press in 1997. In Moving Pictures Grodal provides a theoretical account of the role of emotions and cognition in producing the aesthetics effects of film and television genres. Over the course of several articles Grodal has developed a model for how humans process film called the PECMA flow - short for "Perception, Emotion, Cognition and Motor Action". In his more expansive book on the topic "Embodied Vision: Evolution, Emotion, Culture and Film" published in 2009 by Oxford University Press, Grodal elaborates on the PECMA flow model and how evolutionary approaches to film analysis are flexible enough to take into account cultural variations in perceptions of film.
