= Seung Joo Lee =

South Korean physicist, educator and military scientist

- Education: Seoul National University; State University of New York at Buffalo
- Occupation: Physicist

Korean name
- Hangul: 이승주
- Hanja: 李承柱
- RR: I Seungju
- MR: I Sŭngju

Seung Joo Lee is a South Korean physicist, educator and military scientist. He received his B.S. (1974) and M.S. (1977) from Seoul National University, and PhD in 1981 from the State University of New York at Buffalo and since became a Fellow of the Korean Physical Society and a Member of the American Physical Society. In 2010 he became a life Fellow of the American Physical Society.

He had post-doctoral experience in Princeton University in 1985-1986 and visiting professorships at the University of Würzburg and Max Planck Institute Stuttgart, and University at Buffalo SUNY. In 1999 he became the Vice President of the Korean Physical Society and Chief Editor of J. of KPS and New Physics journals. Since 2001 he has been a professor at QSRC Dongguk University following his appointment at the Korea Military Academy where he was Professor and Dean of Academic Board, Brigadier General. He has been also a member of the Commission of the Semiconductors IUPAP (2005–2011) and vice chairman of the Commission of the Semiconductors IUPAP (2011-2014).

His research interests include electrical and magnetic properties of low-dimensional electron gases, spintronics based on diluted magnetic semiconductors and multiferroic/ferroelectric semiconductors. Throughout his career Dr Lee has received numerous commendations, citations, and the Order of Merit (Suk-Ryu-Jang, Cheun-Su-Jang) from the office of the President of South Korea and from the South Korean Ministry of National Defense.
