= Daniel Treisman =

British-American political scientist

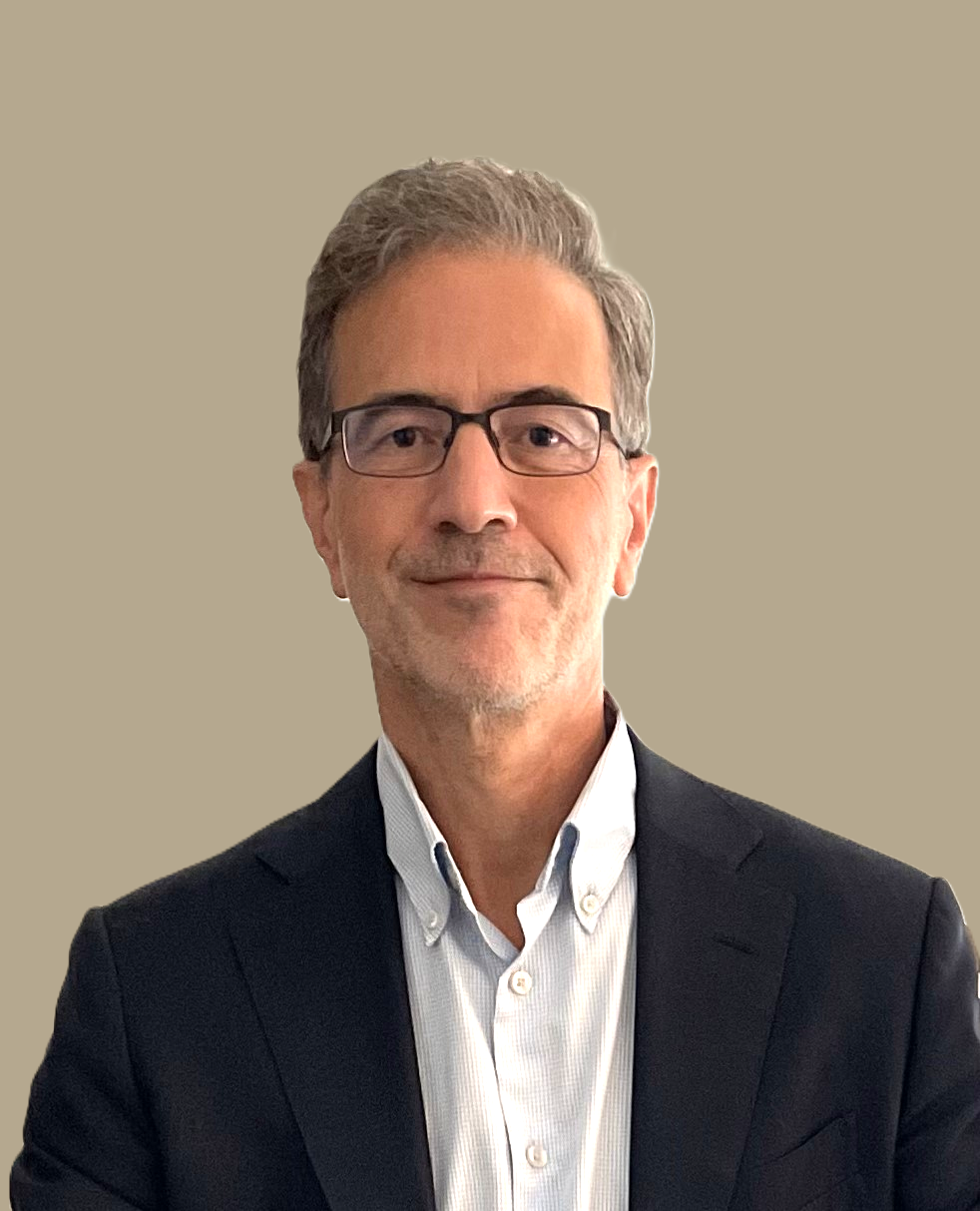
- Treisman in 2024
- Born: November 19, 1964 (age 61); Oxford, UK
- Citizenship: American, British

Academic background
- Education: Oxford University (BA), Harvard University (Ph.D)

Academic work
- Discipline: Political economy, comparative politics
- Institutions: University of California, Los Angeles

Daniel S. Treisman is a British-American political scientist. He is a professor at the University of California, Los Angeles, and has served as the interim director of UCLA's Center for European and Russian Studies. He is also a research associate at the National Bureau of Economic Research.

Treisman has published books and journal articles on Russian politics and economics, authoritarianism, democratization, political decentralization, and corruption. He also writes regularly for news outlets and current events publications such as Foreign Affairs, Foreign Policy, The Washington Post, and CNN. From 2007–10, Treisman was the acting lead editor and then co-editor of the American Political Science Review. He has spent years as a visiting fellow at the Center for Advanced Study in the Behavioral Sciences and the Hoover Institution at Stanford University, and at the Institut für die Wissenschaften vom Menschen (Institute for Human Sciences) in Vienna.

== Personal background ==
Treisman was born in Oxford, England, in 1964 but moved to North America at age 13. He attended Prince of Wales Secondary School in Vancouver, British Columbia, before studying for a B.A. in Politics, Philosophy, and Economics at Oxford and a Ph.D. in Political Science at Harvard. His mother, Anne Treisman, and father, Michel Treisman, were experimental psychologists, while his stepfather was the Nobel Prize-winning social psychologist and pioneer of behavioral economics Daniel Kahneman. Treisman’s older sister, Jessica, is a professor of cell biology at New York University, and his younger sister, Deborah, is the fiction editor of the New Yorker. He is married to a graphic designer, Susan Landesmann, and has two daughters, Alexandra and Lara.

== Academic career ==
=== Post-Soviet Russia ===
In his Ph.D. dissertation, published as the book After the Deluge: Regional Crises and Political Consolidation in Russia in 1999, Treisman traced the rise and fall of regional protests and separatism in Russia in the 1990s and argued that the stabilization after 1994 owed much to a Kremlin policy of "selective fiscal appeasement," which bought off the most mobilized regions with fiscal transfers to prevent a bandwagon of revolt from forming.

In subsequent works, he has argued against a view of Russia as unique and constrained to an authoritarian path by its history and culture. In "A normal country," co-authored with the Harvard economist Andrei Shleifer, Treisman contended that by the early 2000s Russia had evolved from a collapsing communist state into a "normal, middle-income capitalist economy" which held "generally free—if flawed—elections." While distinctive in its large nuclear arsenal and "pivotal role in international affairs," Russia mostly resembled other middle-income countries such as Mexico or Malaysia, which confronted a similar set of problems—widespread corruption, politicized judges, a constrained media, income inequality, and economic crises. Although an average middle-income country was "not a secure or socially just place to live," the authors rejected extreme characterizations of the country at that time.

The article aroused some controversy, with certain critics arguing that the country was far from normal. One response pointed to Russians’ low and declining life expectancy, while another suggested that the appropriate comparison group was not all middle-income countries but just the relatively successful post-communist states of Central Europe (the Czech Republic, Slovakia, Hungary, and Poland).

In the mid-2010s, Treisman recruited a team of mostly Russian scholars and journalists to investigate political decision making under Putin. This resulted in a volume, edited by Treisman, titled The New Autocracy: Information, Politics, and Policy in Putin’s Russia. In the introduction, Treisman argued that Putin’s increasingly authoritarian approach since 2012 aimed to freeze or even reverse the rapid economic and social modernization of the previous decade, which—while boosting living standards—had also sparked protests against the regime. Kremlin political management alternated between two modes—"autopilot," in which outcomes were decided through vicious battles among elite factions, and "manual control," in which Putin intervened to dictate outcomes directly. The chapter noted "an apparent narrowing and deterioration in the quality of information the president receives."

In a chapter on the 2014 annexation of Crimea, Treisman characterized the decision to invade as hyper-centralized and impulsive, apparently influenced by fear of losing the Russian naval base in Sevastopol. He described a haphazard, rapidly improvised implementation, with no decision made beforehand about who the region’s new political leader would be. The Crimean episode suggested "an apparently growing affinity for Pyrrhic victories."

Treisman has characterized the early Putin as a classic "informational autocrat" or "spin dictator" (see below). He has described Putin since around 2018 as reverting to "fear dictatorship," based on overt repression.

In an article in 2007, Treisman coined the term "silovarch" to refer to an emerging set of Russian business magnates with backgrounds in the security services and personal ties to Putin. The word combines siloviki, a Russian name for law enforcement professionals, and oligarch, a term for politically influential businessmen.

=== Corruption ===
Treisman was one of the first scholars to use indexes of "perceived corruption" in the 1990s to explore variation in the quality of governments around the world. In a widely cited article, he found that higher economic development, British colonial heritage, Protestantism, and a long history of democracy correlated with cleaner government, while federal structure was associated with more corruption.

Treisman later became skeptical that such indexes, constructed from experts’ subjective ratings, were reliable measures of corruption rather than reflections of countries’ international reputations. Expert ratings, while correlating strongly with variables such as colonial heritage, religion, and even the proportion of women in government, often correlated weakly if at all with citizens’ responses in surveys about their direct experience of demands for bribes. Treisman suggested that experts might be using well-known or observable factors such as colonial heritage, religion, and gender balance to infer the level of corruption rather than those factors determining how much corruption existed.

=== Political decentralization ===
In a series of articles, many co-authored with the economist Hongbin Cai, Treisman explored the consequences of political and fiscal decentralization. He used formal models and empirical analysis to reexamine a number of common claims—investigating, for instance, whether political decentralization encourages local governments to improve performance in order to attract mobile capital, stimulates greater policy experimentation, weakens the central state, or increases inflation. Cai and Treisman also scrutinized claims that political decentralization was a major cause of China's rapid economic development, reaching a skeptical conclusion.

In The Architecture of Government (Cambridge University Press, 2007), Treisman addressed a series of classic arguments about decentralization, modeling their logic, and concluded that almost none were likely to hold in general. He argued that because multiple effects push in opposite directions, it is difficult to know when a particular decentralizing reform will be beneficial and when harmful. In his view: "no robust, general consequences of political decentralization have been—or are likely to be—identified."

=== Democracy and authoritarianism ===
Treisman has participated in debates over the role of economic development in supporting democracy. He has proposed a "conditional modernization theory," in which economic development creates a potential for stable democracy, but the exact timing of transitions depends on contingent events and decisions of leaders. In one 2015 article, he showed that higher national income is associated with transitions to democracy, but only in the medium run. A change of the top leader is often necessary to trigger reform, and leader turnover occurs only periodically. He illustrated with the example of Spain, where GDP per capita increased for decades without causing any observable softening of the dictatorship of Francisco Franco. Shortly after the dictator died in 1975, however, the country jumped to a much higher level of democracy.

Arguing against theories that explain the introduction of democracy as a rational choice by incumbent autocrats, Treisman contends that such transitions more often result from the dictator’s errors. Examining 316 historical episodes of democratization, he found that the details of these were consistent with deliberate choice by the leader in about one third of cases. In more than two thirds, some significant blunder contributed. Common errors, according to Treisman, included underestimating the strength of opposition and failing to react, overestimating the leader’s own popularity and calling elections only to lose them, starting unsuccessful wars, and sliding down the "slippery slope" of self-weakening concessions.

In other work, Treisman has expressed skepticism about the extent of "democratic recession" in the 2010s and 2020s. In a 2023 article, he pointed out that most indicators suggested at most a modest decline in the global share of democracies. (Some others have countered that the decline looks more significant if countries are weighted by population rather than treated as equal.) Treisman's statistical estimations implied that what backsliding had occurred since 2000 could be explained by the relatively poor and democratically inexperienced character of most countries that became democratic in the "Third Wave" between 1974 and 2005.

In 2022, together with the Russian economist Sergei Guriev, Treisman published Spin Dictators: The Changing Face of Tyranny in the 21st Century (Princeton University Press, 2022). The book, which expanded on several journal articles, explored how authoritarian governments had been changing in previous decades. Fewer dictators were using overt violent repression to intimidate the public and more were, instead, faking democracy and manipulating media to persuade citizens that they were effective and benevolent leaders. The authors characterize this as a shift in the global balance away from "fear dictatorship" to "spin dictatorship," also termed "informational autocracy." The book won several prizes and has been translated into 13 languages, including French, Russian, Spanish, and Japanese.

== Awards ==
- Elected to the American Academy of Arts and Sciences, 2023.
- Prix Guido et Maruccia Zerilli-Marimo de l’Académie des Sciences Morales et Politiques, Paris, 2023, for Spin Dictators.
- Arthur Ross Book Prize Bronze Medal, 2023, for Spin Dictators.
- Andrew Carnegie Fellowship, 2022–4.
- John Simon Guggenheim Memorial Foundation Fellowship, 2002–3.

== Selected publications ==
- Guriev, S., & Treisman, D. (2022). Spin dictators The changing face of tyranny in the 21st century. Princeton University Press.
- Treisman, D. (Ed.). (2018). The new autocracy: Information, politics, and policy in Putin’s Russia. Brookings Institution Press.
- Treisman, D. (2011). The return: Russia’s journey from Gorbachev to Medvedev. The Free Press.
- Treisman, D. (2007). The architecture of government: Rethinking political decentralization. Cambridge University Press.
- Shleifer, A., & Treisman, D. (2000). Without a map: Political tactics and economic reform in Russia. MIT Press.
- Treisman, D. (1999). After the deluge: Regional crises and political consolidation in Russia. University of Michigan Press.
- Treisman, D. (2020). Democracy by mistake: How the errors of autocrats trigger transitions to democracy. American Political Science Review, 114(3), 792-810.
- Treisman, D. (2020). Economic development and democracy: Predispositions and triggers. Annual Review of Political Science, 23, 241-257.
- Guriev, S., & Treisman, D. (2019). Informational autocrats. Journal of Economic Perspectives, 33(4), 100-127.
- Gimpelson, V., & Treisman, D. (2018). Misperceiving inequality. Economics and Politics, 30(1), 27-54.
- Blom-Hansen, J., Houlberg, K., Serritzlew, S., & Treisman, D. (2016). Jurisdiction size and local government policy expenditure: Assessing the effect of municipal amalgamation. American Political Science Review, 110(4), 812-831.
- Treisman, D. (2015). Income, democracy, and leader turnover. American Journal of Political Science, 59(4), 927-942.
- Treisman, D. (2011). Presidential popularity in a hybrid regime: Russia under Yeltsin and Putin. American Journal of Political Science, 55(3), 590-609.
- Treisman, D. (2010). ‘Loans for shares’ revisited. Post-Soviet Affairs, 26(3), 207-227.
- Cai, H., & Treisman, D. (2009). Political decentralization and policy experimentation. Quarterly Journal of Political Science, 4(1), 35-58.
- Fan, C. S., Lin, C., & Treisman, D. (2009). Political decentralization and corruption: Evidence from around the world. Journal of Public Economics, 93(1-2), 14-34.
- Treisman, D. (2007). Putin’s silovarchs. Orbis, 51(1), 141-153.
- Treisman, D. (2007). What have we learned about the causes of corruption from ten years of cross-national empirical research? Annual Review of Political Science, 10, 211-244.
- Cai, H., & Treisman, D. (2006). Did government decentralization cause China’s economic miracle? World Politics, 58(4), 505-535.
- Cai, H., & Treisman, D. (2005). Does competition for capital discipline governments? Decentralization, globalization, and public policy. American Economic Review, 95(3), 817-830.
- Shleifer, A., & Treisman, D. (2005). A normal country: Russia after communism. Journal of Economic Perspectives, 19(1), 151-174. (Shorter version published in Foreign Affairs, March–April 2004.)
- Treisman, D. (2004). Rational appeasement. International Organization, 58(2), 345-373.
- Cai, H., & Treisman, D. (2004). State corroding federalism. Journal of Public Economics, 88(3-4), 819-843.
- Treisman, D. (2000). Decentralization and inflation: Commitment, collective action, or continuity? American Political Science Review, 94(4), 837-857.
- Treisman, D. (2000). The causes of corruption: A cross-national study. Journal of Public Economics, 76(3), 399-457.
