= Mikhail Golosov =

Belarusian-American economist

- Born: Vitebsk, Byelorussian SSR, Soviet Union

Academic background
- Education: Belarus State Economic University (BA) University of British Columbia (MA) University of Minnesota (PhD)
- Doctoral advisor: V. V. Chari; Larry Eugene Jones
- Website: Information at IDEAS / RePEc

Mikhail Golosov (Russian: Михаил Голосов) is a Belarusian-American economist currently the Homer J. Livingston Professor of Economics at the University of Chicago and a Fellow of the Econometric Society. He previously served as Chemical Bank Chairman's Professor of Economics at Princeton University.

Education

Golosov earned a bachelor's degree in economics and banking from Belarus State Economic University in 1998. After graduation, he completed his master's degree in University of British Columbia in 1999. Finally, he was able to get a Doctor of Philosophy in economics from University of Minnesota in 2004.

Teaching experiences

Golosov was an Assistant Professor with the title of Dornbusch Career Development Associate Professor at MIT from 2004 to 2009. He was a professor at Yale University from 2009 to 2011. He was a professor with the title of Chemical Bank Chairman's Professor of Economics at Princeton University from 2011 to 2017. Finally, he is continuing the Homer J. Livingston Professor of Economics at the University of Chicago as stated above. Also, he had a lot of experiences as a visiting professor at Kellogg School of Management and Harvard University.
