= Belarus State Economic University =

University in Minsk, Belarus

Coordinates: 53°52′41″N 27°36′26″E

Belarusian State Economic University
- Беларускі дзяржаўны эканамічны ўніверсітэт
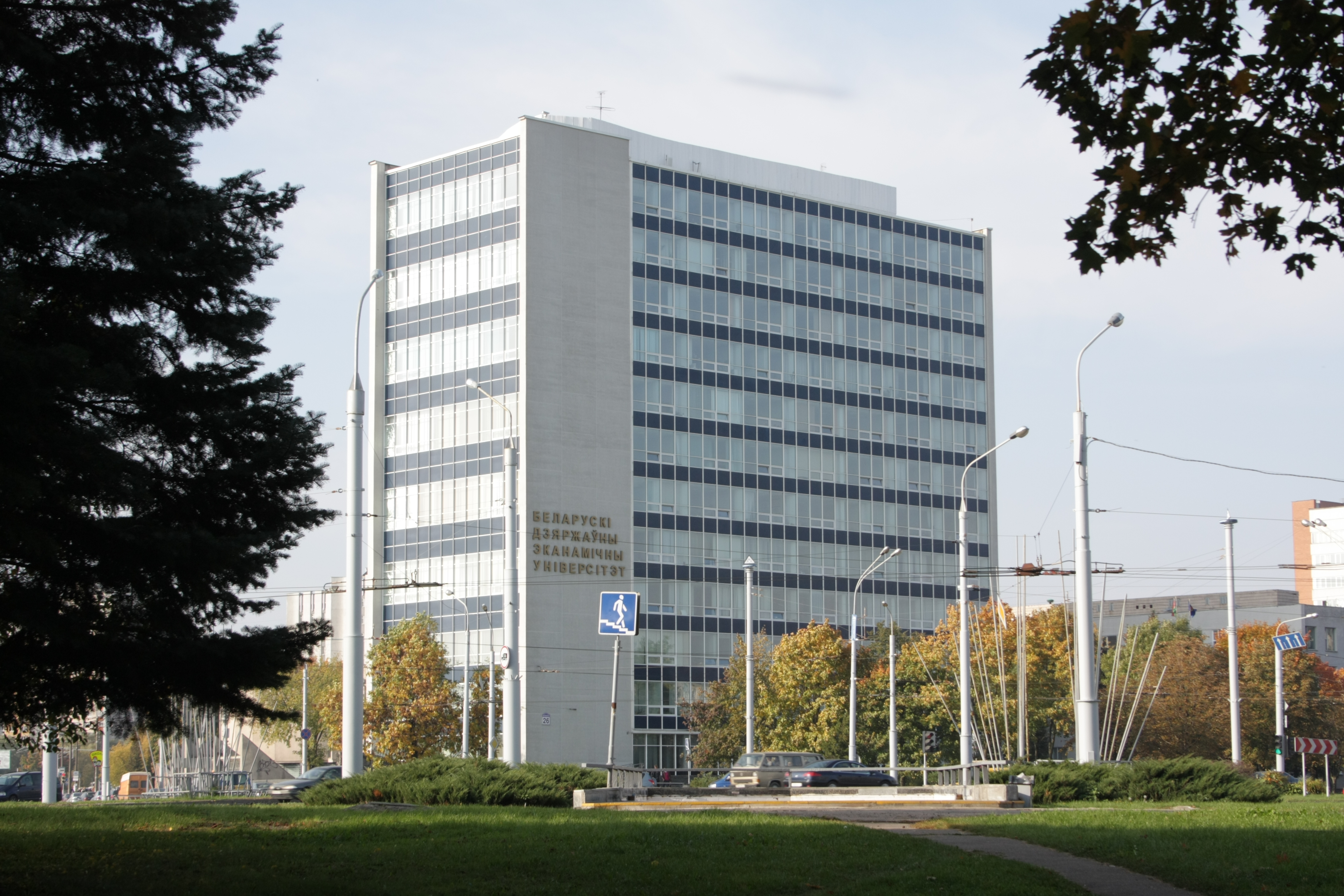
- Type: Public
- Established: May 20, 1933
- Rector: Aleksei Yegorov
- Students: 13,000
- Location: Partizansky Ave 26, Minsk, 220070, Belarus
- Website: www.bseu.by/

Belarus State Economic University (Belarusian: Беларускі дзяржаўны эканамічны ўніверсітэт) is a university in Minsk, Belarus. It specializes in Finance and Economics. It was founded in 1933 as Belarusian Institute for National Economy. It was renamed Belarus State Economic University (BSEU) in January 1992. In 1997, the university was officially given the status of a leading educational institution in preparing specialists in the field of economics.

The University is a member of international organizations and associations. Today, BSEU has signed about 130 agreements and cooperation contracts with higher education institutions, research and educational organizations from 23 countries in the near and far abroad. BSEU is one of the first higher education institutions in Belarus to be certified according to the international quality management system STB ISO 9001-2009. Students from more than 27 countries study at BSEU. BSEU has double-diploma programs with universities of Russia and China.

== History ==
BSEU is one of the oldest universities in the country. The growing need of the state for educated specialists was reflected in the resolution of the November 1929 Plenum of the Central Committee of the All-Union Communist Party of Bolsheviks «On the Personnel of the National Economy». It stated the need to improve the training of economists of various profiles. Already in 1930 an independent Faculty of National Economy was established with five departments: industrial, agricultural, planning and statistical, financial and co-operative. At that time the faculty had 300 students, and in 1931 there were more than 700 students.

On the basis of the Faculty of Social Sciences of the BSU, three independent institutes were established in accordance with the Resolution of the Supreme Soviet of the Belarusian Soviet Socialist Republic (BSSR) No. 215 of 7 July 1931: the Institute of Planning and Economics, the Institute of Finance and Economics, and the Institute of Consumer Cooperation (Cooperative Institute) of different administrative subordination. These institutes existed for about two years. However, there was a lack of experienced economic personnel, as specialists were scattered throughout the country (from Brest to Kamchatka and the Far East).

On the basis of the decision of the Council of People's Commissars of the BSSR No. 721 of 20 May 1933, the Belarusian State Institute of National Economy (BSINE) was established on the basis of the three above-mentioned institutes. It and its working faculty were approved by Gosplan of the BSSR in the autumn of the same year. On 20 January 1935, the government of the BSSR gave the institute the name of Kuibyshev.

On 22 June 1941 the Second World War began and BSINE stopped its work.

Former directors of BSINE P.A.Balabanov, A.V.Gurlo, I.L.Satsunkevich, professor N.V.Dembinsky, associate professors S.V.Elison, T.A.Zarubin, I.F.Kruk, A.I.Petukhov and other teachers and graduates of the institute fought in the ranks of the Red Army, in partisan detachments and underground groups. Many employees of the «Narkhoz» made their contribution to the approaching hour of liberation of the Motherland. In July 1944 the capital of Soviet Belarus was liberated from the Nazi invaders. During the Second World War the educational buildings of the Institute were destroyed, their contents were mostly destroyed. On 28 October 1944, in accordance with the decree of the Council of People's Commissars, the institute resumed its activity. The first post-war admission committee of BSINE started its work on 25 January 1945. In February the first post-war enrolment of 58 students took place. Regular classes began on 1 March 1945 in the evening shift in the building of the secondary school.

The first post-war educational building was opened between 1950 and 1954

On 20 January 1992, the V.V. Kuibyshev Belarusian State Institute of National Economy was transformed into the Belarusian State University of Economics by the Resolution of the Council of Ministers of the Republic of Belarus No. 21.

The Belarusian State University received state certification and accreditation for the first time in 1995. It confirmed its status as the leading educational institution in the national system of training economic personnel in 1996.

== Modern period ==
Today the Belarusian State University of Economics is the country's leading higher education institution of economic profile. The University uses its potential, based on the best national and international experience, to meet the intellectual, cultural and social needs and interests of the Belarusian society and the state, and contributes to the sustainable development of Belarus.

The University offers a wide range of specialties in economics, management, law and communications through the following educational programs:

- secondary specialized education in 5 specialties (Novogrudok College of Commerce and Economics);
- general higher education in 22 specialties and in 27 specialties of higher education, I stage;
- advanced higher education (Master Studies) in 10 specialties including programs in English;
- postgraduate education in 15 specialties (post-graduate students are trained in 15 specialties, doctoral students in 6 specialties);
- training and retraining the managerial staff and Management, Finance, Economics and Law university graduates in 10 specialties;
- advanced training in 5 specialties.

The University is included in the list of educational institutions on which basis the experimental and innovative activities are taking place. Such specialties of general higher education as «World Economics», «Marketing» and «Accounting, Analysis and Audit» are realized in English.

BSEU uses the latest technologies in education including distance educational programs, project-based method and digital technologies. The educational projects «University 3.0» and «Digital University» are aimed at revealing, individual abilities of a student and his personality, selection of disciplines and transition to individual study periods for individual courses, creative self-realization of students, development of critical thinking and creative abilities.

There are about 60 doctors, professors and 400 candidates of sciences, associate professors whose scientific papers and textbooks are used in educational programs in Belarus and other countries.

In order to develop proposals on improving the scientific and methodological support for economic education and training specialists in Bachelor and Master Programs as well as additional adult education The Educational and Methodological Association in Economic Education and The Educational and Methodological Association in the field of additional adult education are functioning.

== Scientific and pedagogical schools ==
- Scientific and Pedagogical School of National Economy
- Scientific and Pedagogical School of Economics and Management at the Enterprise
- Scientific and Pedagogical School of Marketing
- Scientific and Pedagogical School of Production Management
- Scientific and Pedagogical School of Finance
- Scientific and Pedagogical School of Economics and Management in Trade
- Scientific and Pedagogical School of Accounting, Analysis of Economic Activity, Control, Revision and Audit
- Scientific and Pedagogical School of Statistics
- Scientific and Pedagogical School of Mathematical Methods of Economics
- Scientific and Pedagogical School of World Economy

== Editions ==
- Scientific and practical edition «Bulletin of the Belarusian State Economic University»
- Scientific and practical publication «Belarusian Economic Journal»
- The newspaper «Economist»
- Collection «Scientific Works of BSEU»
- Collection of scientific articles of students «NIRS BSEU»

== Structure ==
=== Faculties ===
- Faculty of Marketing and Logistics
- Faculty of Management
- Faculty of International Economic Relations
- Faculty of Law
- Faculty of Accounting and Economics
- Faculty of Finance and Banking
- Faculty of International Business Communication
- Graduate School of Management and Business
- Faculty of Commerce and Tourism Industry
- Faculty of Digital Economy

=== Centres ===
- Centre for pre-university training and vocational guidance

=== Institutes ===
- Institute for Advanced Training and Retraining of Economic Personnel
- Institute of Social and Humanitarian Education

=== Colleges ===
- Novogrudok Trade and Economic College

== Rectors ==
- 1933-1935 - Alexey Gurlo
- 1935-1936 - Ivan Satsunkevich
- 1936-1937 - Aaron Shtarkman
- 1937-1938 - Nikolai Koziuk
- 1938-1939 - Gavriil Sugrobov
- 1939-1940 - Peter Balabanov
- 1940-1944 - Fedor Mikunov
- 1944-1949 - Efim Romanenko
- 1949-1962 - Gavriil Sugrobov
- 1962-1965 - Ivan Truhan
- 1966-1969 - Sergey Malinin
- 1969-1991 - Fedor Borovik
- 1991-2002 - Roman Karseko
- 2002 - 16 May 2019 - Vladimir Shimov
- 16 May 2019 - 2021 - Vyacheslav Shutilin
- Since 29 July 2021 - Aleksei Yegorov

== International cooperation ==
The university has close contacts with such international educational organizations as the US Embassy, International Research & Exchanges Board (IREX), British Council, German Academic Exchange Service (DAAD) and others.

== Ranking ==
According to the "UniPage world university ranking," the Belarus State Economic University is ranked 2228 in the world.

Active development in the world of university rankings began in the 2000s. The results of the teaching, research and international activities of the university staff ensured BSEU's presence in four rankings:

- WEB Ranking of Universities: Webometrics Ranking of World Universities
- Ranking Web of Repositories Ranking Web of Repositories
- Russian Science Citation Index (RSCI)
- UniRank World University Rankings (UniRank)

== Prominent alumni ==
The university's alumni include famous athletes, academics, scientists, government officials and businessmen.

=== Sports ===
Elena Altshul - five-time world champion in international draughts, four-time USSR champion in draughts;

Vladimir Romanovsky - honoured Master of Sports of the Republic of Belarus, Olympic champion in canoeing, 2-time world champion, European champion among juniors in 1975, champion of the VII Summer Spartakiade of the Peoples of the USSR in 1979;

Daria Domracheva - Belarusian biathlete, four-time Olympic champion, two-time world champion (2012 and 2013), winner of the World Cup 2014/15, winner of 6 Small Crystal Globes of the Biathlon World Cup, Honoured Master of Sports of the Republic of Belarus. The most titled athlete in the history of the Winter Olympic Games in biathlon, as well as the first biathlete in the world to win three individual races. On the day she won her third gold medal at the 2014 Games, Daria was awarded the title «Hero of Belarus», the first woman in the history of the country to be honoured with the highest award of the Republic of Belarus.

=== Government officials and politics ===
Nadezhda Ermakova - Honoured Economist of the Republic of Belarus. Honoured Worker of the Banking System of Belarus. Chairman of the Management Board of JSSB Belarusbank from 1996 to 2011, Chairman of the Management Board of the National Bank of the Republic of Belarus 2011-2014; from 2019-2021 - Chairman of the Board of Directors, Independent Director and Chairman of the Risk Committee of BSB Bank CJSC; from 2020-2021 - Chairman of the Management Board of Belgazprombank OJSC; from 2021 - Independent Director, member of the Supervisory Board of Belinvestbank, public figure;

Nikolay Korbut - from 1994 to 2001, Head of the Department for servicing the diplomatic corps and official delegations «Dipservice» of the Presidential Affairs Directorate; Manager of the Presidential Affairs Directorate (in 2009-2013); in 2014-2017, Chief Inspector for Minsk Region. - Chief Inspector for Minsk Region; 2017-2018. - Assistant to the President for General Affairs; since 2018, appointed Deputy Secretary of State - member of the Standing Committee of the Union State;

Andrey Tur - Doctor of Economics, Professor, since 1995 worked as Deputy Minister of Economy, in 2011-2013 - Deputy Head of the Administration of the President of the Republic of Belarus. He initiated the discussion and development of measures popular in the business community, which were later adopted by the government and enshrined in the Presidential Directive No. 4 «On the Development of Entrepreneurial Initiative and Stimulation of Business Activity in the Republic of Belarus».

=== Science ===
Mikhail Golosov - Homer J. Livingston professor of economics at the University of Chicago.

Aleh Tsyvinski - Arthur M. Okun professor of economics at Yale University.

Kiryl Rudy - belarusian statesman, diplomat, doctor of economic sciences, professor. Author of more than 200 publications in Belarus, Russia, Kazakhstan, Austria, Slovakia, USA, China;

Alexander Durovich - scientist-marketer, practising consultant, Doctor of Economics, associate professor. Author of more than 220 scientific and scientific-methodical works, including: monographs and textbooks with the Ministry of Education of the Republic of Belarus;

Peter Nikitenko - scientist-economist, political economist, noospherologist (philosopher), Doctor of Economic Sciences, Professor, Corresponding Member, Academician of the National Academy of Sciences of Belarus. Founder and head of the International Innovation and Noosphere Scientific School on Sustainable Development of Belarus. Author of more than 600 scientific works, including 33 monographs, textbooks, manuals, textbooks, etc. He is the author of more than 600 scientific works. Honoured Scientist of Belarus, twice nominated for the V. A. Koptyug Prize (Russia). A. Koptug (Russia) on sustainable development.

== Awards ==
By the Decree of the Presidium of the Supreme Soviet of the Union of Soviet Socialist Republics of 28.04.1983 the Belarusian State Institute of National Economy named after V.V. Kuibyshev was awarded the Order of the Red Banner of Labour for services in training qualified specialists of national economy and development of scientific research. Kuibyshev was awarded the Order of the Red Banner of Labour.

For many years of fruitful activity in training highly qualified specialists and scientific personnel, special achievements in social and cultural development and in connection with the 75th anniversary of its establishment, the Decree of the President of the Republic of Belarus No. 274 of 15.05.2008 awarded the institution of education «Belarusian State University of Economics» the Honourable State Flag of the Republic of Belarus.

== Campus ==
The University Campus is a peculiar structural complex including 9 hostels with assigned territory, buildings and a staff of qualified employees.

Sporting, cultural and leisure activities are organized on campus, covering all areas of activity and varying in terms of their organization and methods of implementation: creative competitions, thematic evenings and conferences, talk shows, multimedia presentations, meetings with social, political, educational, scientific and cultural personalities, excursions, etc. Clubs of all kinds, sports clubs and sections are active throughout the year.

The dormitories have gyms, tennis rooms, fitness rooms, conference and recreation rooms, rooms for self-study and student self-governance. There are 31 sports sections for 8 kinds of sports - athleticism, physical fitness, grace, mini-football, yoga, billiards, table tennis, darts. All buildings have self-service laundries equipped with washing machines, drying and ironing rooms.

== Criticism, accusations of political repressions ==
In late 2005, Tatsiana Khoma, a fourth-year A-student of the International Economic Relations Faculty, was expelled from the BSEU after participating in a conference of ESIB, a pan-European student organization, where she was elected member of the organization's leadership. The expulsion caused wide international protest and concerns from Sweden's education minister Leif Pagrotsky. The European University Association has frozen its cooperation with the BSEU following the scandal. BSEU students close to Tatsiana Khoma and those involved in civic activities were intimidated by the university's administration and the KGB.

In 2006, after mass protests against president Lukashenka that followed a controversial presidential election, BSEU students that were identified among protesters were forced, under threat of expulsion, to publicly repent and denounce the protests.

In 2008, human rights organisations have added BSEU rector Uladzimir Shymau (Vladimir Shimov) to a list of officials of the regime of president Alexander Lukashenko responsible for human rights violations. Shymau was listed among rectors of several universities from where students were expelled on political grounds.

In 2020, during the mass protests that followed another presidential election, the administration of the BSEU has reportedly filed a list of the university's students who participated in the protests to the police and requested measures to be taken against them. Several students were expelled from BSEU for participating in protests. The dean of one of the faculties was fired for expressing his political opinion and protecting student protesters.

On 21 June 2021, Siarhei Skryba, Vice Chancellor of the BSEU for Educational Work, was added to the sanctions list of the European Union. According to the official decision of the EU, "in his position as Vice Chancellor of the Belarusian State Economic University (BSEU) for educational work, Siarhei Skryba is responsible for sanctions taken against students for their participation in peaceful protests, including their expulsion from university. Some of these sanctions were taken following Lukashenka's call on 27 October 2020 for expelling from universities students taking part in protests and strikes."
