= Aleh Tsyvinski =

Belarusian-American economist

- Born: November 17, 1977 (age 48)

Academic background
- Education: Belarus State Economic University (BA) University of Minnesota (MA, PhD)

Academic work
- Discipline: Macroeconomics, Public economics, Optimal fiscal policy, Effects of taxation, Role of the government, Macroeconomic policy
- Institutions: Yale University
- Website: Information at IDEAS / RePEc

Aleh Tsyvinski (Belarusian: Алег Цывінскі; Russian: Олег Цывинский) is a Belarusian-American economist who is currently the Arthur M. Okun Professor of Economics at Yale University. He is a Fellow of Econometric Society, a Fellow of Society for Advancement of Economic Theory (SAET), and a recipient of John Simon Guggenheim Memorial Foundation Award, Alfred P. Sloan Research Fellowship and National Science Foundation CAREER Grant.
