= History of human migration =

Human migration is the movement by people from one place to another, particularly different countries, with the intention of settling temporarily or permanently in the new location. It typically involves movements over long distances and from one country or region to another. The number of people involved in every wave of immigration differs depending on the specific circumstances.

Historically, early human migration includes the peopling of the world, i.e. migration to world regions where there was previously no human habitation, during the Upper Paleolithic. Since the Neolithic, most migrations (except for the peopling of remote regions such as the Arctic or the Pacific), were predominantly warlike, consisting of conquest or Landnahme on the part of expanding populations. Colonialism involves expansion of sedentary populations into previously only sparsely settled territories or territories with no permanent settlements. In the modern period, human migration has primarily taken the form of migration within and between existing sovereign states, either controlled (legal immigration) or uncontrolled and in violation of immigration laws (illegal immigration).

Migration can be voluntary or involuntary. Involuntary migration includes forced displacement (in various forms such as deportation, the slave trade, flight (war refugees and ethnic cleansing), all of which could result in the creation of diasporas.

== Pre-modern history ==
Studies show that the pre-modern migration of human populations begins with the movement of Homo erectus out of Africa across Eurasia about 1.75 million years ago. Homo sapiens appeared to have occupied all of Africa about 150,000 years ago; some members of this species moved out of Africa 70,000 years ago (or, according to more recent studies, as early as 125,000 years ago into Asia, and even as early as 270,000 years ago). It is suggested that modern non-African populations descend mostly from a later migration out of Africa between 70,000 and 50,000 years ago, which spread across Australia, Asia and Europe by 40,000 BCE. Migration to the Americas took place 20,000 to 15,000 years ago. West-Eurasian back-migrations into Africa happened between 30,000 to 15,000 years ago, as well as pre-Neolithic and Neolithic back-migrations, followed by the Arab expansion in medieval times.

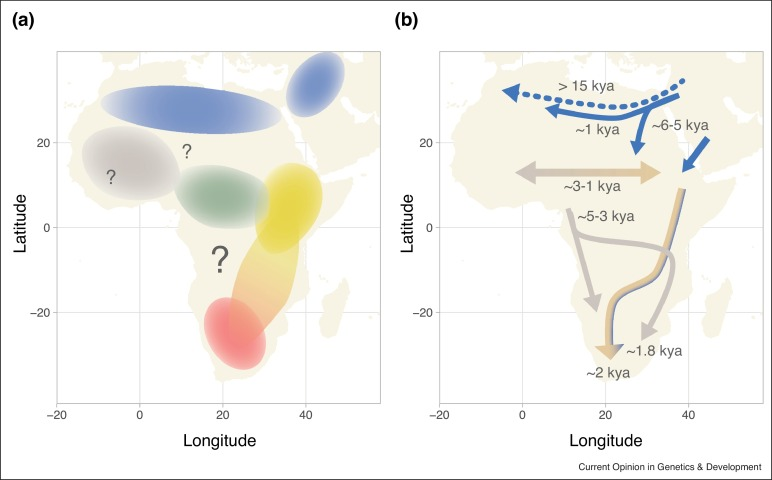
Pre-Neolithic and Neolithic migration events in Africa.

By 2000 years ago humans had established settlements in most of the Pacific Islands. Major population-movements notably include those postulated as associated with the Neolithic Revolution and with Indo-European expansion. The Early Medieval Great Migrations including Turkic expansion have left significant traces. In some places, such as Turkey and Azerbaijan, there was a substantial cultural transformation after the migration of relatively small elite populations. Historians see elite-migration parallels in the Roman and Norman conquests of Britain, while "the most hotly debated of all the British cultural transitions is the role of migration in the relatively sudden and drastic change from Romano-Britain to Anglo-Saxon Britain", which may be explained by a possible "substantial migration of Anglo-Saxon Y chromosomes into England (contributing 50–100% to the gene pool at that time)."

Chronological dispersal of Austronesian people across the Indo-Pacific

Early humans migrated due to many factors, such as changing climate and landscape and inadequate food-supply for the levels of population. The evidence indicates that the ancestors of the Austronesian peoples spread from the South Chinese mainland to the island of Taiwan around 8,000 years ago. Evidence from historical linguistics suggests that seafaring peoples migrated from Taiwan, perhaps in distinct waves separated by millennia, to the entire region encompassed by the Austronesian languages. Scholars believe that this migration began around 6,000 years ago. Indo-Aryan migration from the Indus Valley to the plain of the River Ganges in Northern India is presumed to have taken place in the Middle to Late Bronze Age, contemporary with the Late Harappan phase in India (around 1700 to 1300 BCE). From 180 BCE a series of invasions from Central Asia followed in the northwestern Indian subcontinent, including those led by the Indo-Greeks, Indo-Scythians, Indo-Parthians and Kushans.

From 728 BCE, the Greeks began 250 years of expansion, settling colonies in several places, including Sicily and Marseille. Classical-era Europe provides evidence of two major migration movements: the Celtic peoples in the first millennium BCE, and the later Migration Period of the first millennium CE from the North and East. A smaller migration (or sub-migration) involved the Magyars moving into Pannonia (modern-day Hungary) in the 9th century CE. Turkic peoples spread from their homeland in modern Turkestan across most of Central Asia into Europe and the Middle East between the 6th and 11th centuries CE. Recent research suggests that Madagascar was uninhabited until Austronesian seafarers from present-day Indonesia arrived during the 5th and 6th centuries CE. Subsequent migrations both from the Pacific and from Africa further consolidated this original mixture, and Malagasy people emerged.

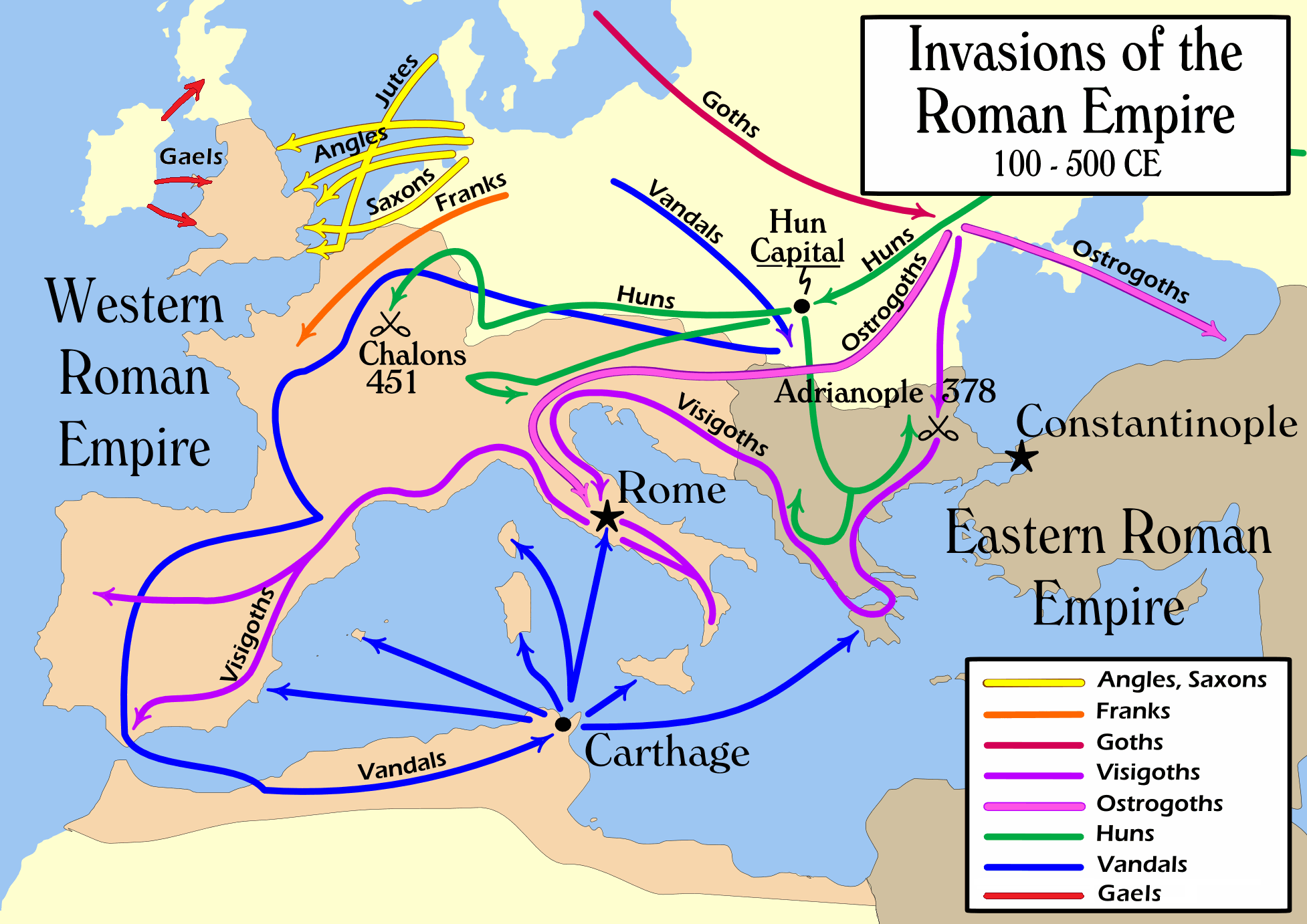
4th to 6th century Migration Period

Before the expansion of the Bantu languages and their speakers, the southern half of Africa is believed to have been populated by Pygmies and Khoisan-speaking people, whose descendants today occupy the arid regions around the Kalahari Desert and the forests of Central Africa. By about 1000 CE Bantu migration had reached modern-day Zimbabwe and South Africa. The Banu Hilal and Banu Ma'qil, a collection of Arab Bedouin tribes from the Arabian Peninsula, migrated westwards via Egypt between the 11th and 13th centuries. Their migration strongly contributed to the Arabisation and Islamisation of the western Maghreb, until then dominated by Berber tribes. Ostsiedlung was the medieval eastward migration and settlement of Germans – following in the footsteps of East Germanic Goths and North Germanic Varangians. The 13th century was the time of the great Mongol and Turkic migrations across Eurasia, where the Eurasian steppe has time and again provided a ready migration-path – for (for example) Huns, Bulgars, Tatars and Slavs.

Between the 11th and 18th centuries, numerous migrations took place in Asia. The Vatsayan Priests migrated from the eastern Himalaya hills to Kashmir during the Shan invasion in the 13th century. They settled in the lower Shivalik Hills in the 13th century to sanctify the manifest goddess. In the Ming occupation, the Vietnamese started expanding southward in the 11th century; this is known in Vietnamese as nam tiến (southward expansion). The early Qing dynasty (1644-1912) separated Manchuria from China proper with the Inner Willow Palisade, which restricted the movement of the Han Chinese into Manchuria, as the area was off-limits to the Han until the Qing started colonizing the area with them (late 18th century) later on in the dynasty's rule.

The Age of Exploration and European colonialism has led to an accelerated pace of migration since Early Modern times. In the 16th century, perhaps 240,000 Europeans entered American ports. In the 19th century over 50 million people left Europe for the Americas alone. The local populations or tribes, such as the Aboriginal people in Canada, Brazil, Argentina, Australia, and the United States, were often numerically overwhelmed by incoming settlers and by those settlers' indentured laborers and imported slaves.

== Modern history ==
=== Industrialization ===
When the pace of migration had accelerated since the 18th century already (including the involuntary slave trade), it would increase further in the 19th century. Manning distinguishes three major types of migration: labor migration, refugee migrations, and urbanization. Millions of agricultural workers left the countryside and moved to the cities causing unprecedented levels of urbanization. This phenomenon began in Britain in the late 18th century and spread around the world and continues to this day in many areas.

Industrialization encouraged migration wherever it appeared. The increasingly global economy globalized the labor market. The Atlantic slave trade diminished sharply after 1820, which gave rise to self-bound contract labor migration from Europe and Asia to plantations. Overcrowding, open agricultural frontiers, and rising industrial centers attracted voluntary migrants. Moreover, migration was significantly made easier by improved transportation techniques.

Romantic nationalism also rose in the 19th century, and, with it, ethnocentrism. The great European industrial empires also rose. Both factors contributed to migration, as some countries favored their own ethnicity over outsiders and other countries appeared to be considerably more welcoming. For example, the Russian Empire identified with Eastern Orthodoxy, and confined Jews, who were not Eastern Orthodox, to the Pale of Settlement and imposed restrictions. Violence was also a problem. The United States was promoted as a better location, a "golden land" where Jews could live more openly. Another effect of imperialism, colonialism, led to the migration of some colonizing parties from "home countries" to "the colonies", and eventually the migration of people from "colonies" to "home countries".

Transnational labor migration reached a peak of three million migrants per year in the early twentieth century. Italy, Norway, Ireland and the Guangdong region of China were regions with especially high emigration rates during these years. These large migration flows influenced the process of nation state formation in many ways. Immigration restrictions have been developed, as well as diaspora cultures and myths that reflect the importance of migration to the foundation of certain nations, like the American melting pot. The transnational labor migration fell to a lower level from the 1930s to the 1960s and then rebounded.

The United States experienced considerable internal migration related to industrialization, including its African American population. From 1910 to 1970, approximately 7 million African Americans migrated from the rural Southern United States, where black people faced both poor economic opportunities and considerable political and social prejudice, to the industrial cities of the Northeast, Midwest and West, where relatively well-paid jobs were available. This phenomenon came to be known in the United States as its own Great Migration, although historians today consider the migration to have two distinct phases. The term "Great Migration", without a qualifier, is now most often used to refer the first phase, which ended roughly at the time of the Great Depression. The second phase, lasting roughly from the start of U.S. involvement in World War II to 1970, is now called the Second Great Migration. With the demise of legalised segregation in the 1960s and greatly improved economic opportunities in the South in the subsequent decades, millions of blacks have returned to the South from other parts of the country since 1980 in what has been called the New Great Migration.

=== World wars and aftermath ===
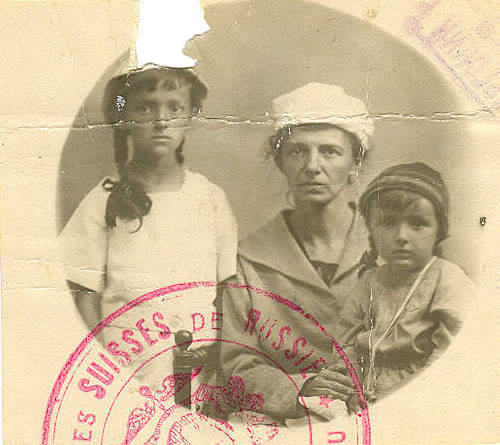
Swiss woman and her children leaving Civil war in Russia, around 1921

The First and Second World Wars, and wars, genocides, and crises sparked by them, had an enormous impact on migration. Muslims moved from the Balkan to Turkey, while Christians moved the other way, during the collapse of the Ottoman Empire. I Four hundred thousand Jews had already moved to Palestine in the early twentieth century, and numerous Jews to America, as already mentioned. The Russian Civil War caused some three million Russians, Poles, and Germans to migrate out of the new Soviet Union. Decolonization following the Second World War also caused migrations.

The Jewish communities across Europe, the Mediterranean and the Middle East were formed from voluntary and involuntary migrants. After the Holocaust (1938 to 1945), there was increased migration to the British Mandate of Palestine, which became the modern state of Israel as a result of the United Nations Partition Plan for Palestine.

Provisions of the Potsdam Agreement from 1945 signed by victorious Western Allies and the Soviet Union led to one of the largest European migrations, and the largest in the 20th century. It involved the migration and resettlement of close to or over 20 million people. The largest affected group were 16.5 million Germans expelled from Eastern Europe westwards. The second largest group were Poles, millions of whom were expelled westwards from eastern Kresy region and resettled in the so-called Recovered Territories (see Allies decide Polish border in the article on the Oder-Neisse line). Hundreds of thousands of Poles, Ukrainians (Operation Vistula), Lithuanians, Latvians, Estonians and some Belarusians were expelled eastwards from Europe to the Soviet Union. Finally, many of the several hundred thousand Jews remaining in Eastern Europe after the Holocaust migrated outside Europe to Israel and the United States.

==== Post-colonial and labor migrations in Western Europe ====
Driven by labor demands and decolonization processes, the United Kingdom, France, the Netherlands, and Germany saw an influx of migrants from former colonies and other regions, which reshaped Europe's demographic and cultural landscapes.

The Netherlands witnessed the arrival of approximately 300,000 'repatriates' from the former Dutch East Indies (now Indonesia) between 1949 and 1950, which led to tensions between native Dutch citizens and Indo-Dutch newcomers. The subsequent decades saw labor migration from Morocco and Turkey. Similarly in Germany, the Wirtschaftswunder (economic miracle) inspired recruitment of 'temporary laborers,' many of whom settled permanently in Europe, prompting debates about integration and national identity.

France's post-colonial migration involved significant numbers of individuals from North and Sub-Saharan Africa, especially Algeria, Morocco, and Senegal. The complexities of French citizenship laws and the legacy of colonialism influenced the integration experiences of these migrants.

==== Partition of India ====
In 1947, upon the Partition of India, large populations moved from India to Pakistan and vice versa, depending on their religious beliefs. The partition was created by the Indian Independence Act 1947 as a result of the dissolution of the British Indian Empire. The partition displaced up to 17 million people in the former British Indian Empire, with estimates of loss of life varying from several hundred thousand to a million. Muslim residents of the former British India migrated to Pakistan (including East Pakistan, now Bangladesh), whilst Hindu and Sikh residents of Pakistan and Hindu residents of East Pakistan (now Bangladesh) moved in the opposite direction.

In modern India, estimates based on industry sectors mainly employing migrants suggest that there are around 100 million circular migrants in India. Caste, social networks and historical precedents play a powerful role in shaping patterns of migration.

Research by the Overseas Development Institute identifies a rapid movement of labor from slower- to faster-growing parts of the economy. Migrants can often find themselves excluded by urban housing policies, and migrant support initiatives are needed to give workers improved access to market information, certification of identity, housing and education.

In the riots which preceded the partition in the Punjab region, between 200,000 and 500,000 people were killed in the retributive genocide. U.N.H.C.R. estimates 14 million Hindus, Sikhs and Muslims were displaced during the partition. Scholars call it the largest mass migration in human history: Nigel Smith, in his book Pakistan: History, Culture, and Government, calls it "history's greatest migration."

== See also ==
- Early human migrations
- Human migration
- Integration of immigrants
- Immigration § History
- Refugee crisis
- Timeline of maritime migration and exploration

== Notes and references ==
- Mayo-Smith, Richmond; Ingram, Thomas; Gadow, Hans (1911). "Migration" . In Chisholm, Hugh (ed.). Encyclopædia Britannica. Vol. 18 (11th ed.). Cambridge University Press. pp. 427–437.

== Bibliography ==
=== Literature ===
Books

- Bauder, Harald. Labor Movement: How Migration Regulates Labor Markets, New York: Oxford University Press, 2006.
- Behdad, Ali. A Forgetful Nation: On Immigration and Cultural Identity in the United States, Duke UP, 2005.
- Chaichian, Mohammad. Empires and Walls: Globalization, Migration, and Colonial Control, Leiden: Brill, 2014.
- Jared Diamond, Guns, germs and steel. A short history of everybody for the last 13'000 years, 1997.
- De La Torre, Miguel A., Trails of Terror: Testimonies on the Current Immigration Debate, Orbis Books, 2009.
- Fell, Peter and Hayes, Debra. What are they doing here? A critical guide to asylum and immigration, Birmingham (UK): Venture Press, 2007.
- Hoerder, Dirk. Cultures in Contact. World Migrations in the Second Millennium, Duke University Press, 2002
- Kleiner-Liebau, Désirée. Migration and the Construction of National Identity in Spain, Madrid / Frankfurt, Iberoamericana / Vervuert, Ediciones de Iberoamericana, 2009. ISBN 978-8484894766.
- Knörr, Jacqueline. Women and Migration. Anthropological Perspectives, Frankfurt & New York: Campus Verlag & St. Martin's Press, 2000.
- Knörr, Jacqueline. Childhood and Migration. From Experience to Agency, Bielefeld: Transcript, 2005.
- Manning, Patrick. Migration in World History, New York and London: Routledge, 2005.
- Migration for Employment, Paris: OECD Publications, 2004.
- OECD International Migration Outlook 2007, Paris: OECD Publications, 2007.
- Pécoud, Antoine and Paul de Guchteneire (Eds): Migration without Borders, Essays on the Free Movement of People (Berghahn Books, 2007)
- Abdelmalek Sayad. The Suffering of the Immigrant, Preface by Pierre Bourdieu, Polity Press, 2004.
- Stalker, Peter. No-Nonsense Guide to International Migration, New Internationalist, second edition, 2008.
- The Philosophy of Evolution (A.K. Purohit, ed.), Yash Publishing House, Bikaner, 2010. ISBN 8186882359.

Journals

- International Migration Review
- Migration Letters
- International Migration
- Journal of Ethnic and Migration Studies
- Review of Economics of the Household

Online Books

- OECD International Migration Outlook 2007 (subscription service)

=== Documentary films ===
- The Short Life of José Antonio Gutierrez
- El Inmigrante, Directors: David Eckenrode, John Sheedy, John Eckenrode. 2005. 90 min. (U.S./Mexico)
