= Junsen Zhang =

Junsen Zhang (Chinese: 张俊森) is an economist and Wei Lun Professor of Economics at the Chinese University of Hong Kong, where he also chairs the Department of Economics. He is a Fellow of the Econometric Society.

== Biography ==
Junsen Zhang earned a B.Sc. in engineering from Zhejiang University in 1983 and an M.A. and Ph.D. in economics from McMaster University in 1986 and 1990, respectively. From 1989 to 1990, he was a lecturer of econometrics at the Australian National University. Following his graduation, Zhang worked as an assistant professor in the Department of Economics of University of Western Ontario from 1990 to 1993. In 1993, Zhang returned to Hong Kong. Since then, Zhang has worked at the Chinese University of Hong Kong (CUHK) for 26 years. In 1995, Zhang became an associate professor of economics. In 2004, he became chair professor in the Department of Economics and associate dean (research) in the Faculty of Social Science at CUHK. In 2010, Zhang became Wei Lun Professor of Economics. Thereafter, he held the position of the department head of Economics at CUHK since 2012.

Zhang had been the president of the Hong Kong Economic Association from 2007 to 2011. In addition, Zhang has performed editorial duties for academic journals. He has been the co-editor of the Journal of Population Economics since 2001 and Journal of Human Resources since February 2019. In 2013, he was elected as a Fellow of the Econometric Society. In 2017, Junsen Zhang and his coauthor, Mark Rosenzweig, received the Sun Yefang Award Economic Science Award, one of the highest honors in the field of economics in China, for their article Do Population Control Policies Induce More Human Capital Investment? Twins, Birth Weight and China's "One-Child" Policy.

== Research ==
Junsen Zhang works in the fields of labor economics and development economics and is a top scholar on the Chinese economy. His research covers a broad range of topics, including marriage, crime, fertility, savings, education, health, and old-age support. He has published over 100 research articles in international academic journals, including four publications in the Journal of Political Economy and one in the Review of Economic Studies. According to a ranking by RePEc dated May 2018, Junsen Zhang ranks as the number one economist in the field of the Chinese economy.

=== Marriage Market ===
Junsen Zhang advances Gary Becker's theory of marriage with applications to China's marriage market. Junsen Zhang (1994) suggests that bequest to and marriage of children can lead to a Pareto inefficient allocation. He proves that the assortative mating in bequests can improve or even restore the market's efficiency. Junsen Zhang and William Chan (1999) reject Gary Becker's conjecture that dowry and bride price are two sides of the coin and serve to clear the marriage market and provide an alternative analysis. Although Becker's interpretation is retained for bride prices, a dowry is taken as a premortem bequest by altruistic parents for a daughter. Consistent with their theory, they find that a dowry improves the bride's welfare, but a bride price has no effect. Junsen Zhang and Pak-Wai Liu (2003) provide the first empirical evidence on Becker's prediction of the negative assortative mating on spouses' wages.

Junsen Zhang also inspects the marriage market in great details using Chinese data. In a joint work with Chong Huang, Hongbin Li, and Pak-Wai Liu, Junsen Zhang finds that a husband's education not only increases his earnings but also the earnings of his wife. Lena Edlund, Hongbin Li, Junjian Yi, and Junsen Zhang (2013) show that China's sex ratio imbalance incentivizes Chinese men to engage in crime. The association between sex ratio and crime is driven by the adverse marriage market conditions faced by Chinese men. Yoram Weiss, Junjian Yi, and Junsen Zhang (2018) find that the inflow of women from mainland China to Hong Kong benefits Hong Kong men from the low tail of the attribute distribution. The inflow of mainland women also worsens Hong Kong women's position in the marriage market and thus incentivizes Hong Kong women to work more and for longer hours. In a recent work with David Ong and Yu Yang, Junsen Zhang shows that the sex ratio imbalance in China mainly affects high-income women and lessens their chances of getting married.

=== Fertility and China's Population Control Policy ===
In the early 1990s, Junsen Zhang pioneered the use of micro data in the examination of the determinants of Chinese fertility and compliance with China's "one-child" policy. Hongbin Li and Junsen Zhang (2007) show that the one-child policy reduces birth rate and thus has a short-run positive effect on China's economic growth. However, the one-child policy has resulted in an aging population in the long run and slow down China's growth.

One line of Junsen Zhang's research examines the effect of population control policy on human capital investment. Mark Rosenzweig and Junsen Zhang (2009) find that the one-child policy has a positive effect on human capital investment via the quantity–quality tradeoff of children, but the effect is at best modest. They also criticize the negligence of intra-household allocation when using twin births to obtain variations in family size. Xuebo Wang and Junsen Zhang (2018) go beyond the quantity–quality tradeoff. They show that the one-child policy reduces the size of the more educated urban population relative to the size of the less educated rural population and thus induces a change in population composition that lowers China's average human capital investment. In a recent work with Junjian Yi and Rufei Guo, Junsen Zhang offers a theory of rationed fertility in which an undesired fertility reduction is less likely to increase a child's human capital investment compared with a desired one. Their findings imply that if promoting human capital investment is one of the main objectives of population control, then "voluntary" population control methods are preferred than "mandatory" policy instruments. Junsen Zhang (2017) traces the origin of China's one-child policy and is among the first to show that the one-child policy increases divorce and rural migration.

=== Family Resource Allocation ===
Resource allocation within a household is central to the understanding of human behavior and the effectiveness of public policies. Yuk-fai Fong and Junsen Zhang (2001) prove that Pierre-André Chiappori's collective model of household decision making can be extended to allow the identification of independent and spousal leisure. Hongbin Li, Mark Rosenzweig, and Junsen Zhang (2010) explore the roles of altruism, favoritism, and guilt in family resource allocation. They find that a twin who was sent down to the countryside during China's cultural revolution, in comparison with his or her co-twin who stayed in the cities, received a larger amount of wedding gifts from the parents. They are the first to pin down the existence of "guilt" that can enforce commitment in social contracts. Together with Junjian Yi, James Heckman, and Gabriella Conti, Junsen Zhang shows that parents respond to a child's health shock with compensatory investment in health and reinforcing investment in education. Overall, the family acts as a net equalizer in response to early health shocks across children.

The support for the elderly is at the heart of family resource allocation that Junsen Zhang has contributed in a series of studies. In two joint works with Kazuo Nishimura, Junsen Zhang shows that the social security program undermines Pareto efficiency of an economy as long as parents can determine their fertility. Together with Jie Zhang and Ronald Lee, Junsen Zhang shows that rising longevity increases investment in human capital and physical capital and thus tends to reduce fertility and raises economic growth. Mark Rosenzweig and Junsen Zhang (2014) find that the prevalence of intergenerational co-residence in China raises the young's savings rate. Their findings suggest that intergenerational co-residence in urban China represents a subsidy to the young by the old, rather than a support from the young to the old. Soo Hong Chew, Junjian Yi, Junsen Zhang, and Songfa Zhong (2017) find that more-risk-averse parents have a stronger preference for sons and the births of sons reduce parents' revealed risk aversion by insuring the parents for their old age. In a recent work with Rufei Guo, Junsen Zhang extends and tests Gary Becker's insight that parents seek old-age support from children via the inculcation of filial piety in children.

=== China's Economy ===
Junsen Zhang is one of the most prominent economists in the study of the Chinese economy. As previously mentioned, Junsen Zhang is among the first to analyze marriage, fertility, and intra-household allocation using Chinese data. Besides those well-known studies, Junsen Zhang's research on the returns to education in China has attracted wide interests from scholars and policy makers. Tianyou Li and Junsen Zhang (1998) find that education does not increase labor productivity under China's collective farming system, but the productivity returns to education are positive under the household farming system. Junsen Zhang, Yaohui Zhao, Albert Park, and Xiaoqing Song (2005) estimate the returns to schooling in urban China using a micro sample of China's urban household survey. Together with Hongbin Li, Pak-Wai Liu, and Linda Yung, Junsen Zhang is the first to collect and use a sample of twins in China to identify the returns to education using the within-twin method.

Junsen Zhang's research in the Chinese economy spans a large range of topics. In a joint work with Hongbin Li, Pak-Wai Liu, and Ning Ma, Junsen Zhang uses the Chinese twin data to show that members of the communist party have higher endowments compared with non-members. Mark Rosenzweig and Junsen Zhang (2013) explain the closing gender gap in education by the rising returns to skills and women's comparative advantage in brain-intensive tasks and use variations in the birth weights of Chinese twins to test their explanation. In two joint works with Jun Han, Runjuan Liu, and Beyza Ural Marchand, Junsen Zhang shows that although China's trade liberalization has increased wage inequality in urban China, it reduces consumer prices and thus raises the welfare of all Chinese households, especially that of the poor. In a recent work with Yi Fan and Junjian Yi, Junsen Zhang documents the rising intergenerational income persistence in China.
