= Pre-modern human migration =

Human movement over the earth

This article focusses on prehistorical migration since the Neolithic period until AD 1800. See Early human migrations for migration prior to the Neolithic, History of human migration for modern history, and human migration for contemporary migration.

Paleolithic migration prior to end of the Last Glacial Maximum spread anatomically modern humans throughout Afro-Eurasia and to the Americas. During the Holocene climatic optimum, formerly isolated populations began to move and merge, giving rise to the pre-modern distribution of the world's major language families.

In the wake of the population movements of the Mesolithic came the Neolithic Revolution, followed by the Indo-European expansion in Eurasia and the Bantu expansion in Africa.

Population movements of the proto-historical or early historical period include the Migration period, followed by (or connected to) the Slavic, Magyar, Norse, Turkic and Mongol expansions of the medieval period.

The last world regions to be permanently settled were the Pacific Islands and the Arctic, reached during the 1st millennium AD.

Since the beginning of the Age of Exploration and the beginning of the Early Modern period and its emerging colonial empires, an accelerated pace of migration on the intercontinental scale became possible.

== Prehistory ==
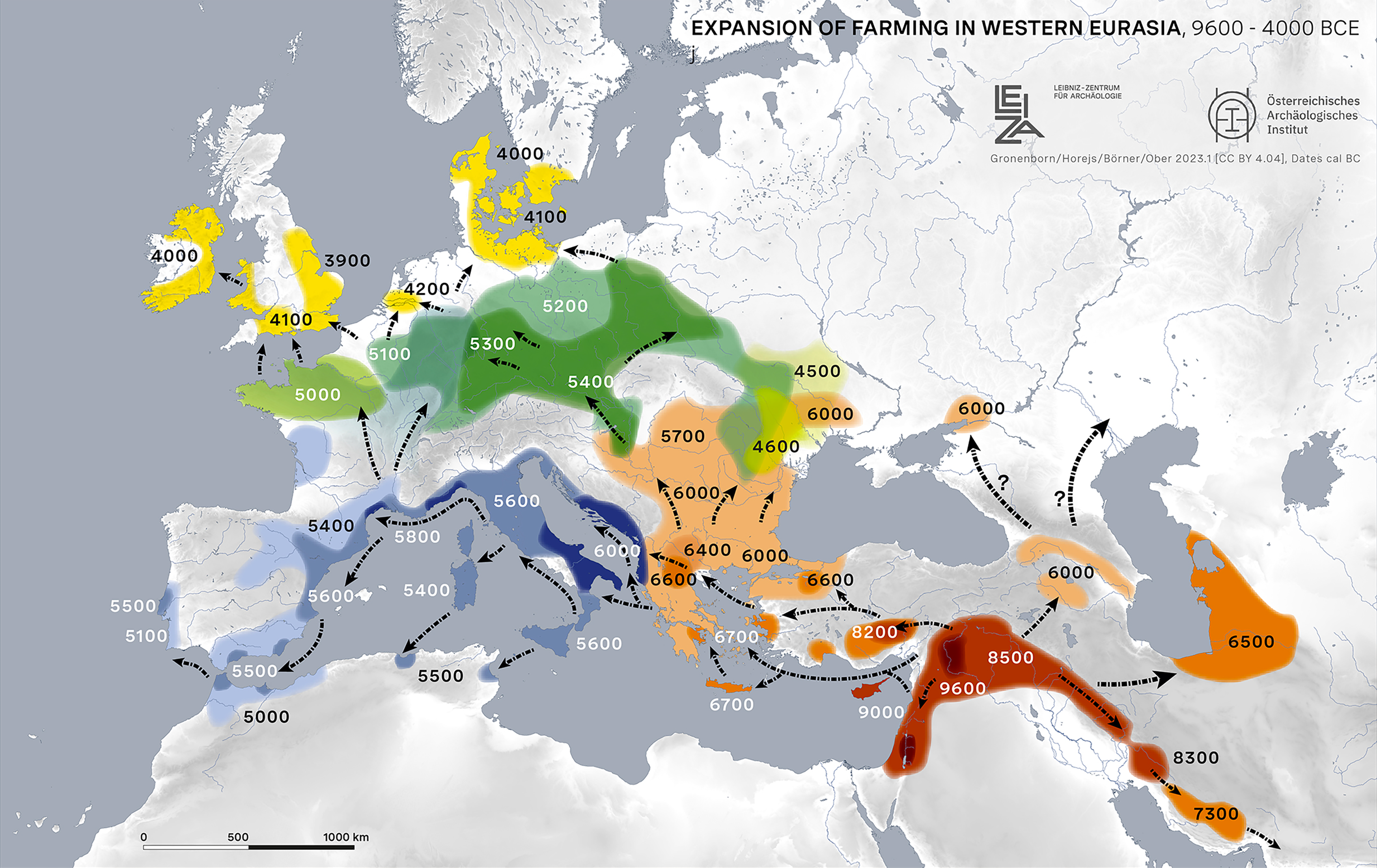
Recent advances in archaeogenetics have confirmed that the spread of agriculture from the Middle East to Europe was strongly correlated with the migration of early farmers from Anatolia about 9,000 years ago, and was not just a cultural exchange.

=== Neolithic to Chalcolithic ===
Agriculture is believed to have first been practised around 10,000 BC in the Fertile Crescent in places like Jericho. From there, it propagated as a "wave" across Europe, a view supported by Archaeogenetics, reaching northern Europe some 5 millennia ago. Millet was an early crop domesticated in Northern China 9,000 BC (11 kya).

The Neolithic farmers, called the Early European Farmers (EEF), migrated probably from Anatolia to the Balkans in large numbers during the 7th millennium BC and mixed at various frequencies with the earlier Mesolithic hunter-gatherer population.

During the Chalcolithic and early Bronze Age, the EEF-derived cultures of Europe were overwhelmed by successive invasions of Western Steppe Herders (WSHs) from the Pontic–Caspian steppe, who carried about 60% Eastern Hunter-Gatherer (EHG) and 40% Caucasus Hunter-Gatherer (CHG) admixture. These invasions led to EEF paternal DNA lineages in Europe being almost entirely replaced with EHG/WSH paternal DNA (mainly R1b and R1a). EEF maternal DNA (mainly haplogroup N) also declined, being supplanted by steppe lineages, suggesting the migrations involved both males and females from the steppe. EEF mtDNA however remained frequent, suggesting admixture between WSH males and EEF females.

Some evidence (including a 2016 study by Busby et al.) suggests admixture from an ancient migration from Eurasia into parts of Sub-Saharan Africa. Another study (Ramsay et al. 2018) also shows evidence that ancient Eurasians migrated into Africa and that Eurasian admixture in modern Sub-Saharan Africans ranges from 0% to 50%, varying by region and generally highest (after North Africa) in the Horn of Africa and parts of the Sahel zone.

=== Bronze Age ===
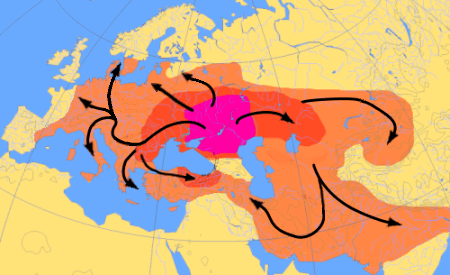
Scheme of Indo-European migrations from c. 4000 to 1000 BC according to the Kurgan hypothesis. The purple area corresponds to the assumed Urheimat (Samara culture, Sredny Stog culture). The red area corresponds to the area which may have been settled by Indo-European-speaking peoples up to c. 2500 BC; the orange area to 1000 BC.

The proposed Indo-European migration has variously been dated to the end of the Neolithic (Marija Gimbutas: Corded Ware culture, Yamna culture, Kurgan culture), the early Neolithic (Colin Renfrew: Starčevo-Körös, Linearbandkeramic) and the late Palaeolithic (Marcel Otte, Paleolithic continuity theory).

The speakers of the Proto-Indo-European language are usually believed to have originated to the North of the Black Sea (today Eastern Ukraine and Southern Russia), and from there they gradually migrated into, and spread their language by cultural diffusion to, Anatolia, Europe, and Central Asia Iran and South Asia starting from around the end of the Neolithic period (see Kurgan hypothesis). Other theories, such as that of Colin Renfrew, posit their development much earlier, in Anatolia, and claim that Indo-European languages and culture spread as a result of the agricultural revolution in the early Neolithic.

Relatively little is known about the inhabitants of pre-Indo-European "Old Europe". The Basque language remains from that era, as do the indigenous languages of the Caucasus. The Sami are genetically distinct among the peoples of Europe, but the Sami languages, as part of the Uralic languages, spread into Europe about the same time as the Indo-European languages. However, since that period speakers of other Uralic languages such as the Finns and the Estonians have had more contact with other Europeans, thus today sharing more genes with them than the Sami. Like other Western Uralic and Baltic Finnic peoples, the Finns originate from the Volga region in what is now Russia. Their ancestors migrated to Finland in the 8th century BC.

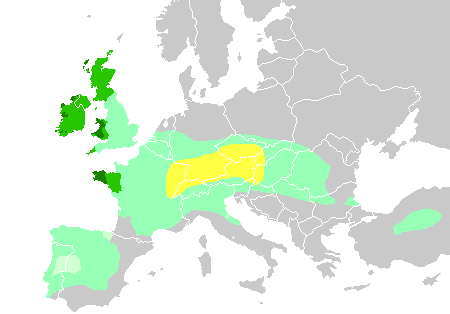
Celtic expansion in Europe, 6th–3rd century BC

The earliest migrations we can reconstruct from historical sources are those of the 2nd millennium BC. The Proto-Indo-Iranians began their expansion from c. 2000 BC, the Rigveda documenting the presence of early Indo-Aryans in the Punjab from the late 2nd millennium BC, and Iranian tribes being attested in Assyrian sources as in the Iranian plateau from the 9th century BC. In the Late Bronze Age, the Aegean and Anatolia were overrun by moving populations, summarized as the "Sea Peoples", leading to the collapse of the Hittite Empire and ushering in the Iron Age.

A major archaeogenetics study uncovered a migration into southern Britain in the Bronze Age, during the 500-year period 1,300–800 BC. The newcomers were genetically most similar to ancient individuals from Gaul.

=== Austronesian expansion ===
Map showing the Austronesian expansion, the prehistoric maritime migration of the Austronesians using ancient sailing technology

The Austronesian expansion is a large-scale prehistoric seaborne migration of Austronesians from Taiwan into the Indo-Pacific using ancient sailing technologies; largely into previously uninhabited islands in Island Southeast Asia, Micronesia, Island Melanesia, Polynesia, and Madagascar. This started at around 3000 to 1500 BCE, though smaller migration waves continued up to historical times, ending at around AD 1200 with the settlement of Rapa Nui and New Zealand.

Austronesians first sailed southward and settled in northern Luzon, in the archipelago of the Philippines, intermingling with the earlier Australo-Melanesian population who had inhabited the islands since about 23,000 years earlier (through the Sundaland land bridge and short inter-island hops). Over the next thousand years, Austronesian peoples migrated southeast to the rest of the Philippines, and into the islands of the Celebes Sea and Borneo. From southwestern Borneo, Austronesians spread further west in a single migration event to both Sumatra and the coastal regions of southern Vietnam, becoming the ancestors of the speakers of the Malayic and Chamic branches of the Austronesian language family. A 2021 study, however, suggests an earlier divergence date between Cordilleran-related groups and populations from mainland East Asia and Taiwan at ~8,000 B.P., coinciding with the Cordilleran settlement of the Philippines.

Soon after reaching the Philippines, Austronesians colonized the Northern Mariana Islands by 1500 BCE or even earlier, becoming the first humans to reach Remote Oceania. Palau and Yap were settled by separate voyages by 1000 BCE.

Another important Austronesian migration branch was by the Lapita culture, which rapidly spread into the islands off the coast of northern New Guinea and into the Solomon Islands and other parts of coastal New Guinea and Island Melanesia by 1200 BCE. They reached the islands of Fiji, Samoa, and Tonga by around 900 to 800 BCE. This remained the furthest extent of the Austronesian expansion into Polynesia until around 700 CE, when there was another surge of island colonization. It reached the Cook Islands, Tahiti, and the Marquesas by 700 CE; Hawaii by 900 CE; Rapa Nui by 1000 CE; and New Zealand by 1200 CE. For a few centuries, the Polynesian islands were connected by bidirectional long-distance sailing, with the exception of Rapa Nui, which had limited further contact due to its isolated geographical location. Island groups like the Pitcairns, the Kermadec Islands, and the Norfolk Islands were also formerly settled by Austronesians but later abandoned. There is also putative evidence, based on the spread of the sweet potato, that Austronesians may have reached South America from Polynesia, where they might have traded with the Indigenous peoples of the Americas.

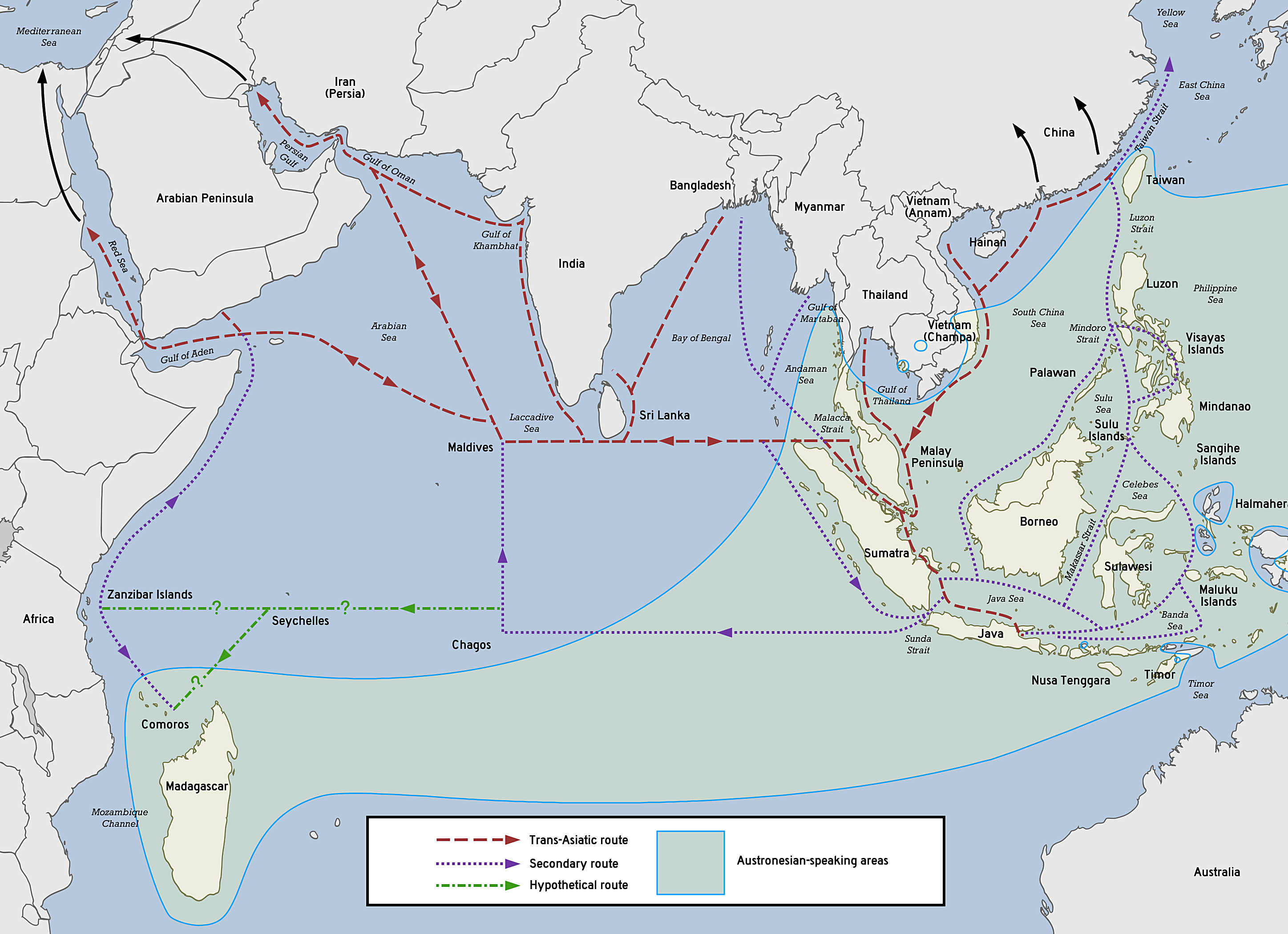
Austronesian proto-historic and historic maritime trade network in the Indian Ocean

In the Indian Ocean, Austronesians in Maritime Southeast Asia established trade links with South Asia. They also established early long-distance contacts with Africa, possibly as early as before 500 BCE, based on archaeological evidence like banana phytoliths in Cameroon and Uganda and remains of Neolithic chicken bones in Zanzibar. By the end of the first millennium BCE, Austronesians were already sailing maritime trade routes linking the Han dynasty of China with the western Indian Ocean trade in India, the Roman Empire, and Africa. An Austronesian group, originally from the Makassar Strait region around Kalimantan and Sulawesi, eventually settled Madagascar, either directly from Southeast Asia or from preexisting mixed Austronesian-Bantu populations from East Africa. Estimates for when this occurred vary, from the 5th to 7th centuries CE. It is likely that the Austronesians that settled Madagascar followed a coastal route through South Asia and East Africa, rather than directly across the Indian Ocean. Genetic evidence suggests that some individuals of Austronesian descent reached Africa and the Arabian Peninsula.

=== Bantu expansion ===
The Bantu expansion is the major prehistoric migratory pattern that shaped the ethno-linguistic composition of Sub-Saharan Africa.

The Bantu, a branch of the Niger-Congo phylum, originated in West Africa around the Benue-Cross rivers area in southeastern Nigeria. Beginning in the 2nd millennium BC, they spread to Central Africa, and later, during the 1st millennium BC onward southeastern, spreading pastoralism and agriculture. During the 1st millennium AD, they populated Southern Africa. In the process, the Bantu languages displaced the Khoisan languages indigenous to Central and Southern Africa.

=== Arctic peoples ===
One of the last areas to be permanently settled by humans was the Arctic, reached by the Dorset culture about 4,500 years ago. The Inuit are the descendants of the Thule culture, which emerged from western Alaska around AD 1000 and gradually displaced the Dorset culture.

== Proto-historical and early historical migration ==
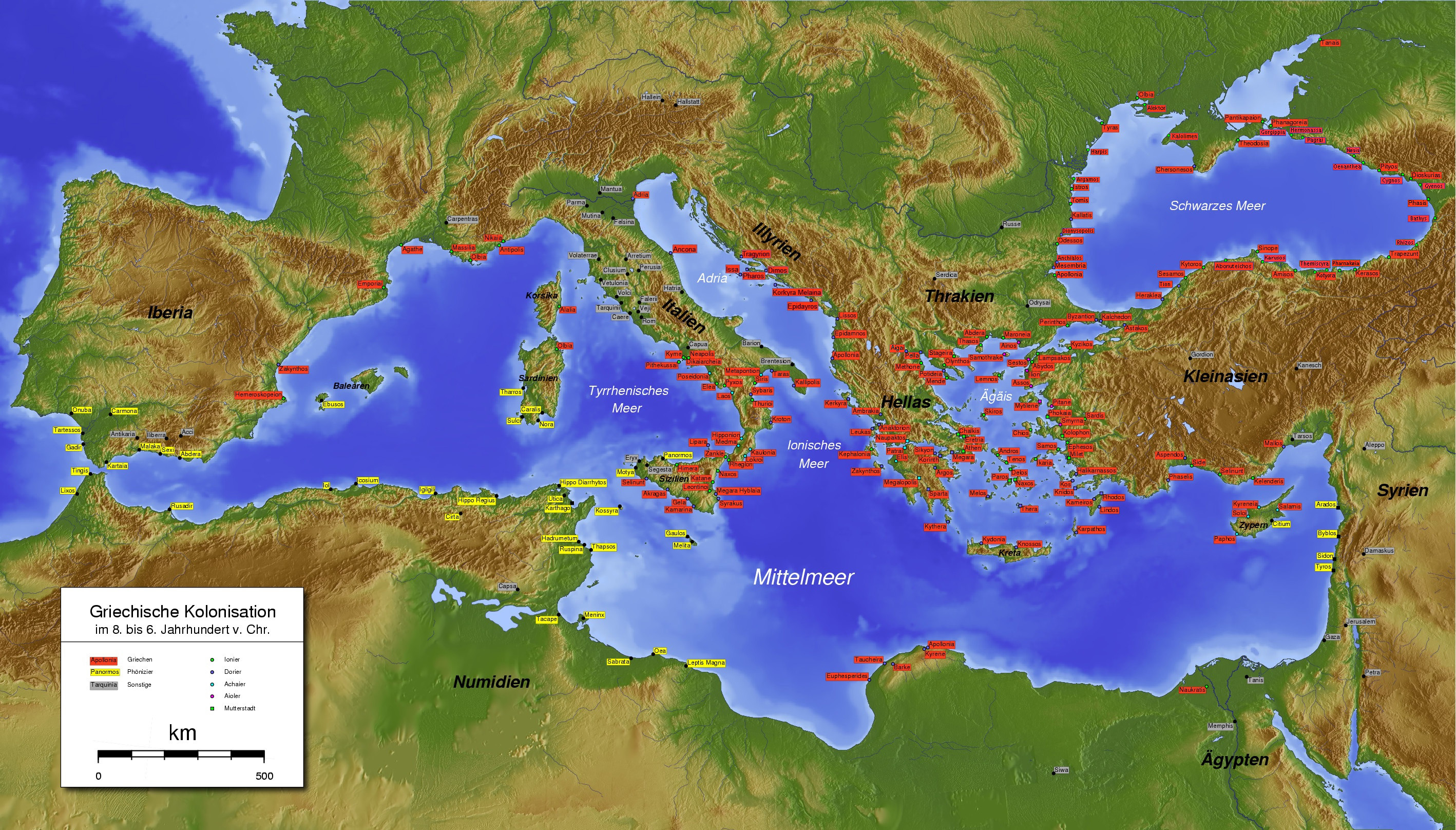
Map of Phoenician (in yellow) and Greek colonies (in red) around 8th to 6th century BC

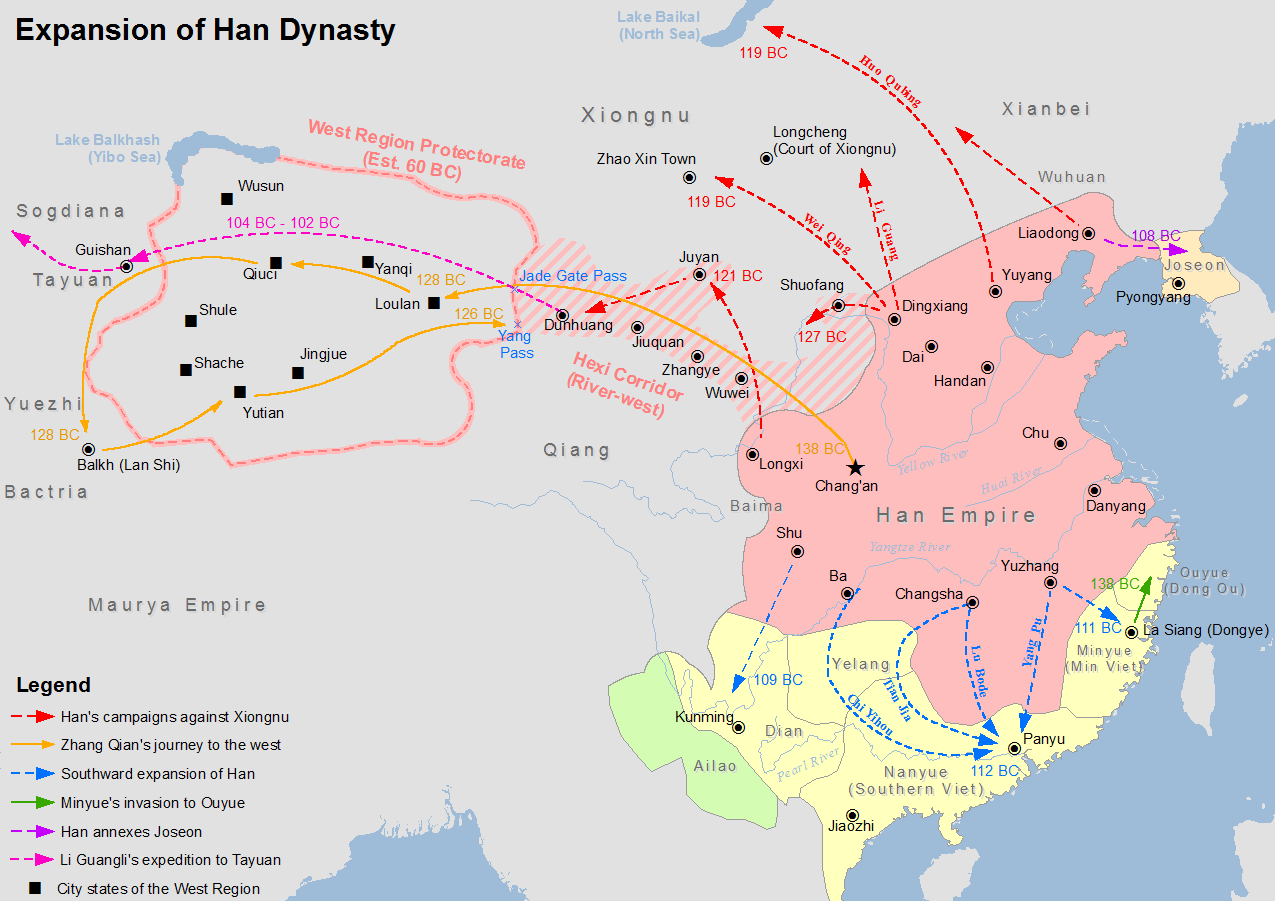
Map showing the southward migration of the Han Chinese (in blue)

The German term Landnahme ("land-taking") is sometimes used in historiography for a migration event associated with a founding legend, e.g. of the conquest of Canaan in the Hebrew Bible, the Indo-Aryan migration and expansion within India alluded to in the Rigveda, the invasion traditions in the Irish Mythological Cycle, accounting for how the Gaels came to Ireland, the arrival of the Franks in Austrasia during the Migration period, the Anglo-Saxon invasion of Britain, the settlement of Iceland in the Viking Age, the Slavic migrations, the Hungarian conquest, etc.

=== Iron Age ===
The Urartians were displaced by Armenians, and the Cimmerians and the Mushki migrated from the Caucasus into Anatolia. A Thraco-Cimmerian connection links these movements to the Proto-Celtic world of central Europe, leading to the introduction of Iron to Europe and the Celtic expansion to western Europe and the British Isles around 500 BC.

Many scholars believe that the Ethiopian Semitic languages descended from the South Semitic branch which was spoken in the South Arabia. According to this theory, the speakers of the proto-Semitic language migrated from South Arabia to Ethiopia approximately 2800 years ago.

Beginning around 300 BC, the Japonic-speaking Yayoi people from the Korean Peninsula entered the Japanese islands and displaced or intermingled with the original Jōmon inhabitants. The linguistic homeland of Proto-Koreans is located somewhere in Southern Siberia/Manchuria, such the Liao river area or the Amur region. Proto-Koreans arrived in the southern part of the Korean Peninsula at around 300 BC, replacing and assimilating Japonic-speakers and likely causing the Yayoi migration.

=== Classical period ===
Migration is also documented throughout the Roman world, where it was driven by personal motivations such as economic opportunity, as well as by state policy and military necessity. Roman rule allowed for the relatively free movement of merchants and travelers. Nevertheless, a significant portion of migration during this period was involuntary or state-directed. According to the historian Christer Bruun, the transportation of enslaved people between provinces represented "possibly the most common form of migration in the Roman world." This phenomenon is best exemplified by the mass enslavement and displacement Jews from Judaea following the Jewish–Roman wars. Another phenomenon of migration in the Roman world was the settlement of military veterans: rather than returning to their native countries, many resettled in the vicinity of their point of service. The Roman authorities also created veteran colonies in places such as northern Italy (for example Augusta Praetoria and Augusta Taurinorum), along the Danube, in Dacia, Britain and Mauretania. There is also evidence for the relocation of traders to port cities across the Mediterranean. Examples include the presence of tradesmen from Narbo, in Gaul, at various Sicilian cities; an Italian presence in Delos and North Africa; and Phoenician merchants from Tyre who settled in Rome and Puteoli. Migration occurred under several other circumstances: following natural disasters (such as the earthquake of 62 AD in Campania), due to religious persecution (following the persecution of Christians in the Roman Empire), and finally, by people in search of employment, personal change, or adventure. Migration is also attested in Roman Egypt.

=== Migration period ===
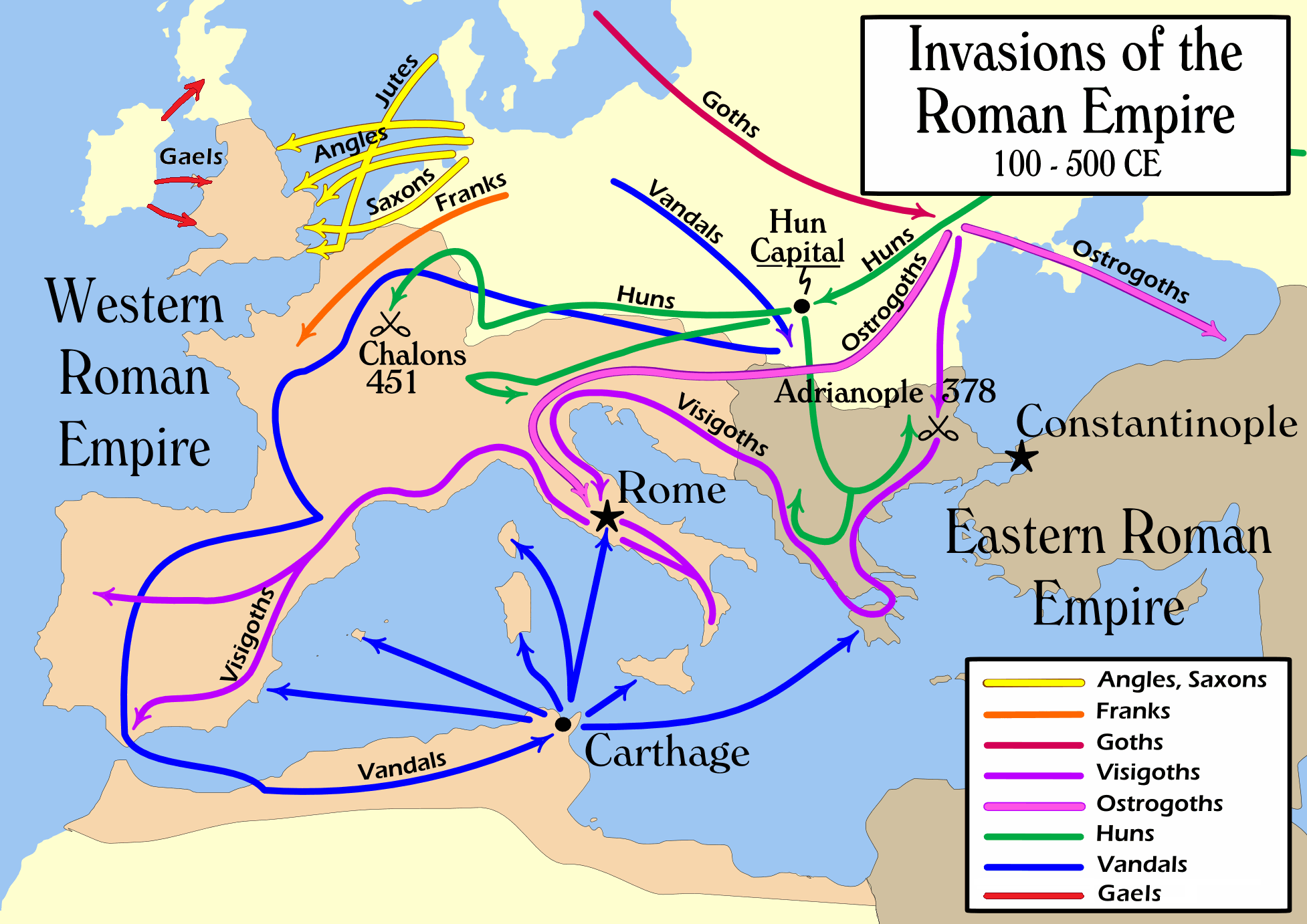
2nd to 5th century migrations. See also map of the world in 820.

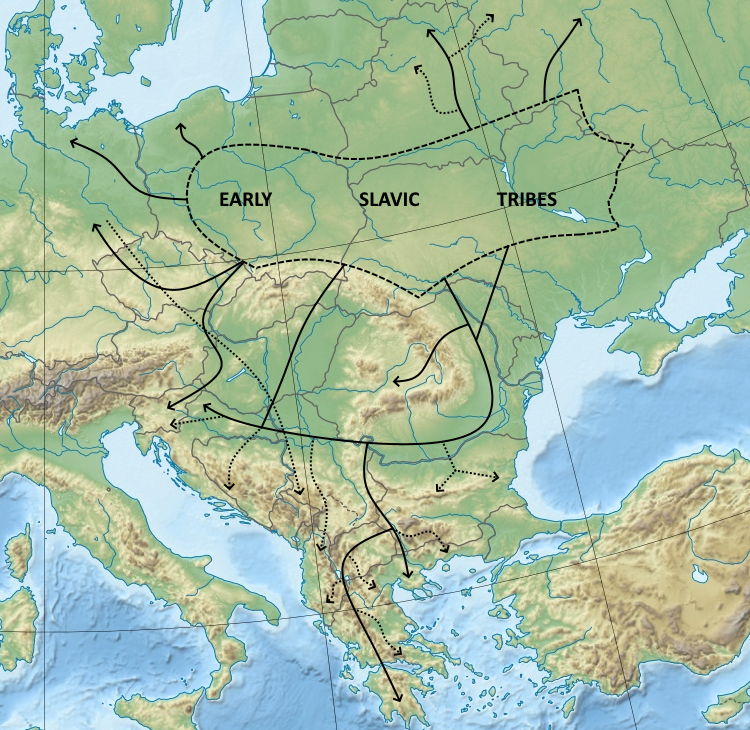
Migration of early Slavs in Europe in the 6th–7th centuries

Western historians refer to the period of migrations that separated Antiquity from the Middle Ages in Europe as the Great Migrations or as the Migrations Period. This period is further divided into two phases.

The first phase, from 300 to 500, saw the movement of Germanic, Sarmatian and Hunnic tribes and ended with the settlement of these peoples in the areas of the former Western Roman Empire. (See also: Ostrogoths, Visigoths, Vandals, Burgundians, Suebi, Alamanni, Marcomanni).

The second phase, between 500 and 900, saw Slavic, Turkic and other peoples on the move, re-settling in Eastern Europe and gradually making it predominantly Slavic. Moreover, more Germanic tribes migrated within Europe during this period, including the Lombards (to Italy), and the Angles, Saxons, and Jutes (to the British Isles). See also: Avars, Bulgars, Huns, Arabs, Vikings, Varangians. The last phase of the migrations saw the coming of the Hungarians to the Pannonian plain.

German historians of the 19th century referred to these Germanic migrations as the Völkerwanderung, the migrations of the peoples.

In the 4th or 5th century, Gaelic culture was brought to Scotland by settlers from Ireland, who founded the Gaelic kingdom of Dál Riata on Scotland's west coast. Brittany was settled by Britons from Britain between the 5th and 7th centuries.

The European migration period is connected with the simultaneous Turkic expansion which at first displaced other peoples towards the west, and by High Medieval times, the Seljuk Turks themselves reached the Mediterranean.

=== Early medieval period ===
The main migration of Turkic peoples occurred between the 5th and 10th centuries, when they spread across most of Central Asia. The Turkic peoples slowly replaced and assimilated the previous Iranian-speaking locals, turning the population of Central Asia from largely Iranian, into primarily of East Asian descent.

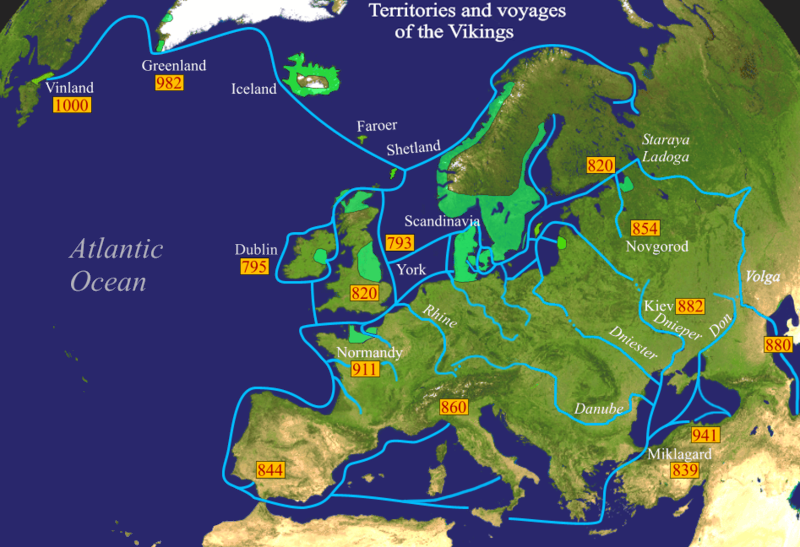
Scandinavian settlements and voyages

The medieval period, although often presented as a time of limited human mobility and slow social change in the history of Europe, in fact saw widespread movement of peoples. The Vikings from Scandinavia raided all over Europe from the 8th century and settled in many places, including Normandy, the north of England, Scotland and Ireland (most of whose urban centres were founded by the Vikings). The Normans later conquered the Saxon Kingdom of England, most of Ireland, southern Italy and Sicily.

Iberia was invaded by Umayyad in the 8th century, founding new Kingdoms such as al Andalus and bringing with them a wave of settlers from North Africa. The invasion of North Africa by the Banu Hilal, a warlike Arab Bedouin tribe, in the 11th century was a major factor in the linguistic, cultural Arabization of the Maghreb.

The Burmese-speaking people first migrated from present-day Yunnan, China to the Irrawaddy valley in the 7th century.

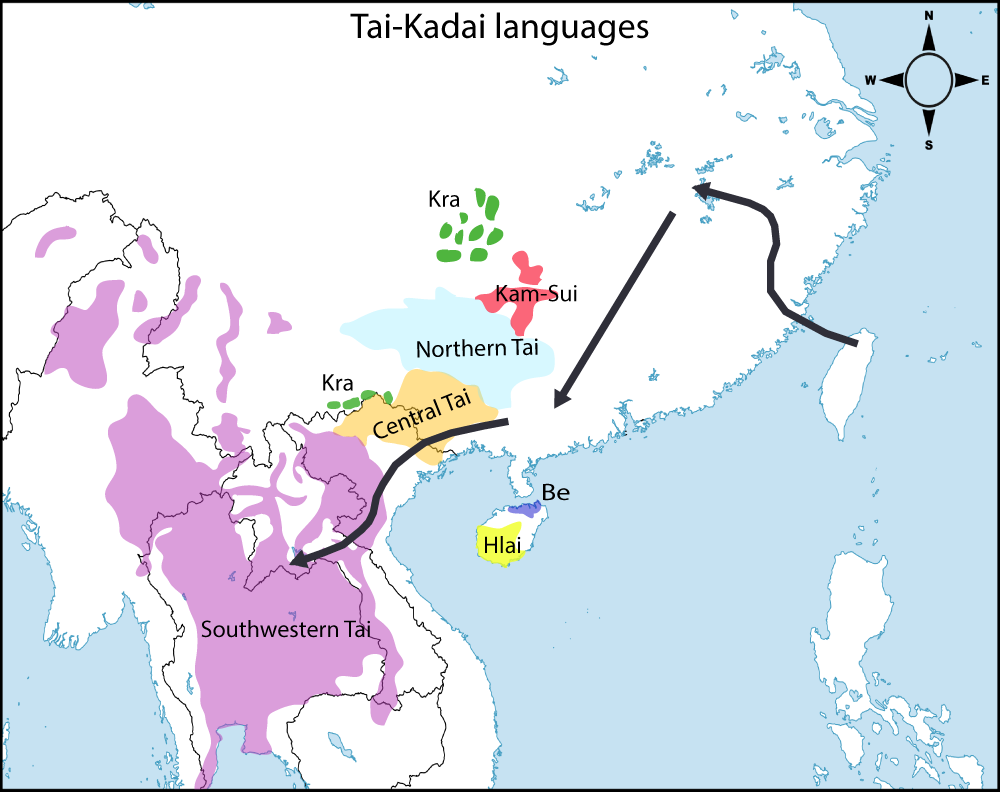
Tai-Kadai migration route according to Matthias Gerner's Northeast to Southwest Hypothesis.

The Tai peoples, from Guangxi began moving south – and westwards in the 1st millennium AD, eventually spreading across the whole of mainland Southeast Asia. Tai speaking tribes migrated southwestward along the rivers and over the lower passes into Southeast Asia, perhaps prompted by the Chinese expansion.

During the 4th–12th centuries, Han Chinese people from the central plains migrated and settled in the South of China. This gave rise to the Cantonese people and other dialect groups of Guangdong during the Tang dynasty. Genetic studies have shown that the Hakka people are largely descended from North Han Chinese. In a series of migrations, the Hakkas moved and settled in their present areas in South China.

Archaeological, historical and linguistic evidence suggest that the Nahuas originally came from the deserts of northern Mexico and migrated into central Mexico in several waves. The Aztecs were descended of Nahua ancestry, and the Toltecs are often thought to have been as well. After the fall of the Toltecs a period of large population movements followed and some Nahua groups such as the Nicarao arrived as far south as Nicaragua.

== Late Middle Ages ==
The migration of the Romani people through the Middle East to Europe

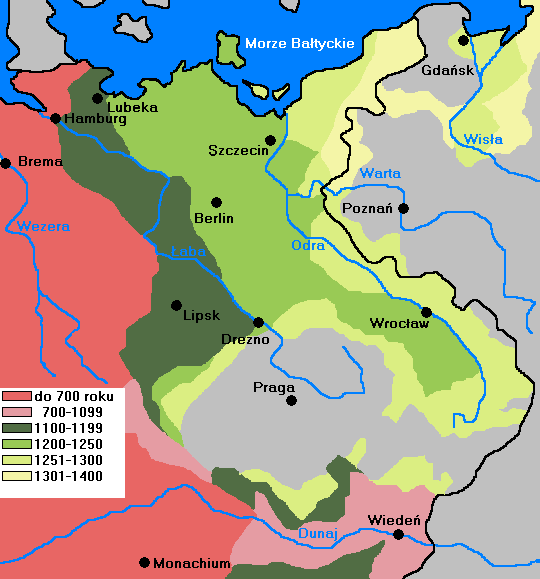
Stages of the German eastern expansion, 700–1400

Massive migrations of Germans took place into East Central and Eastern Europe, reaching its peak in the 12th to 14th centuries. These Ostsiedlung settlements in part followed territorial gains of the Holy Roman Empire, but areas beyond were settled, too.

Arvanites in Greece originate from Albanian settlers who moved south from areas in what is today southern Albania during the Middle Ages. They were the dominant population element of some regions in the south of Greece until the 19th century. Romance-speaking Vlachs were shepherds who migrated along the Carpathian Mountains with their herds.

The Navajos and Apaches are believed to have migrated from northwestern Canada and eastern Alaska, where the majority of Athabaskan speakers reside. Archaeological and historical evidence suggests the Athabaskan ancestors of the Navajos and Apaches entered the Southwest around 1400.

During the several centuries before Columbus's arrival in the Caribbean archipelago in 1492, the Caribs had in part displaced the Arawakan-speaking Taínos by warfare, extermination, and assimilation. The Taíno had settled the island chains earlier in history, migrating from the mainland. Arawak-speaking farmers replaced previous foraging populations about 2,500 years ago.

At the end of the Middle Ages, the Romani arrived in Europe from the Middle East. They originate in India, probably an offshoot of the Domba people of Northern India who had left for Sassanid Persia around the 5th century.

Turkic-speaking Yakut tribes migrated north from the Lake Baikal region to their present homeland in Yakutia in central Siberia under pressure from the Mongol tribes during the 13th to 15th centuries.

The Fula people are widely distributed, across the Sahel from the Atlantic coast to the Red Sea, particularly in West Africa. As their herds increased, small groups of Fulani herdsmen found themselves forced to move eastward and further southwards and so initiated a series of migrations throughout West Africa, which endures to the present day. By the 15th century, there was a steady flow of Fulɓe immigrants into Hausaland and, later on, Bornu.

== Early Modern period ==
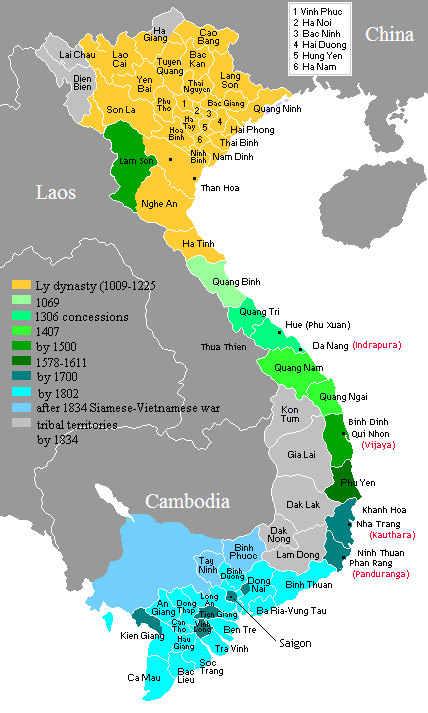
Map of Vietnam showing the conquest of the south (the Nam tiến, 1069–1757).

=== Asia ===
Conflict between the Hmong people of southern China and newly arrived Han settlers increased during the 18th century. This led to armed conflict and large-scale migrations well into the late 19th century, the period during which many Hmong people immigrated to Southeast Asia. The most likely homeland of the Hmong–Mien languages is in Southern China between the Yangtze and Mekong rivers, but speakers of these languages might have migrated from Central China as part of the Han Chinese expansion or as a result of exile from an original homeland by Han Chinese.

=== Africa ===
The Oromo migrations were a series of expansions in the 16th and 17th centuries by the Oromo people from southern Ethiopia into more northerly regions of Ethiopia.

Expansion of the Zulu Kingdom in South Africa in the early 19th century was a major factor of the Mfecane, a mass-migration of tribes fleeing the Zulus. The Ngoni people fled as far north as Tanzania and Malawi. The Mfengu refers to a variety of ethnic groups that fled from the Mfecane to enter into various Xhosa speaking areas.

=== North America ===
The Shoshone originated in the western Great Basin and spread north and east into present-day Idaho and Wyoming. By 1500, some Eastern Shoshone had crossed the Rocky Mountains into the Great Plains. After 1750, warfare and pressure pushed Eastern Shoshone south and westward. Some of them moved as far south as Texas, emerging as the Comanche by 1700.

Siouan languages speakers may have originated in the lower Mississippi River region. They were agriculturalists and may have been part of the Mound Builder civilization during the 9th–12th centuries AD. In the late 16th and early 17th centuries, Dakota-Lakota speakers lived in the upper Mississippi Region. Wars with the Ojibwe and Cree peoples pushed the Lakota west onto the Great Plains in the mid- to late-17th century.

During the 1640s and 1650s, the Beaver Wars initiated by the Iroquois forced a massive demographic shift as their western neighbors fled the violence. They sought refuge west and north of Lake Michigan.

=== Early Modern Europe ===
Expulsions of Jews in Europe from 1100 to 1600

The migration of the Mongolic-speaking Kalmyks to the Volga in the 17th century was the last wave of the westward expansion of Central Asian nomads.

Internal European migration stepped up in the Early Modern Period. In this period, major migration within Europe included the recruiting by monarchs of landless laborers to settle depopulated or uncultivated regions and a series of forced migration caused by religious persecution. Notable examples of this phenomenon include the expulsion of the Jews from Spain in 1492, mass migration of Protestants from the Spanish Netherlands to the Dutch Republic after the 1580s, the expulsion of the Moriscos (descendants of former Muslims) from Spain in 1609, and the expulsion of the Huguenots from France in the 1680s. Since the 14th century, the Serbs started leaving the areas of their medieval Kingdom and Empire that was overrun by the Ottoman Turks and migrated to the north, to the lands of today's Vojvodina (northern Serbia), which was ruled by the Kingdom of Hungary at that time. The Habsburg monarchs of Austria encouraged them to settle on their frontier with the Turks and provide military service by granting them free land and religious toleration. The two greatest migrations took place in 1690 and 1737. Other instances of labour recruitments include the Plantations of Ireland – the settling of Ireland with Protestant colonists from England, Scotland and Wales in the period 1560–1690 – and the recruitment of Germans by Catherine the Great of Russia to settle the Volga region in the 18th century.

=== Colonial empires ===
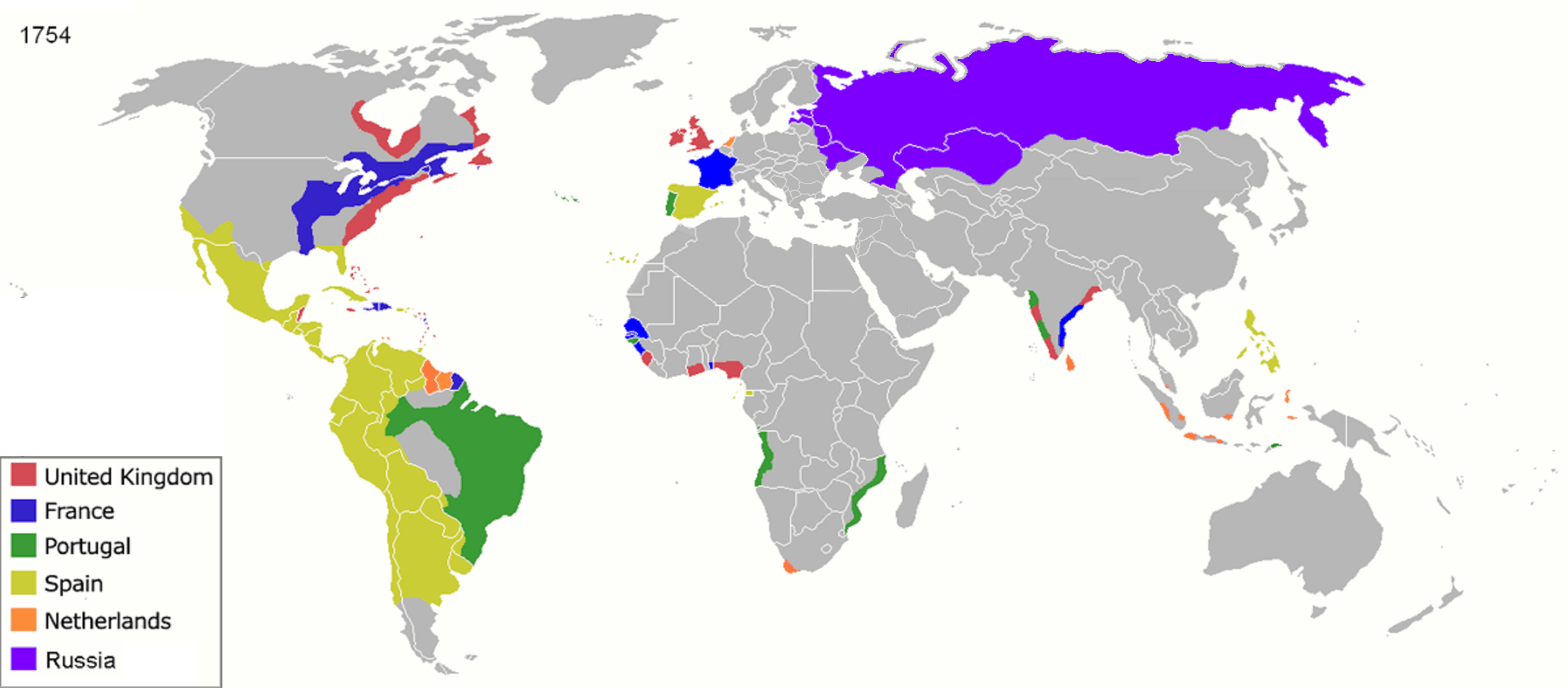
Map of colonial empires throughout the world in 1754, prior to the Seven Years' War

European Colonialism from the 16th to the early 20th centuries led to an imposition of a European colonies in many regions of the world, particularly in the Americas, South Asia, Sub-Saharan Africa and Australia, where European languages remain either prevalent or in frequent use as administrative languages. Major human migration before the 18th century was largely state directed, although some private companies were involved. For instance, Spanish emigration to the New World was limited to settlers from Castile who were intended to act as soldiers or administrators. Mass immigration was not encouraged due to a labour shortage in Spain (of which Spain was the worst affected in Europe by a depopulation of its core territories in the 17th century).

Europeans also tended to die of tropical diseases in the New World in this period and for this reason England, France and Spain preferred using slaves as free labor in their American possessions. Many historians attribute a change in this pattern in the 18th century to population increases in Europe.

However, in the less tropical regions of North America's east coast, large numbers of religious dissidents, mostly English Puritans, settled during the early 17th century. Spanish restrictions on emigration to Latin America were revoked and the English colonies in North America also saw a major influx of settlers attracted by cheap or free land, economic opportunity and the continued lure of religious toleration.

A period in which various early English colonies had a significant amount of self-rule prevailed from the time of the Plymouth colony's founding in 1620 through 1676, as the mother country was wracked by revolution and general instability. However, King William III decisively intervened in colonial affairs after 1688 and the English colonies gradually came more directly under royal governance, with a marked effect on the type of emigration. During the early 18th century, significant numbers of non-English seekers of greater religious and political freedom were allowed to settle within the British colonies, including Protestant German Palatines displaced by French conquest, French Huguenots disenfranchised by an end of religious tolerance, Scotch-Irish Presbyterians, Quakers who were often Welsh, as well as Presbyterian and Catholic Scottish Highlanders seeking a new start after a series of unsuccessful revolts.

The English colonists who came during this period were increasingly moved by economic necessity. Some colonies, including Georgia and New South Wales (Australia) were settled heavily by petty criminals and indentured servants who hoped to pay off their debts. By 1800, European emigration had transformed the demographic character of the American continent. This was due to the devastating effect of European diseases and warfare on Native American populations.

The European settlers' influence elsewhere was less pronounced as in South Asia and Africa, except French Algeria, European settlement in this period was limited to a thin layer of administrators, traders and soldiers. Dutch-speaking settlers known as Boers arrived in southern Africa in the mid-17th century. In New Zealand, the 1840 Treaty of Waitangi guaranteed co-existence and cultural freedom for the indigenous Māori on the condition of British sovereignty. During the decolonisation of the 19th century, French Algerians were expelled by the new independent government. This also happened on a varying scale in many new independent African countries during the era.

== See also ==
- Linguistic homeland
- Nomadic pastoralism
- Cultural diffusion
- Timeline of maritime migration and exploration
