= Hans Binswanger-Mkhize =

Swiss economist (1943–2017)

- Born: Hans P. Binswanger-Mkhize; 1943; Kreuzlingen, Switzerland
- Died: August 4, 2017 (aged 73–74); Pretoria, South Africa
- Citizenship: Swiss
- Occupation: Economist
- Children: Ingrid A. Binswanger

Hans P. Binswanger-Mkhize (born in Kreuzlingen (Switzerland) in 1943, died August 4, 2017 in Pretoria (South Africa) was a Swiss economist. His research focused mainly on agricultural economics in developing countries.

== Biography ==
A native of Kreuzlingen, Hans Binswanger studied first at the University of Paris, where he earned a certificate in political sciences in 1964, followed by a MS in agricultural sciences from the ETH Zurich in 1969. In 1973, Binswanger completed his PhD in economics at the North Carolina State University. After his PhD, Binswanger worked at International Crops Research Institute for the Semi-Arid Tropics (ICRISAT) in Hyderabad from 1975 to 1980, during which he also briefly held a position as research associate at Yale University. From 1980 to 2005, Binswanger worked in various positions for the World Bank, before taking up a position as senior fellow at the Amsterdam Institute for Development, which he held until his death. Moreover, Binswanger was professor extraordinarius at the Tshwane University of Technology (South Africa). His research was acknowledged by the American Agricultural Economics Association with a fellowship in 1997, through another fellowship from the American Association for the Advancement of Science in 2002 and with the Elmhirst Medal of the International Association of Agricultural Economists in 2006.

== Research ==
Binswanger's fields of work combined topics from agricultural economics, development economics, political economy, the economics of technology, and environmental economics. In terms of research output, he ranked among the top 3% of economists registered on IDEAS/RePEc.

=== Economics of Technical Change and Its Impacts, and Agricultural Mechanization ===
A key area of Binswanger's research has been the economics of technical change in agriculture, in particular agricultural mechanization, and its impacts. In an early study of technical change in U.S. agriculture in 1912–68, Binswanger shows that the adoption of innovations is induced by changes in relative factor prices, although these changes have to be very large. This concept of induced innovation and its relationship with technology, institutions and development is further explored in 1978 in an eponymous book co-authored with Vernon Ruttan. In the 1970s and 1980s, Binswanger also conducted research on agricultural mechanization. For instance, summarizing the literature on the economics of tractors in India, Pakistan and Nepal, Binswanger argues that surveys of tractor use fail to find statistically significant impacts on growth in yields, timeliness or gross farm returns, and – at least until the 1980s – tractors failed to support South Asian agricultural growth. Reviewing historical patterns of agricultural mechanization, Binswanger shows that in both developed and developing countries power-intensive processes were mechanized first, followed by control-intensive operations, with small manufacturers (and not the public sector or corporate research) typically initiating the process of inventing new types of machinery. Together with Prabdhu Pingali and Yves Bigot, Binswanger also investigated patterns of agricultural mechanization and the evolution of farming systems in sub-Saharan Africa, highlighting that many technological failures were due to mismatches between technological strategies, farming systems and countries endowments of land, labour and climate. Overall, reviewing the effect of technical change and commercialization in agriculture on the poor until the late 1980s, Binswanger concluded that these dynamics stimulate growth in agriculture, rural development and food supply, though these don't generally lend themselves to poverty targeting.

=== Economic Behaviour under Risk and Uncertainty ===
In the 1980s, Binswanger turned to the study of economic behaviour in agriculture under risk and uncertainty. Through an experiment in rural India, he notably found large discrepancies between experimental measures of risk aversion and certainty equivalents elicited through interviews, with the experimental measures suggesting that, for high payoffs, nearly everybody was moderately risk averse, with even wealthy individuals not significantly less risk averse; more specifically, Binswanger observed decreasing absolute risk aversion, increasing partial risk aversion, declining relative risk aversion, and asset disaggregation. Summarizing the literature on risk aversion and farmers' credit constraints, Binswanger and Donald Sillers find that farmers in developing countries are almost universally risk averse and show why many lenders would ask rural borrowers for collateral, giving credence to the view that small farmers may be at a disadvantage because of credit constraints. Finally, Binswanger and Mark Rosenzweig document how farmers adapt the composition of their agricultural investments in response to the exposure of the profitability of their agricultural activities to weather risk.

=== Agricultural Production Relations and Econometric Studies ===
Many of Binswanger's studies of agricultural dynamics are econometric, with early works including e.g. the measurement of elasticities of factor demand and substitution and a microeconomic approach to induced innovation. In a study with Maw-Cheng Yang, Alan Bowers and Yair Mundlak on the determinants of cross-country aggregate agricultural supply, Binswanger finds only weak short-run supply elasticities within countries. Further work of Binswanger has investigated the policy response of agriculture, highlighting agriculture's low price short-run price elasticity, the role of investments in infrastructure, institutions and public goods, and the effects of structural adjustment programmes. Last, Binswanger, Rosenzweig and Shahidur Khandker describe how the availability of education infrastructure and rural banks co-determine agricultural investment and agricultural output's price responsiveness, with public infrastructure investments in turn being determined by agroclimatic potential and bank locations being influenced by public infrastructure investments. With Rosenzweig, Binswanger has developed an influential model of agricultural production and its behavioural and material determinants that facilitates the analysis of barriers to the emergence of rural financial markets and efficient agricultural factor markets, along further implications. By contrast, earlier work of Binswanger and Rosenzweig addresses contractual arrangements, employment and wages in rural labour markets. Another major contribution of Binswanger's research – together with Klaus Deininger and Gershon Feder – is an analysis of the power relationships governing rental and sales markets for agricultural land in developing countries and their impacts on policy distortions, revolts and reforms.

=== Environment, Natural Resource Management and Policies ===
In the 1990s, Binswanger's research turned increasingly towards environmental topics. For instance, he showed that general tax policies, special tax incentives, the rules of land allocation and the agricultural credit system in Brazil all contributed to the acceleration of deforestation of the Amazon rainforest, increasing in the process the size of land holdings and reducing the chances of the poor to become farmers. Turning to water rights, Binswanger (together with Mark Rosegrant) makes the case for tradable water rights as a means to formalize and secure the water rights held by water users, reduce transaction costs and induce the internalization of opportunity costs and negative externalities (e.g. due to irrigation). Addressing the relationship between natural resource degradation and population growth in Colombia, Binswanger (with Jon Heath) argues that rather than being population-driven, natural resource degradation is mainly driven by policies that constrain poor people's access to land.

=== Land Policy and Land Reform ===
Since the mid-1990s, Binswanger has also extensively written about land policy and land reform. Studying South Africa's case, Binswanger and Deininger argue that the dualistic structure of its farm structure – a few very large, highly productive farms often owned by Afrikaner and many relatively small farms owned by native Africans – cannot be explained due to economies of scale in the commercial sector, but is instead due to systematic historical distortions in land allocation, output markets, and access to infrastructure, rural finance and public services; the topic of land reform in South Africa is further explored with regard to policies, markets and mechanisms with Johan van Zyl and Johann Kirsten. At the turn of the century, Binswanger and Deininger examine the evolution of the World Bank's land policy, highlighting (i) the desirability of owner-operated family farms, (ii) the need for markets permitting land transfers to more productive users, and (iii) an egalitarian asset distribution. To this, they add the relative cost effectiveness of communal tenure systems, the assessment of titling programms based on efficiency and equity, the potential of land rental markets, the integration of the development of land-sale markets into broader rural development initiatives, the success of decentralized and market-oriented approaches to land reform, and the need for adaptation to local conditions.

=== Rural Finance ===
In a study by Binswanger and Khandker, both argue that the impact of credit expansion on agricultural output in India has been insubstantial, with the programme having a positive return on investment only under very optimistic assumptions. More recently, Binswanger-Mkhize has argued on the subject of weather index-based agricultural insurance that its prospects for upscaling are poor, given that better-off farmers tend to already be insured through income diversification and social networks, whereas poor farmers are too cash constrained to afford the premia for an insurance that will pay out at earliest after harvest.
