= Mark Rosenzweig (economist) =

Academic background
- Education: Columbia University (BA, MA, PhD)

Academic work
- Discipline: Development economics
- Institutions: Yale University
- Website: Information at IDEAS / RePEc

Mark Richard Rosenzweig is an economist and the Frank Altschul Professor of International Economics at Yale University, where he also directs the Economic Growth Center. Rosenzweig is one of the world's most prominent agricultural and development economists and is one of the leading scholars on the subjects of the economics of insurance and migration.

== Biography ==
Mark Rosenzweig earned a B.A. from Columbia College in 1969 as well as an M.A. and Ph.D. from Columbia University in 1971 and 1973, respectively. Following his graduation, Rosenzweig worked first as an assistant professor (1973–78) and later as an associate professor of economics at Yale University (1978–79) before moving to the University of Minnesota, where he was made a full professor in 1982 and became co-director of the university's Economic Development Center. In 1990, Rosenzweig moved further as a professor of economics to the University of Pennsylvania (1990–2001), at whose Population Studies Center he has since then been a research associate and where he became the Walter H. Annenberg Professor in the Social Sciences (2001–02). Thereafter, he briefly held the position of Mohamed Kamal Professor of Public Policy at the Kennedy School of Government at Harvard University (2002–05) and serving as director of the Center for International Development (2004–05). Finally, Rosenzweig returned to Yale University in 2005 as the Frank Altschul Professor of International Economics and has led Yale's Economic Growth Center as its director since 2006. Additionally, Rosenzweig has held visiting appointments at Princeton University, the University of Chicago, and Stanford University.

Mark Rosenzweig maintains affiliations with various institutions, including NBER and has worked for several national and international agencies, including the International Monetary Fund, RAND Corporation, and the National Institutes of Health. In terms of professional service, Rosenzweig served in different roles in the American Economic Association, including on its executive committee. Moreover, he has performed editorial duties for academic journals such as the Review of Economics and Statistics, Journal of Economic Literature, World Bank Economic Review, Journal of Development Economics, and, more recently, the Pakistan Development Review and China Economic Review. Finally, Rosenzweig's research has been recognized with distinctions such as the NIH Research Service Award (1976–77), the Award for Distinguished Contribution to Scholarship in Population from the ASA (2009), the Yangtze River Scholarship (2014), and fellowships of the Econometric Society (1994), Society of Labor Economists (2006), and American Academy of Arts and Sciences (2013).

== Research ==
Mark Rosenzweig's research interests include economic development, the causes and consequences of economic development, and international migration. Geographically, his research tends to be concentrated in South Asia and more recently in China. According to IDEAS/RePEc, he ranks among the most cited 1% of economists. Moreover, he is one of the current co-editors of the Handbook of Development Economics (with Dani Rodrik) as well as the creator of the Handbook of Population and Family Economics (with Oded Stark), both of which serve as references for researchers in their respective fields. Much of Rosenzweig's research exploits natural experiments such as twin studies; nonetheless, Rosenzweig has criticized the literature of natural experiments for often not making explicit the set of behavioral, market and technological assumptions necessary to justify the studies' interpretations of estimates, resulting in findings that are sometimes highly sensitive to relaxing some of these assumptions.

=== The fertility decisions of rural households ===
Since the mid-1970s, much of Rosenzweig's research has focused on family economics, including fertility and intra-household decisions. Early research conducted by Rosenzweig and Robert Evenson underlines the importance of the economic contributions of children to households in rural India: in particular, they find fertility and child labour to increase in the financial returns to child labour and to decrease in the wage rates of adult women. In further work with Kenneth Wolpin, Rosenzweig studied how female labour supply over the life-cycle is affected by fertility; using twins in women's first pregnancies as an unanticipated and thus exogenous variation in fertility, they find that the ratio of births to pregnancies has no effect on women's lifetime labour supply. In a similar vein, Rosenzweig and Wolpin demonstrate how twins can be used to test the hypothesis of a tradeoff between fertility and the "quality" of a household's offspring.

=== The economics of intrahousehold resource allocation and child health ===
In a body of research closely related to his study of rural households' fertility decisions, Rosenzweig has analysed the allocation of resources within households and its consequences. Together with T. Paul Schultz, Rosenzweig examines how the allocation of resources within families responds to changes in economic conditions as well as to differences in children's genetic endowments by estimating the determinants of variations in the differentials between the survival rates of male and female children in rural India. In particular, they find that female children receive a larger share of household resources relative to male children the higher women's expected labour market participation and earnings prospects. In another study with Schultz, Rosenzweig documents how households' demand for medical care, smoking or fertility are determined by individual heterogeneity, and thereby ultimately significantly affect fetal growth and birth weight. By contrast, Rosenzweig, Mark Pitt and Mohammed Hassan investigate the impact of the inequality in the distribution of food within Bangladeshi households on household members' productivity and health; they find that both the higher level and greater variance in male calorie consumption can partly be explained by men's engagement in activities wherein productivity depends more on health status than this is generally the case for women. Finally, in a study with Jere Behrman, Rosenzweig offers evidence that returns in terms of adult schooling attainment (and partly also in terms of higher earnings) to increasing birthweight are high and are underestimated by up to 50% if genetics and family background aren't controlled for. However, Rosenzweig and Behrman also find that differences in birthweights don't play a large role in determining the world distribution of income.

=== Risk coping mechanisms of rural households ===
In the late 1980s, Rosenzweig's research also came to address the question of how rural households cope with risk. Therein, Rosenzweig highlights the role of household structure in mitigating income volatility risks in rural areas through implicit contracts and how households' ability to mitigate risk ex post in turn affects households' willingness to bear risk ex ante through their selection of formal tenancy contracts. Another risk coping mechanism in rural areas that has been studied by Rosenzweig is nuptial migration, wherein families marry their daughters to dispersed, yet kinship-related households in order to create and strengthen a network of implicit contractual arrangements between households that enables them to diversify income risks. A non-social mechanism to smooth consumption in rural India that Rosenzweig and Wolpin find are bullocks, which present the advantage of also being usable as (durable) production assets but for which there is no permanently liquid market. Finally and more recently, Rosenzweig and Andrew D. Foster examine income transfers within families among altruistic and selfish agents under imperfect commitment in South Asian and find that imperfect commitment substantially constrains informal transfer arrangements among both kin and unrelated individuals, which confers an important role to altruism in terms of ameliorating commitment constraints and thus facilitating risk sharing.

=== Human capital decisions of households ===
Another strand of Rosenzweig's research deals with households' decisions of how much to invest in whose human capital. Using twin experiments, Rosenzweig, Jere Behrman and Paul Taubman find that 27% of the variance in income and 42% of the variance in obesity between individuals in the United States can be explained by individuals' unique endowments. The effect of these individual endowments are further reinforced through schooling, though somewhat diluted as men with high individual endowments tend to marry less educated wives. In another study using twins, Behrman and Rosenzweig find that increasing the schooling of women doesn't increase the schooling of their children once heritable ability and assortative matching are taken into account, and instead reduces the time mothers spend at home. In research with Kaivan Munshi on the interactions between caste, gender and schooling choice under the influence of globalization in Mumbai, Rosenzweig finds that male working-class and lower-caste networks keep channelling boys into local language schools, which lead to traditional occupations with comparatively low wages; by contrast, lower caste girls, who didn't and don't benefit from the network, have switched to a much higher degree to English schools and are taking advantage of the thus broadened labour market opportunities. Finally, in a study with Junsen Zhang, Rosenzweig uses twins to investigate whether China's one-child policy increased parents' investments into human capital. Even though they find that an unexpected child significantly decreases the schooling progress, expected college enrollment, school grades and assessed health of all children in the household, the decrease isn't large enough to warrant the conclusion that the contribution of the one-child policy to the development of China's capital was substantial.

=== Agricultural investments and technological change in agriculture ===
Another major body of research by Rosenzweig has been the study of agricultural investments (generally with Hans Binswanger) and of the diffusion of technology in agriculture (mostly with Andrew D. Foster). With Binswanger, Rosenzweig has developed an influential model of agricultural production and its behavioural and material determinants that facilitates the analysis of barriers to the emergence of rural financial markets and efficient agricultural factor markets, along further implications. In another study, Rosenzweig and Binswanger describe how agricultural output is developed in a "complex interactive process" between farmers, government and financial intermediaries. The availability of education infrastructure and rural banks are strong determinants of agricultural investment and agricultural output's responsiveness to prices, with public infrastructure investments in turn being determined by agroclimatic potential and bank locations being influenced by public infrastructure investments. Finally, Rosenzweig and Binswanger document how farmers adapt the composition of their agricultural investments in response to the exposure of the profitability of their agricultural activities to weather risk.

In their work on technical change in agriculture, Rosenzweig and Foster analyse the adoption and profitability of high-yielding varieties (HYVs) in rural India during the Green Revolution; they find that farmers' lack of knowledge of how to manage the seeds was initially a major barrier to their adoption but gradually diminished over time as farmers' own experience as well as the experience of their fellow farmers with HYVs increased the profitability of HYVs through mutual learning; had farmers taken these learning spillovers into account in their decisions to adopt HYVs, the process of HYV diffusion would have been faster. In another study in rural India, Foster and Rosenzweig later assess how technological change during the Green Revolution affected returns to human capitals and investments; they find that the returns to (primary) schooling increased along with technical change and that the increases in these returns then induced households to invest more into schooling and fostered the availability of schools, which in turn increased the population's level of schooling. Reviewing the literature on the microeconomics of technological diffusion with a focus on developing countries, Foster and Rosenzweig identify the financial and nonfinancial returns to the adoption of technologies, one's own learning and social learning about technology use, technological externalities, economies of scale, schooling, credit constraints, risk and incomplete insurance, and "irrational" behaviour as factors affecting economic agents' adoption of new technologies and/or inputs complementary with such new technologies.

== Awards ==
In 2017, Rosenzweig and his coauthor, Junsen Zhang, received the Sun Yefang Award for economics science, one of the highest economics honors in China, for their article Do Population Control Policies Induce More Human Capital Investment? Twins, Birth Weight and China's "One-Child" Policy.
