= Labor Movement: How Migration Regulates Labor Markets =

2006 book by Harald Bauder

- Cover
- Author: Harald Bauder
- Language: English
- Subject: Migration, labor markets
- Genre: Non-fiction
- Publisher: Oxford University Press
- Publication date: February 2006
- Pages: 288
- ISBN: 978-0195180879

Labor Movement: How Migration Regulates Labor Markets is a monograph by German-Canadian economic geographer and academic Harald Bauder. The book explores the crucial role of international migrants in sustaining industrialized economies by serving in various sectors such as childcare, construction, and agriculture. Bauder challenges conventional economic theories by suggesting that migration shapes labor markets through social and cultural mechanisms rather than being solely driven by economic demand. Using case studies from Europe and North America, Bauder illustrates how the labor of migrants is systematically devalued and marginalized, proposing new perspectives on migrant labor's socio-economic impact.

== Background ==
The book is based on research Bauder conducted as a postdoctoral researcher at the University of British Columbia and during his first professorial appointment at the University of Guelph. He subsequently developed his ideas on immigration to Canada and Germany in the book Immigration Dialectic, on critical perspectives of international borders and migration in Migration Borders Freedom, and on the global state-system's role of migrant exclusion and urban migrant solidarity in From Sovereignty to Solidarity.

== Synopsis ==
The book provides an analysis of the interplay between immigration and labor market dynamics in neoliberal economies. Bauder challenges the conventional perspective that labor market needs drive immigration, positing instead that the presence of immigrant and migrant workers actively shapes labor markets. He employs labor market segmentation theory and the concepts of social and cultural capital, particularly drawing on Bourdieu’s theories, to explore how immigrant labor is systematically devalued and segmented into lower tiers of the labor market, thus benefiting native workers and employers.

Through three detailed case studies in Vancouver, Berlin, and rural Ontario, Bauder illustrates how immigration policies and cultural representations perpetuate labor market segmentation. In Vancouver, South Asian and former Yugoslav immigrants face deskilling despite their qualifications, reflecting the Canadian state's dual role in recognizing and devaluing foreign credentials. In Berlin, legal distinctions between citizens and non-citizens, as well as historical experiences, shape the labor market experiences of immigrants from the former Yugoslavia and ethnic Germans from the Soviet Union (also known as Aussiedler und Spätaussiedler). The study in Ontario focuses on how seasonal farm workers from the Caribbean and Mexico are discursively marginalized to justify their exploitation. Bauder's work underscores the complexity of labor market regulation through immigration, revealing the socio-economic processes that maintain these hierarchies.

== Reviews ==
Catherine Nolin highlighted Bauder's insightful analysis on the critical role and vulnerability of immigrant workers in labor markets in Vancouver, Berlin, and rural Ontario. While she praised its empirical richness and relevance for policymakers but critiqued the book for an uneasy fit between vulnerability and the concept of integration, Nolin noted that Bauder's market-centric view of integration seems to reinforce exclusion and vulnerability. Nolin thought the book is valuable for university courses on migration and settlement.

Marion Traub-Werner said the book is a well-timed and insightful study that effectively demonstrates how immigration policies and labor market segmentation systematically undermine immigrant workers' opportunities. Traub-Werner stressed the thorough analysis but noted some limitations, such as the under-exploration of political economies in specific locales and the oversimplification of social differences under the citizen/non-citizen binary.

Oded Stark found the book to be theoretically interesting but lacking in depth and rigor in its arguments. Stark highlighted Bauder's emphasis on the role of culture in migration but criticized the book for not thoroughly investigating its claims. He said the book raises valid points about the economic effects of migration, even when not economically motivated. Stark suggested that the book could benefit from more empirical analysis and a clearer differentiation between family traditions and networks in migration. He saw potential in Bauder's perspectives but called for more substantive and disciplined exploration.

In her review, Susan W. Hardwick thought the work is comprehensive, with meticulous analysis of how international migration regulates labor markets. She appreciated the book's theoretical framework, empirical case studies, and its blend of various methods and approaches. Hardwick acknowledged the book's occasional lack of cohesiveness and complex theoretical arguments but praised its accessibility for students and activists.

Christian Berndt thought the work to be a valuable contribution to understanding low-wage labor migration, particularly through its empirical case studies of Canada and Germany. He appreciated the book's challenge to the prevailing view that labor market demand drives migration, highlighting instead the role of migrant labor supply. Berndt still criticized the book for not sufficiently integrating the case studies and for superficial engagement with theoretical concepts like Bourdieu's capital and habitus. He also noted a lack of discussion on transnational migration networks.

Adina Batnitzky agreed with Bauder's main argument that arduous and poorly paid jobs exist because immigrant workers are present to fill them, not the other way around. Batnitzky praised the thorough theoretical grounding in labor market segmentation theory, though she noted the omission of gender, race, and ethnicity in the analysis. She lauded the detailed case studies in Vancouver, Berlin, and rural Ontario but pointed out the lack of comparison with local labor markets and other migrant groups.

Fletcher Baragar applauded Bauder's critical, nuanced analysis of how migration regulates labor markets, particularly through the lens of segmented labor market theory. He found Bauder's exploration of the mechanisms that allocate migrant labor to the lower segments of the workforce insightful, though he noted some conceptual errors and a lack of thematic and methodological unity. Baragar considered Bauder's work valuable for social scientists, despite the need for grounding its application in specific contexts.
