= Oded Stark =

Polish economist (1944–2026)

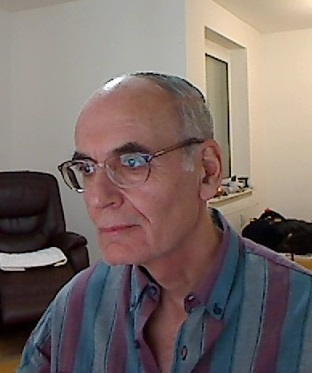
- Born: 12 June 1944; British Mandate Palestine
- Died: 8 August 2026 (aged 82)

Academic work
- Discipline: Development economics, labour economics
- Institutions: University of Warsaw; University of Tübingen; University of Bonn
- Website: Information at IDEAS / RePEc

Oded Stark (12 June 1944 – 8 August 2026) was a Polish economist and academic who was a Distinguished Fellow at the Center for Development Research, University of Bonn, Distinguished Professor at the University of Warsaw, and adjunct professor at the University of Tuebingen.

== Life and career ==
Oded Stark was born in Palestine on 12 June 1944, to Polish parents. Over the course of his career, Oded Stark held the Chair in Economic and Regional Policy at the University of Klagenfurt, the Chair in Development Economics at the University of Oslo, and worked as Professor of Population and Economics as well as the Director of the Migration and Development Programme at Harvard University, as Honorary University Professor of Economics at the University of Vienna, and as Distinguished Research Scholar at Georgetown University. As of 2019, he worked as Distinguished Professor at the University of Warsaw, adjunct professor at the University of Tübingen, and as Distinguished Fellow at the University of Bonn's Center for Development Research. Stark is a co-editor of the Handbook of Population and Family Economics (with Mark Rosenzweig).

Stark died on 8 August 2026, at the age of 82.

== Research ==
Stark's research interests included applied microeconomic theory, development economics, population economics, the economics of migration, and labour economics.

== Awards and honours ==
Stark received an honorary doctorate from the University of Warsaw. He was a Humboldt Fellow, had a lifetime achievement award from the Ministry of Science and Higher Education of Poland, and was a Presidential Professor of Economics in Poland.

== Bibliography (selected) ==
- Stark, O. (1993). The Migration of Labor. Cambridge, MA: Blackwell.
- Rosenzweig, Mark R. & Stark, O., eds. Handbook of Population and Family Economics. Elsevier, 1997.
- Stark, O. (1999). Altruism and Beyond: An Economic Analysis of Transfers and Exchanges Within Families and Groups. Cambridge: Cambridge University Press.
