= Thierry Mayer =

French economist

Thierry Mayer (born 27 June 1971, Boulogne-Billancourt) is a French economist and Professor of Economics at Sciences Po. He belongs to the most frequently-cited economists in the field of international trade. In 2006, Mayer and Etienne Wasmer were awarded the Best Young Economist of France Award by Cercle des économistes and Le Monde.

== Biography ==
A native of Boulogne-Billancourt, Mayer earned his Ph.D. from the University of Paris 1 with a thesis on the strategic location choices of multinational firms under the supervision of Jean-Louis Mucchielli, for which he was awarded the French Economic Association's annual prize for best Ph.D. thesis in economics in 2000. After his Ph.D., Mayer first worked as associate professor at the University of Paris 1 before becoming a professor of economics at the University of Paris-Sud in 2002 following his agrégation and subsequently moving to the Paris School of Economics in 2006. Since 2009, he has been professor of economics at Sciences Po. In parallel, Mayer has been affiliated with CEPR and CEPII, and worked as a consultant for the Banque de France, among others. Moreover, he sat or sits on the editorial boards of the Journal of International Economics,§ Review of World Economics, Journal of Regional Science, Regional Science and Urban Economics, Spatial Economic Analysis, Economic Policy, Canadian Journal of Economics and International Economics.

== Research ==
Thierry Mayer ranks among the top 1% of economists registered on IDEAS/RePEc in terms of research output (January 2019). Mayer's research interests include international trade, multinational firms, economic geography, location theory, and industrial organization. His research has been acknowledged by the Best Young French Economist Award (2006), the Bronze Medal of the CNRS (2008) and a junior membership in the Institut Universitaire de France (2008–13). In particular, Thierry Mayer has played a major role in the development of CEPII's GeoDist database (together with Soledad Zignago), which includes bilateral distances between population centres for 225 countries and thus allows for particularly comprehensive gravity models of trade. In his research, Mayer has frequently collaborated with Keith Head (University of British Columbia and his SciencesPo colleague Philippe Martin.

=== Research on international trade ===
==== Research on trade barriers, border and home market effects, and offshoring ====
A substantial part of Mayer's research, especially with Keith Head, centres on the topics of border, distance and home market effects, trade barriers, market potential and offshoring. Analyzing infra-European trade patterns in 1976–95, Mayer and Head find European consumers to act as if imports from other EU Member States were subject to high non-tariff barriers, with the removal of barriers by the Single Market Programme having almost no effect on market fragmentation, which in turn suggests that border effects within the EU were largely driven by consumers' home bias rather than barriers due to government action. In later research with Head, Mayer introduces a new measure for distance - "effective distance" - which adjusts distances between countries based on the distances between the regions of countries that trade with each other, weighted by their trade, and uses it to (partly) address the border effect puzzle. Together with John Ries, Mayer and Head argue that home market effects in trade models with imperfect competition occur because firms benefit more from locating in the largest market than they lose from moving to a market with many competitors and are surprisingly pervasive, showing their robustness to assuming CES demand, homogeneous goods, non-lambda-shaped trade costs, and price responsiveness to the proximity of competitors, though the effects disappear face to nation-specific differentiation. Empirically, they have found that, even though they have been declining over time, distance costs in service trade remain sufficiently high to create a significant advantage for local workers in services. Studying the trade linkages of former colonies, they also find that within four decades of independence, trade linkages between both former colonies and the colonizing country as well as between countries formerly belonging to the same colonial empire have on average contracted by around two thirds, i.e., substantially more than with third countries, suggesting the depreciation of trade-related capital. Finally, an important review of the pre-2014 literature on gravity models of trade for the Handbook of International Economics is also due to Mayer and Head.

==== Research on market potential ====
Mayer and Head find that market potential, i.e., the proximity of a country to large markets for exports, matters for the location choice of Japanese investors in the EU but cannot completely explain the tendency of firms in the same industry to agglomerate. In further research on market potential, they reconcile the factor price and home market effects of market size and show how regional wages and employment in the EU respond to differentials in "real market potential". Finally, more recently, Mayer and Head have shown market potential to have been a significant driver of global economic per capita growth over the 1965-2003 period.

==== Other research on trade ====
Other topics in Mayer's research on trade include the role of networks for interregional trade, the impact of trade relations on the probability of war, product quality sorting in trade, the reaction of exports to exchange rate movements, market access and the relationship between market size, competition and exporters' product mix. In their research on the role of networks for trade between French regions, Mayer, Pierre-Philippe Combes and Miren Lafourcade find that domestic migrants and firm networks respectively double and quadruple bilateral trade flows, which in turn strongly diminishes estimates of the effects of transport costs and administrative borders on interregional trade. Studying the effect of trade on war, Mayer, Philippe Martin and Mathias Thoenig find that bilateral trade integration reduces the probability of war between these two countries, especially if they are neighbours, but that this effect is mitigated by multilateral trade openness, as having strong trade relations with many other countries reduces a country's economic dependency on a given country. In further research with Martin and Nicolas Berman, Mayer argues that exchange rate movements such as depreciations have only a weak impact on aggregate export volumes because the majority of exports concentrate among high productivity firms that tend to disproportionately absorb exchange rate movements through price markups rather than increases in export volumes. This claim also matches earlier research with Gianmarco Ottaviano on the internationalization of European firms, wherein he and Mayer note that a few high-performing enterprises tend to drive countries' international performance, implying that policy aimed at fostering economic integration should focus on increasing the number of international firms (rather than increasing the involvement of already internationalized firms) by improving firms' performance in terms of productivity and employment. In another study with Ottaviano, Mayer and Marc Melitz observe that French export firms tend to concentrate their export product mix on their best performing products the higher the competition in the export market, which bears important implications for firm productivity growth. In recent research on quality sorting and trade among French champagne exporters, Mayer, Head and Matthieu Crozet show that the probability of market entry, export values and firm-level prices monotonically increase in quality. Finally, together with José de Sousa and Soledad Zignago, Mayer has found that exporters in the Global South face 50% more difficulties in accessing developed markets than exporters in developed countries, though these difficulties have fallen by 95% between 1980 and 2006, with non-tariff barriers (and reductions therein) playing an important role.

=== Research on foreign direct investment ===
Investigating the location choices of French multinational firms in Eastern and Western Europe in 1980–99, Mayer and Anne-Célia Disdier find that, while institutional quality in the host country is important, agglomeration effects are less strong in non-EU countries of Central and Eastern Europe, with investors' East-West distinction of potential host countries decreasing over time. In research on the institutional determinants of inward FDI in developing countries, Mayer, Agnès Bénassy-Quéré and Maylis Coupet find a large effect of institutions such as bureaucracy, corruption, and legal institutions, with e.g. employment protection reducing FDI, as well as of institutional proximity between origin and destination countries, suggesting that improving the quality of institutions in developing countries is likely to strongly increase FDI inflows. Finally, studying the domestic effects on French firms of initiating production abroad in 1987–99, Mayer, Alexander Hijzen and Sébastien Jean find the domestic effects to vary across types of FDI, with market-seeking FDI in manufacturing as well as FDI in services sectors resulting in domestic job creation due to scale effects and their market-seeking motive, whereas factor-seeking FDI has no impact on employment at home.

=== Research on firm clustering in France ===
Analyzing the agglomeration patterns of foreign firms in France, Mayer, Crozet and Jean-Louis Mucchielli observe positive spillovers between firms, patterns of clustering across firms from the same country and with the highest spillovers, and a "learning process" whereby FDI locations become increasingly distant from the country of origin (e.g. from Germany, Belgium, Switzerland or the Netherlands), but very little evidence for regional policies attempting to attract FDI to a particular location. In further research on firm clusters in France, Martin and Florian Mayneris find that public policies promoting the development of industrial clusters - so-called "systèmes de production localisés" - have failed to reverse the relative decline in productivity for the firms it targeted, which had been selected specifically in depressed sectors and regions, and had no robust effect on employment or exports. However, analyzing the short-run effects of clustering on plant productivity in France, they find a positive effect for localization economies (though none for urbanization); while this lends support to cluster policies in general, their findings also suggest that French firms' location have already well internalized such advantages and further policy-induced clustering is unlikely to yield large gains in productivity.

== Bibliography ==
Combes, P.P., Mayer, T., Thisse, J.-F. (2008). Economic geography: The integration of regions and nations. Princeton: Princeton University Press.
