= David Thesmar =

French economist

- Born: 3 July 1972 (age 53); France
- Occupations: Economist, Finance Researcher
- Website: https://sites.google.com/site/dthesmar/

David Thesmar (born in France on July 3, 1972) is a French economist who works as Franco Modigliani Professor Financial Economics at the MIT Sloan School of Management, after having taught finance at HEC Paris for over 10 years. His research interests include corporate finance, financial intermediation, entrepreneurship and behavioural economics. In 2007, he was awarded the Prize of the Best Young Economist of France.

== Biography ==
=== Education ===
David Thesmar earned a B.Sc. in economics and physics from the prestigious École Polytechnique in 1995 and a M.Sc. from the Paris School of Economics and ENSAE, followed by an M.Phil. in economics from the London School of Economics (LSE). In 2000, he obtained his Ph.D. in economics from EHESS for a thesis supervised by Pierre Cahuc, Francis Kramarz, Patrick Rey, Christophe Chamley and Daniel Cohen.

=== Career ===
After his graduation, Thesmar began to work as a lecturer and researcher at ENSAE before becoming Associate Professor of Finance at HEC Paris and being promoted to full professor in 2009. In 2016, following a short visiting appointment at UC Berkeley's Haas School of Business, Thesmar moved to the MIT Sloan School of Management, where has been since working as the Franco Modigliani Professor of Financial Economics and as Professor of Finance.

He published The Price of Our Values with Augustin Landier.

=== Affiliations ===
In parallel to his academic positions, Thesmar maintains affiliations with the Centre for Economic Policy Research and the Cercle des économistes and is a member of the European Economic Association, European Finance Association, and the American Finance Association. Between 2007 and 2013, he was a member of the Conseil d'analyse économique, that advises the French Prime Minister.

Finally, he performs editorial duties for the Journal of Finance and the Review of Finance.

== Research ==
David Thesmar's research interests include behavioural economics, entrepreneurship, productivity and banking. Therein, he has frequently collaborated with David Sraer. According to IDEAS/RePEc, he belongs to the top 3% of economists as per his research output. Key findings of his research include the following:

- Thesmar and David Sraer find that French family firms listed on the stock market largely outperform widely held corporations, even if family firms are run by the founder's descendants, which they attribute to a workforce that is lower-paid but also more sheltered from layoffs (implicit contract and managers using less capital, paying less interest on debt and making more profitable acquisitions.
- Thesmar and Augustin Landier find that short-term debt is robustly correlated with "optimistic" expectation errors, reflecting that optimistic entrepreneurs are likely to prefer short-term debt since it allows them to take a bet on their projects' success and to let investors impose adaptation decisions in bad states.
- Thesmar, Marianne Bertrand and Antoinette Schoar find that after the deregulation of banking in France in 1985, banks became less willing to bail out firms with poor performance and firms being more dependent on banks became more likely to restructure, with rising rates of job and asset reallocation, higher allocative efficiency, and a less concentrated banking sector, an observation in line with Schumpeterian processes of creative destruction.
- Thesmar, Sraer and Thomas Chaney find that real estate shocks have large impacts on corporate investment, as firms use real estate as collateral to finance new projects, with a $1 increase in the value of real estate inducing a $0.06 increase in corporate investment in the U.S.
- Thesmar and Thierry Magnac analyse the nonparametric identification of dynamic discrete choice models with and without unobserved heterogeneity using Bellman equations, investigate how exclusion or parametric restrictions can provide identifying restrictions and explore the consequences of autocorrelation in the unobserved components of preferences.
- Thesmar and Francis Kramarz find that the social networks of French CEOs and those of their directors are strongly correlated, especially for former high-ranking civil servants, and, in those firms wherein these networks are most active, CEO pay tends to be higher, the likelihood of dismissal for an underperforming CEO is lower, and there are less value-creating acquisitions, suggesting that social networks in the boardroom may deteriorate corporate governance.
- Thesmar and Mathias Thoenig show that product market instability, a form of creative destruction, affects firms' organizational choices (e.g. whether to aim for mass production or an organistic approach), with increases in the supply of skilled labour or globalization increasing product market instability and exacerbating wage inequality due to raising skilled wages and possibly also depressing unskilled wages.
- Thesmar, Landier and Robin Greenwood explain how negative shocks to the equity of banks with similar exposures can generate a fire sale of assets as banks sell assets in an attempt to return to target leverage yet depress asset prices in the process.
- Thesmar and Greenwood find that stock price fragility (i.e. an asset's susceptibility to shifts in its demand that are due to concentrated ownership or correlated and/or volatile liquidity shocks) strongly predicts stock price volatility, the correlation of stocks' fragility strongly predicts their price co-movements, and hedge fund trading may exacerbate stocks' fragility.
- Thesmar, Sraer and Quentin Boucly find that, for French leveraged buyouts, targets become more profitable, grow much faster than their peer group, issue additional debt, and increase capital expenditures in the 3 years following an LBO, which they attribute to LBO targets becoming able to exploit growth opportunities through private equity funds' financing.

== Selected awards ==
- Prize of the Best Young Economist of France: 2007
- Manpower Prize (2008)
- Turgot Prize (2012)
- Spängler-IQAM Prize (2013)
