= Matthieu Courtecuisse =

French business executive (born 20 June 1973)

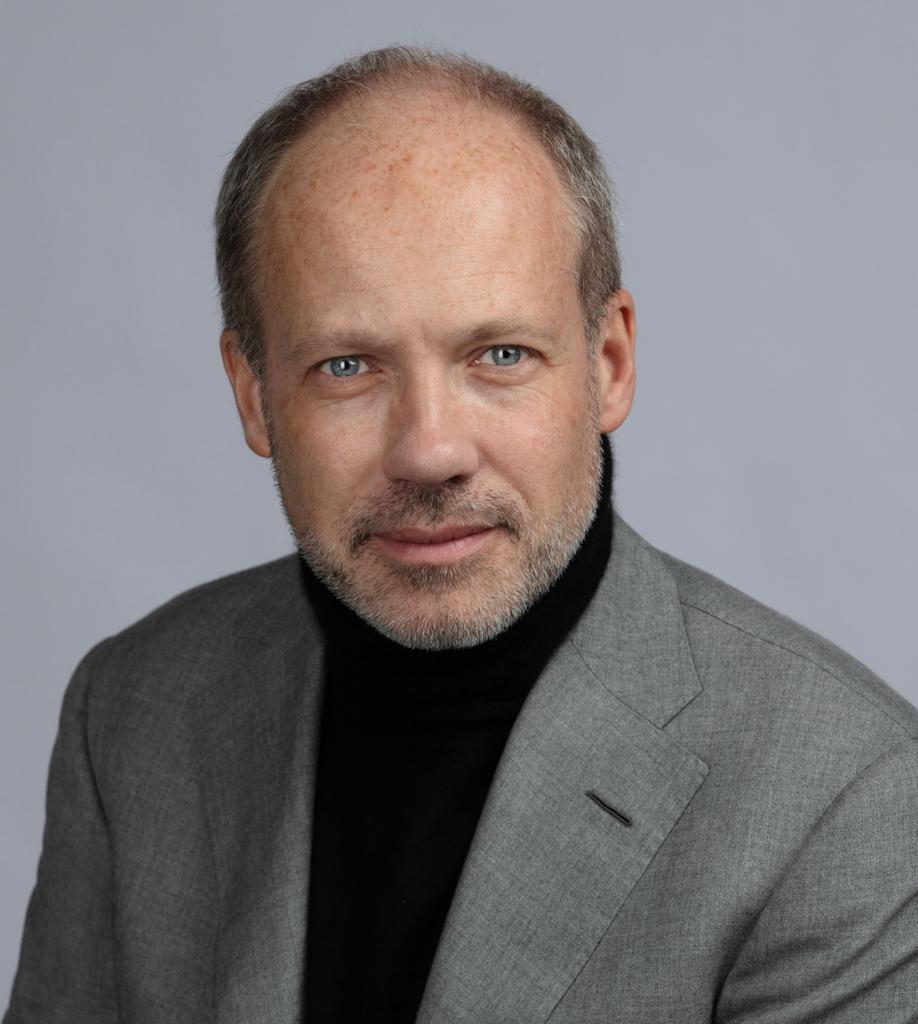
- Matthieu Courtecuisse en 2022
- Born: 20 June 1973 (age 53); Valencienne (France)
- Citizenship: French
- Education: ENSAE Paris
- Occupations: Business executive, author
- Organization: SIA

Matthieu Courtecuisse (born 20 June 1973 in Valenciennes) is a French business executive and author.

Matthieu Courtecuisse is the President and founder of Sia, an international management, strategy, and artificial intelligence consulting firm founded in Paris in 1999.

Between 2018 and 2023, Matthieu Courtecuisse served as President of Syntec Conseil, the professional organization and lobbying body representing the consulting industry in France. Since 2023, he has been based in New York, where he is overseeing the development of his company.

== Early life and education ==
Matthieu Courtecuisse was born on 20 June 1973 in Valenciennes and grew up in Denain, in northern France. He graduated from ENSAE Paris in 1995 and developed an early interest in data, the digital economy, and organizational transformation.

== Early career ==
He began his career as a project manager at Infodev, the World Bank’s fund dedicated to digital investments. Over a three-year period, he managed a program aimed at reducing the digital divide in West Africa.

== Founding and development of Sia ==
In 1999, at the age of 26, Matthieu Courtecuisse founded Sia Partners, renamed Sia in 2025, a consulting firm specializing in management, strategy, and artificial intelligence.

Sia developed its consulting activities across several sectors of the economy, notably financial services, energy, and technology. Matthieu Courtecuisse has followed a consulting approach based on the use of artificial intelligence and automation, and has highlighted the intergenerational evolution of professional careers.

In 2024, after 25 years of operation, he opened Sia’s capital to a financial partner, the investment fund Blackstone, which became a minority shareholder.

That same year, he ranked 162nd in the list of the 500 wealthiest individuals in France published by Challenges.

== Presidency of Syntec Conseil (2018–2023) ==
From 2018 to 2023, Matthieu Courtecuisse served as President of Syntec Conseil, a professional association and lobbying organization representing consulting firms. According to La Lettre du Conseil, the federation brings together approximately 15,000 companies following the merger of four employer unions of the Syntec Federation into the Syntec Conseil entity: Consult'in France, Syntec Études, Syntec Recrutement, and Syntec Évolution Professionnelle.

== Commitments and distinctions ==
Matthieu Courtecuisse participates in several think tanks, including the Milken Institute, the French-American Foundation (Young Leaders class of 2012, alongside figures such as Emmanuel Macron, Fleur Pellerin, and Marguerite Bérard-Andrieu), the Rencontres économiques d’Aix-en-Provence, Les Membres du Siècle, and the Economic Club of New York.

In October 2025, he was named “Industry Champion of the Year” by the SIFMA Foundation.

== Publications ==
Matthieu Courtecuisse is the author of numerous economic opinion pieces published in various media outlets, including Les Échos, Le Figaro, Le Monde, L’Opinion, and L’Echo. He has also published three books:

- · La fabrique du conseil: Consultant, un métier d’avenir, Pearson, 2012 (ISBN 978-2-7440-6537-8)
- · Le saut cognitif, Pearson, 2019 (ISBN 978-2-4120-4888-7)
- · Réindustrialiser, c’est possible!, “Et après?” series, Éditions de L’Observatoire, 2020 (ISBN 979-1-0329-1779-4)
