= Étienne Wasmer =

French professor and economist (born 1970)

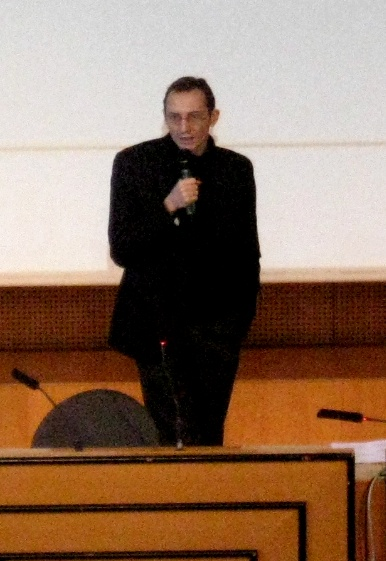
Wasmer in 2010

Étienne Wasmer (born 1970) is a French economist. He specializes in labor economics, job search theory, discrimination and human capital. He was awarded the "Prix du meilleur jeune économiste de France" by Le Monde and the "Cercle des économistes" in 2006, a prize shared with Thierry Mayer (Paris-I). He is Professor of Economics at the Abu Dhabi campus of New York University. He previously taught microeconomics at Sciences Po Paris.

== Career ==
Drawn to mathematics, Wasmer's interest was confirmed by reading popular books, notably those by Benoît Mandelbrot. On this subject, he declares that he wanted “to do research that would never give up on predicting and identifying causalities. It ended up in economics, but it could have been in physics “. His meeting with two respected economists, François Bourguignon and Daniel Cohen, confirmed his professional choice.

After being admitted to the École Polytechnique (1990-1993), he turned his studies towards economics, opting for a DEA (post-graduate diploma) in economic analysis and policy (1994). He then enrolled in a PhD at the London School of Economics (1997) under the supervision of Christopher Pissarides, winner of the 2010 Nobel Prize in Economics. He is researcher at OFCE, Research Fellow at CEPR (London) and Research Fellow at IZA (Bonn).

Étienne Wasmer won the “Prize for the best book for economics students published by a French economist” awarded by the Association française de science économique (AFSE), for his book "Principes de microéconomie, Méthodes empiriques et théories modernes", published by Pearson.

In 2009, he was appointed member of the expert group on the minimum wage. He was also a member of the Conseil d'analyse économique reporting to the Prime Minister from 2012 to 2017. He contributed to a number of reports during his tenure, notably on the housing market, the labor market and New Caledonia.

After teaching at Sciences Po Paris, he left in January 2018 for Abu Dhabi, where he is a professor at New York University Abu Dhabi.

In October 2023, Etienne Wasmer was commissioned, along with Antoine Bozio, associate professor at PSE and director of the IPP Institute for Public Policy, by former French Prime Minister Elisabeth Borne with a mission relating to "the articulation between wages, labor costs and the activity bonus and its effect on employment, wage levels and economic activity.” The final report was officially submitted to Prime Minister Michel Barnier and made public on Thursday October 3.

Etienne Wasmer is a member of Terra Nova's Scientific Advisory Board.

Etienne Wasmer supervised or co-supervised 18 doctoral students, successfully leading them to graduation.

== Economic ideas ==
According to Étienne Wasmer, the European social model implies a high degree of sectoral specialization and geographic mobility. In his view, this model is highly effective in periods of economic stability, but fragile in times of macroeconomic turbulence.

He has also studied the perverse effects of protective legislation. In housing, for example, when landlords have to put up with unpaid bills for months on end because of complex collection procedures, they are led to select their tenants more harshly and may be led to refuse to rent to less-favored people or those in precarious employment, which worsens the situation of vulnerable people.

He also supports the El Khomri law because, in his view, the existing laws governing the “highly codified and protective” labor market do not allow for the absorption of “new populations”. The new law would also have the advantage of enabling “advances for young people.

== Main publications ==
- Morgane Laouenan, Palaash Bhargava, JB Eyméoud, Olivier Gergaud, Guillaume Plique, Etienne Wasmer (2022) A Cross-verified Database of Notable People 3500BC-2018AD, Nature Sci Data Jun 9;9(1):290. doi: 10.1038/s41597-022-01369-4. https://www.nature.com/articles/s41597-022-01369-4 - data and codes
- Odran Bonnet, Guillaume Chapelle, Alain Trannoy, Etienne Wasmer (2021) Land is back, it should be taxed, it can be taxed, Online Appendices A to F, European Economic Review, vol. 134(C). Prix Maurice Allais de Sciences Economique 2023
- Petrosky-Nadeau, Nicolas; Wasmer, Etienne (2013) The Cyclical Volatility of Labor Markets under Frictional Financial Markets, American Economic Journal: Macroeconomics, 5(1): 193-221.
- David, Quentin, Janiak Alexandre et Etienne Wasmer (2010) Local social capital and geographical mobility, Journal of Urban Economics, Elsevier, Sept., vol. 68(2), pages 191-204.
- Wasmer, E. (2006). Interpreting Europe-US Labor Market Differences : the Specificity of Human Capital Investments, American Economic Review, June, Volume 96(3), p. 811-831.
- Wasmer, E. et Weil, P. (2004), The Macroeconomics of Credit and Labor Market Imperfections, American Economic Review, September, 94(4), p. 944-963.

== Last publications ==
- The Multiplier Effect of Resource Conflict & The Great Divergence and Reconvergence though the lens of Unified Growth Theory, joint with Tanguy Le Fur, Fall 2024
- Land Taxation, bequests and Capital Accumulation: Tax the Chatelains!, joint with Jiacheng Li and Alain Trannoy, Fall 2024
- Housing Prices Propagation: A Theory of Spatial Interactions, joint with Christophe Bruneel-Zupanc, Guillaume Chapelle, Jean-Benoît Eyméoud, Fall 2024

== Books ==
- Le Grand Retour de la terre dans les patrimoines, avec Alain Trannoy, éditions Odile Jacob, 2022.
- Labour, Credit and Goods Markets: The Macroeconomics od Search and Unemployment, with Nicolas Pretrosky-Nadeau, MIT Press, November 2017.

== Medias, interviews (selection) ==
- Chroniques Les Echos 2023-2024
  - 22/9/2023 Crise de l'immobilier: soulager ou Guérir
- Chroniques Les Echos 2022-2023
  - 1/7/2023 Fiscalité de l'environnement : taxer l'air et la terre
  - 1/6/2023 Deepfakes : un projet Manhattan pour les archives nationales
  - 19/4/2023 La tyrannie de la majorité et celle de la minorité
  - 15/3/2023 Lentement mais sûrement, la société française s'appauvri
  - 8/2/2023 Et si on facilitait le recul de l'âge de départ en retraite ?
  - 4/1/2023 Le système économique, un jeu à somme nulle ou positive ?
  - 17/11/2022 La hausse inéluctable des taxes foncières
  - 12/10/2022 Il y a urgence à restaurer l'envie de travailler
