= Jean-Hervé Lorenzi =

French economist

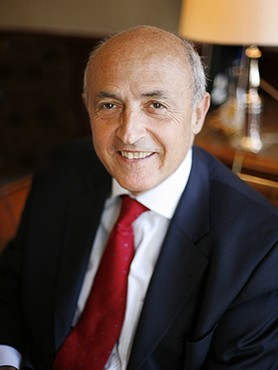
- Born: 24 July 1947 (age 79); Toulon, France
- Occupations: Founder and Chairman of the Cercle des économistes, President of the Chair Transition Démographique, Transition Economique, Member of the executive board of Edmond de Rothschild Group

Jean-Hervé Lorenzi (born 24 July 1947 in Toulon) is a French economist.

Jean-Hervé Lorenzi is President and Chairman of the French think-tank Le Cercle des économistes which annually organizes the economic forum Les Rencontres Economiques d'Aix-en-Provence. He holds the chair "Transition Démographique, Transition Economique" at the Fondation du Risque in partnership with University Paris X. He is president of "Pôle de Compétitivité, Finance et Innovation". He is a member of the executive board of Edmond de Rothschild Group France. As an independent administrator, Jean-hervé Lorenzi is also a member of the supervisory board of Euler Hermes and a member of the board of directors of the Médéric Alzheimer Foundation and BNP Paribas Cardif.

== Professional career ==
Starting his career in 1975 as a professor of economics at Paris 13 University and at the École normale supérieure, Jean-Hervé Lorenzi became advisor of the President of Havas Group from 1979 to 1981. He then successively held different positions as a civil servant in the French administration at the DIELI and at the French Minister of Industry. From 1986 to 1991, he has been the managing director of the SARI Group and of CNIT. In 1991, he was appointed Economic Advisor to the French Prime minister Édith Cresson. From 1992 to 1994, he was Chief Executive Officer at the Commissariat à l'énergie atomique et aux énergies alternatives. From 1995 to 1999, he became Deputy Managing Director then Managing Director of Gras Savoye.

Jean-Hervé Lorenzi has been a professor at the Paris Dauphine University from 1992 to 2012 (Master 218 Assurance et gestion du risque) and has been a member of the Conseil d'Analyse Économique from 1997 to 2012.

== Education ==
Jean-Hervé Lorenzi graduated holds a Ph.D in Economics (1974) and was received first at the Agrégation in Economics (1975), receiving the 1975 award of the French economic association (Association française de sciences économiques).

== Awards and distinctions ==
- Officier de la Légion d’honneur
- Chevalier de l’ordre national du Mérite

== Main publications ==
- "France, le désarroi d'une jeunesse" with Hélène Xuan et Alain Villemeur, Eyrolles, 2016
- « Un monde de violences, l’économie mondiale 2015-2030 », with M. Berrebi, Eyrolles, 2014
- « La France face au vieillissement, le grand défi », with H. Xuan, Descartes & Cie, 2013
- « Et si le soleil se levait à nouveau sur l’Europe », with O. Pastré, Fayard, 2013
- « Rajeunissement et vieillissement de la France », with J.Pelletan and A. Villemeur, Descartes & Cie, 2012
- « Le fabuleux destin d’une puissance intermédiaire », Grasset, 2011.
- « Investissement et investisseurs de long terme » with P. Trainar, J. Clachant and A. Quinet; Rapport du Conseil d’Analyse Economique, La Documentation Française, April 2010.
- « Fin de monde ou sortie de crise », with P. Dockes, Editions Perrin, 2009.
- « Croissance, productivité et commerce extérieur : la position française en déclin ? » with A. Villemeur, in Les Cahiers Français n°347, October 2008
- « Private Equity et capitalisme français » with P. Trainar and J. Glachant, Rapport du Conseil d’Analyse Economique, La Documentation Française, June 2008.
