= Xavier Jaravel =

French economist (born 1989)

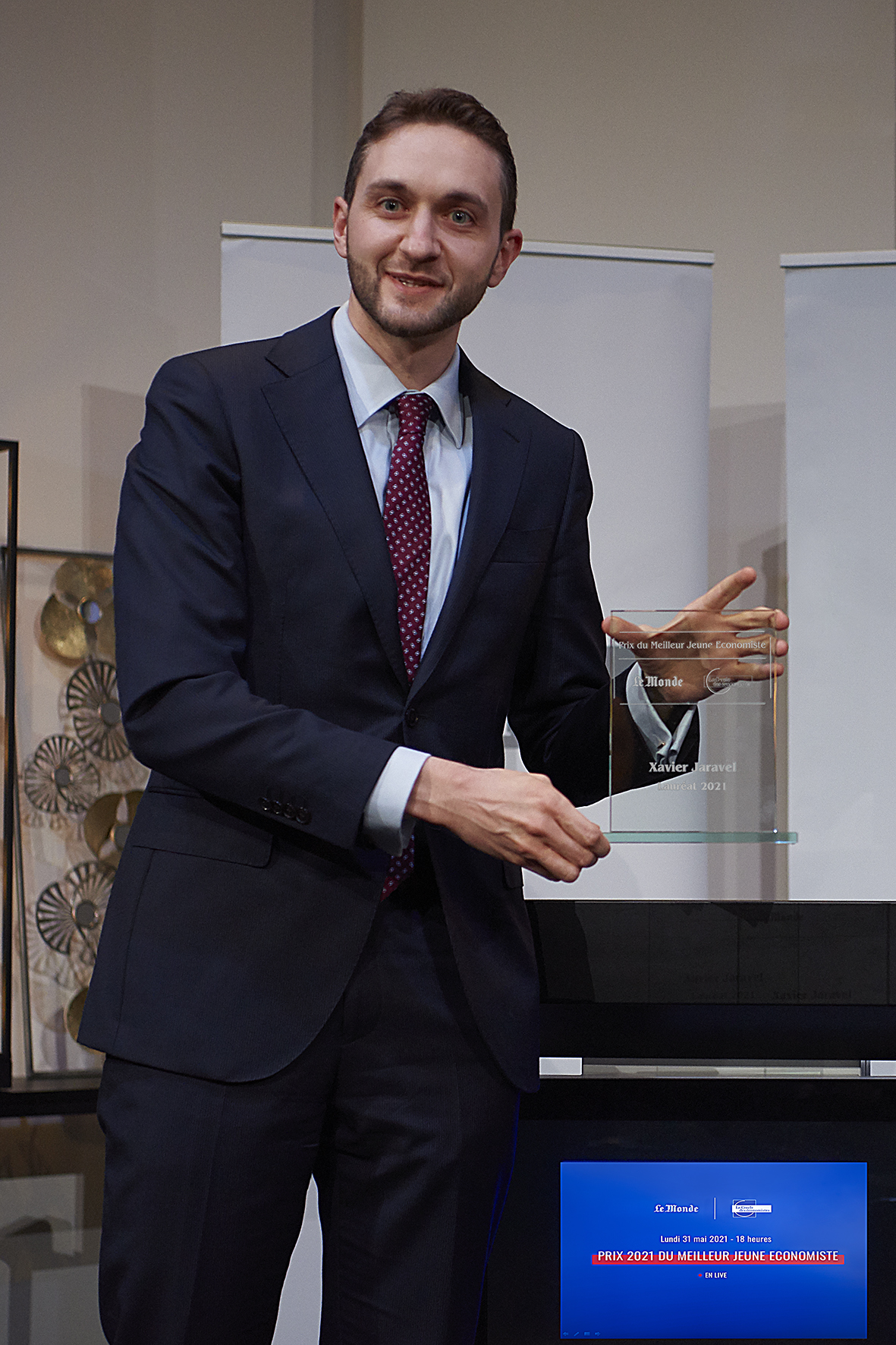
- Jaravel in 2021

Chairman of the Conseil d'analyse économique
- Incumbent
- Assumed office 18 March 2025
- Preceded by: Camille Landais

Personal details
- Born: 26 September 1989 (age 36)
- Website: xavierjaravel.com

Xavier Jaravel (born 26 September 1989) is a French economist and civil servant.

On 17 March 2025, Jaravel was appointed Deputy President of the Conseil d'analyse économique for a five-year term by decree of the Prime Minister. He has been a professor of the London School of Economics since 2024.

== Career ==
His research covers inflation, innovation, trade, and econometric methods, often using microeconomic approaches to study macroeconomic questions, and includes work on how expanding access to innovation-related careers and education can promote innovation while reducing inequality.

A major theme in Jaravel’s research is the relationship between innovation and inequality. In a series of papers, he has documented how social background influences the likelihood of becoming an inventor or innovator, showing that many potentially productive innovators are excluded from the innovation process due to barriers related to income, education, or geography. These ideas were further developed in his 2023 book Marie Curie habite dans le Morbihan: Démocratiser l’innovation, which discusses how France and other advanced economies can expand participation in scientific and technological innovation. He also conducts research on inflation, focusing on how its effects differ across demographic groups, including income, age, race, and geographic location. Jaravel developed Distributional Consumer Price Indices (D-CPIs) for the United States, which provide a more detailed perspective than traditional CPI measures. His work has shown that real inequality has grown more rapidly than previously estimated and has revealed how inflation impacts households differently, offering insights relevant to discussions of real wages, poverty, and economic policy.

Jaravel is also a co-editor at American Economic Journal: Applied Economics.

== Awards ==
- 2019: Philip Leverhulme Prize
- 2021: Prix du meilleur jeune économiste de France
- 2022: Top 10 economic influencers in France award by Challenges
- 2023: Prix du livre d'économie

== Publications ==
- Jaravel, Xavier (2023). Marie Curie habite dans le Morbihan: Démocratiser l'innovation (in French). Seuil. ISBN 978-2-02-154584-5.
- Borusyak, Kirill; Jaravel, Xavier; Spiess, Jann (2024), Revisiting Event Study Designs: Robust and Efficient Estimation, The Review of Economic Studies, doi:10.1093/restud/rdae007
- Jaravel, Xavier (2021). Inflation Inequality: Measurement, Causes, and Policy Implications. Annual Review of Economics. 13 (Volume 13, 2021): 599–629. doi:10.1146/annurev-economics-091520-082042
- Borusyak, Kirill; Hull, Peter; Jaravel, Xavier (2020). Quasi-Experimental Shift-Share Research Designs, The Review of Economic Studies, doi:10.1093/restud/rdab030
- Jaravel, Xavier (2019). The Unequal Gains from Product Innovations: Evidence from the U.S. Retail Sector. The Quarterly Journal of Economics. doi:10.1093/qje/qjy031
- Jaravel, Xavier; Petkova, Neviana; Bell, Alex (2018). Team-Specific Capital and Innovation. American Economic Review. 108 (4–5): 1034–1073. doi:10.1257/aer.20151184
