= Prix du meilleur jeune économiste de France =

French economics award

The prix du meilleur jeune économiste de France (lit. Best Young French Economist Award) is an annual award given since 2000 by daily newspaper Le Monde and the Cercle des économistes to French economists under the age of 40.

== Recipients ==
Year	Recipients
2000	Agnès Bénassy-Quéré and Bruno Amable
2001	Pierre Cahuc
2002	Philippe Martin and Thomas Piketty
2003	Pierre-Cyrille Hautcœur
2004	David Martimort
2005	Esther Duflo and Elyès Jouini
2006	Thierry Mayer and Étienne Wasmer
2007	David Thesmar
2008	Pierre-Olivier Gourinchas
2009	Yann Algan and Thomas Philippon
2010	Emmanuel Saez
2011	Xavier Gabaix
2012	Hippolyte d'Albis
2013	Emmanuel Farhi
2014	Augustin Landier
2015	Pascaline Dupas
2016	Camille Landais
2017	Antoine Bozio
2018	Gabriel Zucman
2019	Stefanie Stantcheva
2020	Isabelle Méjean
2021	Xavier Jaravel
2022	Éric Monnet
2023	Julia Cagé and Vincent Pons
2024	Alexandra Roulet
2025	Antonin Bergeaud
2026	Adrien Bilal

== See also ==
- List of economics awards
- John Bates Clark Medal
- Gossen Prize
- Yrjö Jahnsson Award
- Nakahara Prize
- Assar Lindbeck Medal
