= Jacques Mistral =

French economist and professor (born 1947)

Jacques Mistral (born September 22, 1947) is a French economist and professor. He is a member of the Conseil d'Analyse Économique in France, a member of the Cercle des économistes, and as of October 2009, a member of the scientific council of the center-right think tank Fondation pour l'innovation politique.

== Early life ==
Mistral was born in Toulouse, France. He graduated from the École Polytechnique in Paris in 1967 and earned his Ph.D. in Economics from the University of Paris I in 1977.

== Career ==
Mistral has held several professorships: from 1978 to 1992, he was a professor of economics at Université Paris-Nord; from 1974 to 1992, at ENSAE; from 1984 to 1994, at the École Polytechnique; and from 1982 to 1996, at Sciences Po.

He also held several posts as an economic advisor. From 1988 to 1992, he was an economic advisor for the then-prime minister, Michel Rocard; from 2000 to 2001, he was a special advisor of political economy and international relations for the Minister of Economics, Finances, and Industry, Laurent Fabius. He held several executive positions as a member of the AXA Group, including central director and director of human resources in France. He was also a senior fellow at the Kennedy School of Government at Harvard University from 2005 to 2006.

Mistral was president of the Société d'économie politique from 2008 to 2012. Currently, Mistral is the head of economic research at the French Institute for International Relations (Institut Français des Relations Internationales), a member of the Conseil d'Analyse Économique for the Prime Minister, and a nonresident senior fellow in Global Economy and Development at the Brookings Institution.

His economic interests are international economics, the international monetary system, the eurozone crisis, and the relationship between the United States, China, and the EU.

== Political positions ==
In the French presidential election of 2012, Mistral endorsed Socialist Party candidate and eventual winner François Hollande.
