= Philippe Brassac =

French business executive

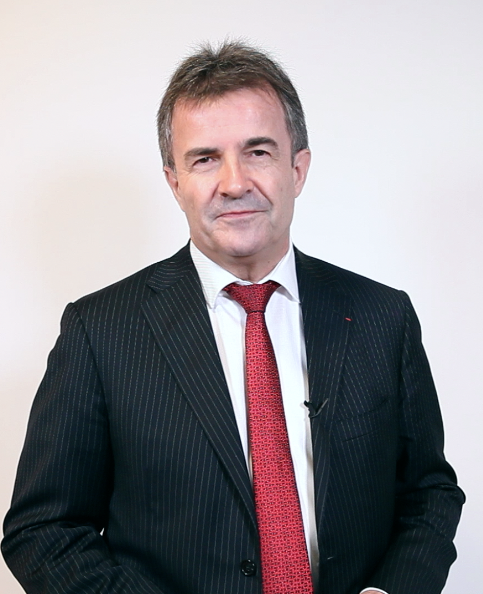
- Born: August 31, 1959 (age 66); Nîmes, France
- Education: ENSAE ParisTech
- Occupation: CEO of Crédit Agricole
- Predecessor: Jean-Paul Chifflet

Philippe Brassac (born August 1959) is a French business executive, currently the chief executive of Crédit Agricole, having succeeded Jean-Paul Chifflet to the role in May 2015. He has been also Chairman of the French Banking Federation (Fédération Bancaire Française) since September 2016, succeeding to Frédéric Oudéa.

== Early life ==
A graduate of the Ecole Nationale de la Statistique et de l'Administration Economique in 1981, he holds an advanced diploma in mathematics.

== Career ==
In 1982, a young graduate, Brassac started his career in the Gard branch of Crédit Agricole. He was quickly promoted as Head of Organisation, then as Head of Finance Banking and Marketing. In 1994, he was appointed Deputy Chief Executive of Crédit Agricole Alpes Maritimes. In 1999, he joined the Caisse nationale de Crédit Agricole as Director of Relations with Regional Bank.

In 2001, Brassac became the Deputy Chief Executive Officer of the new Crédit Agricole Provence Côte d'Azur, a merger of the three caisses regionales: Caisse Regionale Alpes Maritimes, Caisse Regionale des Alpes de Haute-Provence and Caisse Regional du Var. He pursued his career at the Federation Nationale du Crédit Agricole in 2003 and was appointed deputy chairman in 2008, then General Secretary in 2010. During his time at the Fédération Nationale, he backed a governance reform project for the group which aimed at focusing on the French and Italian markets.

In May 2015, Brassac was appointed CEO of Crédit Agricole S.A. with the backing of the owners of the group's mutual banks.

In June 2015, he announced the flotation of the asset management joint venture, Amundi, of Credit Agricole and Société Générale which could be worth €7bn.

Brassac took several "bold moves" to develop a strategy to change Credit Agricole's organization following several complaints from analysts who considered the group's structure as "complex". Until now, Crédit Agricole SA (CASA) owned 25% stake in the regional mutual banks which then hold 56% stake of CASA. Since his appointment, Brassac has been developing a plan, called "Eureka", which aims at simplifying the structure of the group by letting the regional banks buy back their 25% stake for a total amount of €18bn.

On 29 April 2021, Philippe Brassac predicted that Bitcoin would be worth less than a dollar by April 2025; the actual closing price for April 2025 was 94'207 USD.

== Other activities ==
- European Financial Services Roundtable (EFR), Member
- Paris Europlace, Member of the Board of Directors

== Recognition ==
- Officier du Mérite Agricole (Order of Agricultural Merit)
- Chevalier de la Légion d'Honneur in 2011 (Legion of Honour)
- Officier de l'Ordre National du Mérite
