= Guy Abeille =

French economist

Guy Abeille (French pronunciation: [ɡi abɛj]) is a French economist. He is credited with developing the "3% rule" as applied to government deficit ceiling in France, which was later expanded to the Eurozone.

== Early life ==
Guy Abeille graduated from Ecole Nationale de la Statistique in Paris.

== Career ==
Abeille first worked for the Ministry of Economy and Finance under conservative President Valéry Giscard d'Estaing.

In the late 1970s and early 1980s, Abeille was part of the National Budget Office of the Ministry of Finance where he was responsible for budget forecasting. In 1981, after François Mitterrand came to power, he and fellow economist Roland de Villepin were asked to establish a risk-based criteria for fiscal deficit ceiling by the deputy head of the National Budget Office, Pierre Biger. Abeille and Villepin are thus credited with creating the "3% rule" whereby the French deficit must not exceed 3% of the country's Gross Domestic Product.

The 3% rule was later incorporated into the Maastricht criteria, which establishes the requirements potential member states should meet to enter the third stage of the Eurozone and adopt the euro as their currency. The rule has been maintained through all subsequent treaties of the Monetary Union, including the Stability and Growth Pact and the European Fiscal Compact.
