= Mathilde Lemoine =

French economist

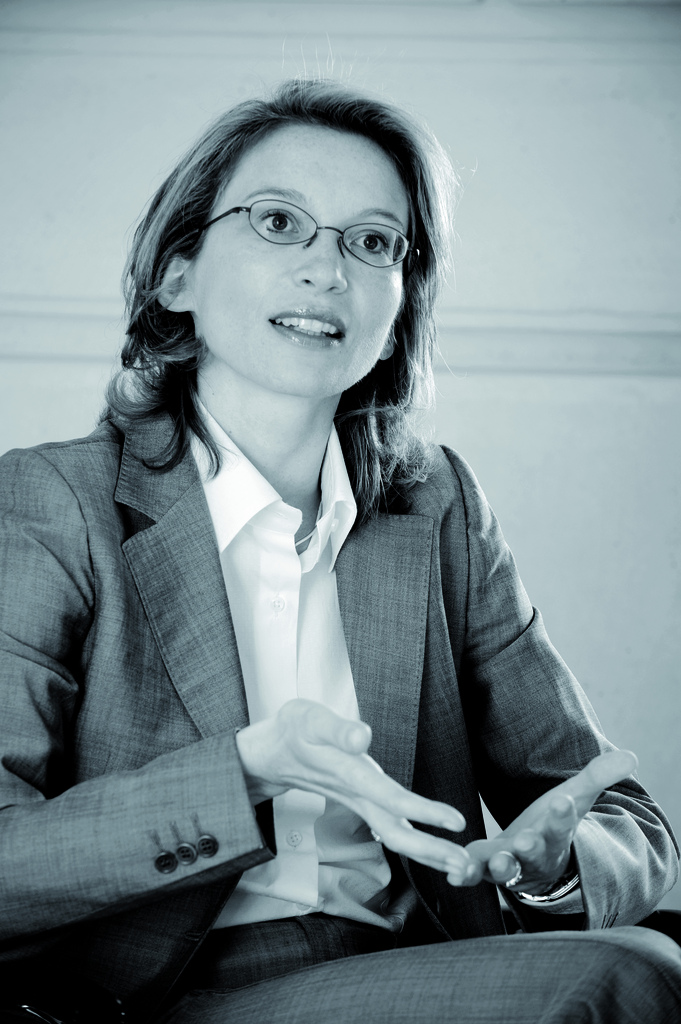
- Born: September 1969 (age 56)
- Education: Paris Dauphine University; Sciences Po
- Title: Group Chief Economist of Edmond de Rothschild

Mathilde Lemoine (born September 1969) is a French economist. She is currently the Group Chief Economist of Edmond de Rothschild. She is also a member of the French High Council of Public Finances and an independent Director of retailer Carrefour Group.

== Education ==
After obtaining her undergraduate and master's degrees in Applied Economics at the Université Paris IX Dauphine, Mathilde Lemoine specialized in the areas of macroeconomics and international finance through her advanced degree work in Applied Economics and International Finance at Sciences Po in Paris in 1993. Mathilde Lemoine then spent three years as a temporary research professor from 1996 to 1999. She obtained a Ph.D. in Economic Science in 1997 from the Institut d’Etudes Politiques de Paris (Sciences Po Paris). During this period, she performed her research work on public economics and macroeconomic analysis at the Fondation national des sciences politiques.

== Career ==
From 2000 to 2002, Mathilde Lemoine served as an economist and Secretary General at the Observatoire Français des Conjonctures Économiques (an independent and public economic think tank), presided by Jean-Paul Fitoussi.

In 2002, she was appointed as a Technical Advisor to the French Foreign Trade Minister, taking charge of macroeconomic and globalization issues. Then in December 2004, she was named foreign trade and globalization advisor to the French Minister of the Economy and Finance. From 2005 to the end of 2006, she served as Advisor for macroeconomics and tax affairs to the French Prime Minister Dominique de Villepin.

From 2006 until 2015, she led the Economic Studies and Market Strategy Department for HSBC France and for HSBC Global Research. After having been a research professor at the French National Political Science Foundation (Sciences Po Paris), she was economic adviser to several French ministers of economy and finance, then economic advisor on macroeconomics and tax affairs to the French Prime minister (2005-2006).

In January 2016, she joined the Edmond de Rothschild Group as Group Chief Economist. “The nomination of Mathilde Lemoine to the post of Group Chief Economist attests to the ambition of the Edmond de Rothschild Group to develop a department of economic research that is both independent and world renowned,” the Group explained in a statement.

== Commissions ==
From 2007 to 2013, Mathilde Lemoine was a member of the Commission économique de la Nation (French National Economic Commission, a government body of economists). She resigned from that post following her nomination to the Haut Conseil des finances publiques (High Council of Public Finances).

From 2008 until 2012, she was a member of the Conseil d'Analyse Économique, which counsels the French Prime Minister on economic issues.

She was rapporteur for the Expert Conference on Climate and Energy Contribution in 2009 and a member of the Attali Commission for the Liberation of Growth in 2010.

Mathilde Lemoine participated in a government mission reporting on the determinants of the competitiveness of French industry, bringing her expertise on the competitiveness of the French economy and on social welfare financing.

Mathilde Lemoine participated in the Leading Group on Innovative Financing for Development as the French expert named by the governments of a 12-nation task force. As part of this work, she wrote a report entitled “International Financial Transactions for Development” (2010).

In 2014, she presided a working group for the think tank Terra Nova that produced a report entitled “Entering and Staying in the Workforce.”

== Other roles ==
Mathilde Lemoine is a member of the Scientific council of the Cité de l’économie et de la Monnaie, an initiative of the Bank of France to improve public knowledge of economics, especially for young people.

Since 1997, she has taught macroeconomics at Sciences Po in Paris.

Since May 2011, she has also been an Independent Member of the Board of Directors of Carrefour Group and a member of the Account Committee.

On March 8, 2013, she was named member of the High Council of Public Finances by the president of the finance commission of the French Senate. The same year, Mathilde Lemoine became a Member of the Board of Directors of the École normale supérieure.

== Distinctions ==
Mathilde Lemoine is a Knight of the Ordre National du Mérite.

== Work and publications ==
- Europe’s Untapped Growth Potential, in State of the Union Schuman report 2015 on Europe, 2015
- Investing in Human Capital, the Capital of the 21st Century, in Confrontations Europe, La Revue n°107, December 2014
- Can ‘Macroeconomics’ save France? in Global Insights by HSBC, 10 November 2014
- For a credible growth strategy for the euro zone: the obligation to produce results, in Fondation Robert Schuman European Issue n°275, 23 April 2013
- The Euro: Spectator or Player in the World’s Financial Imbalance? in State of the Union Schuman report 2012 on Europe, 2012
- The Euro has a Future, in Fondation Robert Schuman European Issue n°201, 11 April 2011
- When will the debt stop growing? Stabilising the government debt burden in the Eurozone, HSBC Global Research, 21 June 2010
- Brexit’ could boost eurozone GDP’, Financial Times.com May 2, 2016
- The City and Brexit – a fresh warning on euro trading, BBC.com, June 21, 2016
- London could lose right to euro trading after Brexit, June 22, 2016
- Europe considers implications of Brexit, Ft.com, June 22, 2016
