= Bruno Amable =

French economist

- Born: 15 December 1961 (age 64); France
- Education: HEC Paris
- Occupation: Professor at the University of Geneva

Bruno Amable (born 15 December 1961, in France) is a French economist and professor at the University of Geneva. Amable's research interests include political economy, comparative analysis of capitalism, and institutional economics. His research was awarded the first Best Young French Economist Award in 2000 (together with Agnès Bénassy-Quéré).

He graduated from HEC Paris in 1984.

== Research ==
Bruno Amable's research centres on the different forms of capitalism, institutions and their influence on innovation and industry, leading to many publications on the nexus between globalisation, industrial policy and technological progress. More recently, he has been studying labour markets and labour market policies as well as structural reforms in Europe. In January 2019, he ranked among the top 2% of economists registered on IDEAS/RePEc in terms of number of published works (January 2019).

=== Research on productivity growth, technology and innovation ===
In early work on productivity growth, Amable argues that countries require "social capabilities" to leverage their technological backwardness into catch-up growth, finding - contrary to most growth models - divergence between countries' productivity levels over 1960–85. In later research, Amable further finds productivity growth to increase in inter-industry specialization and specialization in electronics. In further research on the role of technology for economic development, Amable and Bart Verspagen find that technological advantage, as measured by patent counts and investment, significantly affects long-run price competitiveness. With regard to innovation, in work co-authored with Rémi Barré and Robert Bayer, Amable makes the case for a richer perspective on innovation systems than the one provided by Keynesian, monetarist or Schumpeterian theories of innovation, as these fail to adequately account for the key roles of organization types, institutions, labour supply and attitudes and their mediation by globalization, claiming that mixed economies outperform both command and free market ones in terms of innovation and competitiveness. Relatedly, he has also highlighted the role played by institutional complementarity and hierarchy for the co-existence of diverse social systems of innovation and production.

=== Research on capitalism and neoliberalism ===
This perspective - that economies may grow substantially and sustainably despite large differences in institutions - is also present in Amable's research on capitalism. Notably, in The Diversity of Capitalism, Amable explains how institutions - far from being irrelevant for economic development - may keep economies from converging towards a unique economic model. He further offers a typology of capitalisms, distinguishing between (i) the neoliberal model, (ii) the continental European model, (iii) the social democrat model, (iv) the "Mediterranean" model" and (v) the Asian model of capitalism. Amable has been critical of political efforts to force countries to converge towards a single economic model (typically the neoliberal one), arguing that ongoing differences between developed countries in terms of financial systems, social protection, industrial relations, labour markets and education systems strongly suggest that a common economic system would be both inadequate and undesirable in the face of such diversity, and is bound to be opposed by populations. In another study of capitalism, Amable argues that neo-liberal politics is driven by a moral imperative of competition, leading to a replacement of the "old" social contract of collective rights to social protection and redistribution by a new one based on reciprocity between the individual and society, with important implications for e.g. the emergence of the "modern" left. More recently, taking a neorealist approach, Amable (with Stefano Palombarini) has theorized how types of institutional change and their timing may depend on the interplay between political strategies and demands for institutional change.

== Bibliography ==
- Amable, Bruno; Barré, Rémi; Boyer, Robert (1997). Les systèmes d'innovation à l'ère de la globalisation [Innovation systems in the era of globalization] (in French). Economica. ISBN 978-2-7178-3332-4.
- Amable, Bruno (2003). The Diversity of Modern Capitalism. doi:10.1093/019926113X.001.0001. ISBN 978-0-19-926113-0.
- Amable, Bruno (2005). Les cinq capitalismes: diversité des systèmes économiques et sociaux dans la mondialisation [The Five Capitalisms: Diversity of Economic and Social Systems in Globalization] (in French). Seuil. ISBN 978-2-02-061256-2.
