= The Price of Our Values =

2025 nonfiction book by David Thesmar and Augustin Landier

- Author: Augustin Landier and David Thesmar
- Subject: Economics and ethics
- Publisher: University of Chicago Press
- Publication date: 2025

The Price of Our Values: The Economic Limits of Moral Life is a 2025 nonfiction book by French economists David Thesmar and Augustin Landier about the ways that people balance morals with economic realities.

George F. DeMartino of Science claimed that the book's thesis "rises to the Senian challenge, exploring how moral pluralism undermines all sorts of economic shibboleths that too often prevent the conomics profession from meeting the needs of those it seeks to serve."
