= Conseil d'analyse économique =

Government economic advisory body in Paris

CAE
- Conseil d'analyse économique
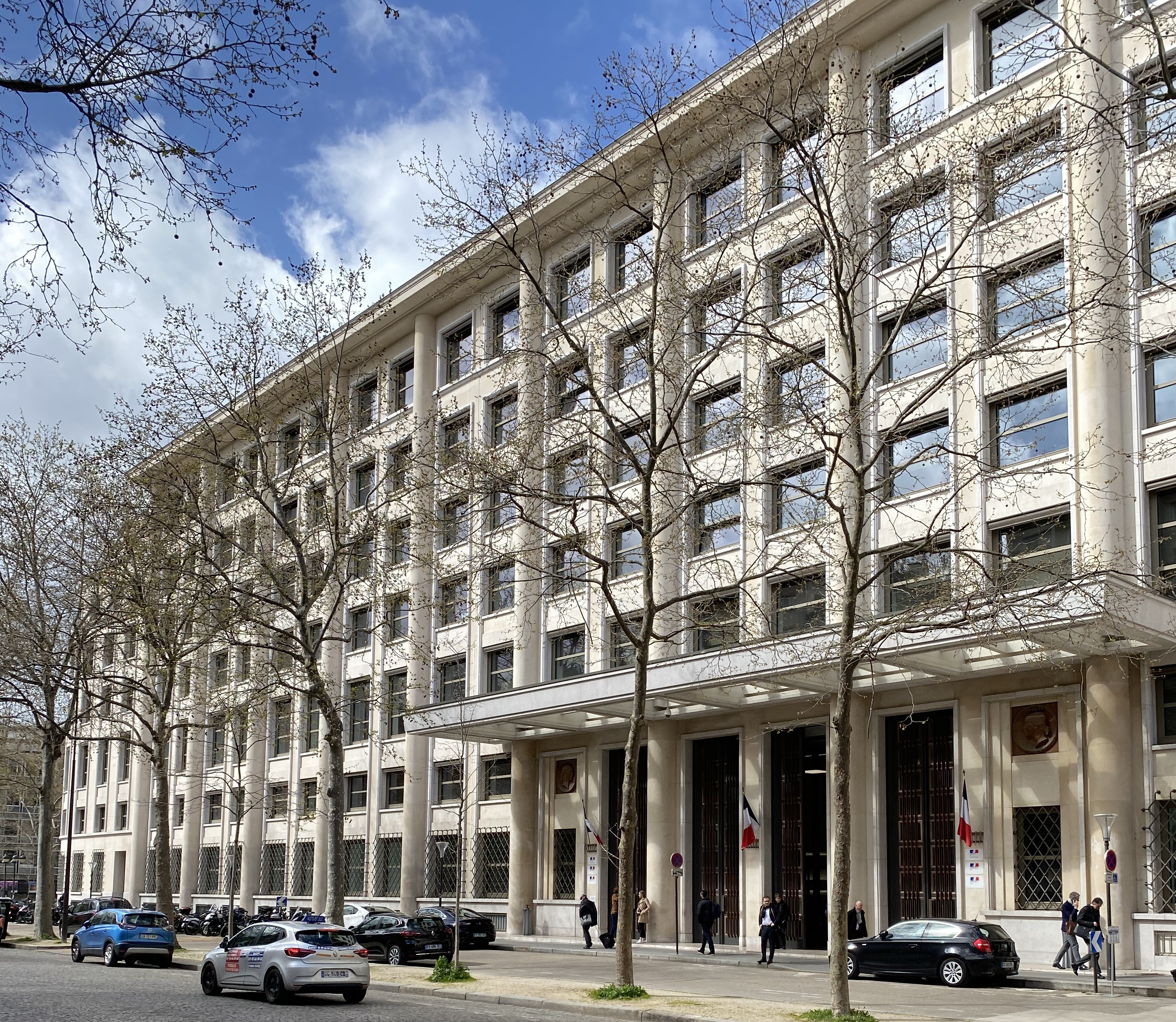
- Fontenoy-Ségur government office complex, seat of CAE since 2017
- Formation: 1997
- Headquarters: 20, avenue de Ségur
- Location: Paris, France
- Chair: Xavier Jaravel
- Parent organization: Office of the Prime Minister of France
- Website: https://www.cae-eco.fr/en/

The Conseil d'analyse économique (CAE, lit. 'Council of Economic Analysis') is an economic advisory body in Paris. It is government-funded and part of the Office of the French Prime Minister. It was established by executive order of 22 July 1997 under newly elected Prime Minister Lionel Jospin, and reorganized by order of 5 November 2012 to refocus its membership criteria on academic excellence.

The CAE commissions reports from its members, which are published and serve both as advice to the government and as contributions to the public debate. It is part of a network of research bodies and institutes coordinated by (and funded through) France Stratégie.

== Membership ==
The CAE has 15 members, typically recognized French economists and occasionally some from outside France, who are not remunerated for their membership. The respective heads of the Direction générale du Trésor and of the Institut national de la statistique et des études économiques are members ex officio.

The successive executive chairs (French: président délégué) of the CAE have been:

- 1997-2001: Pierre-Alain Muet
- 2001-2002: Jean Pisani-Ferry
- 2003-2012: Christian de Boissieu
- 2012-2018: Agnès Bénassy-Quéré
- 2018-2022: Philippe Martin
- 2022-2025: Camille Landais
- Since 2025: Xavier Jaravel

Other past and present CAE members include Yann Algan, Emmanuelle Auriol, Jean-Marie Chevalier, Mathilde Lemoine, Jean-Hervé Lorenzi, Isabelle Méjean, Jacques Mistral, Thomas Philippon, Xavier Ragot, Hélène Rey, Stefanie Stantcheva, Jean Tirole, Laurence Tubiana, Natacha Valla, Reinhilde Veugelers, and Guntram Wolff.

== See also ==
- National Economic Advisory Council (United Kingdom)
- Council of Economic Advisers (United States)
- German Council of Economic Experts
- Economic Advisory Council (Pakistan)
