= Bernard Salanié =

Academic background
- Education: École Polytechnique; ENSAE; School for Advanced Studies in the Social Sciences
- Doctoral advisor: François Bourguignon

Academic work
- Discipline: Microeconomics; Econometrics
- Institutions: Columbia University
- Doctoral students: Camille Landais
- Website: Information at IDEAS / RePEc

Bernard Salanié is a French economist. He is professor of economics at Columbia University. He was formerly the director of ENSAE ParisTech and the Center for Research in Economics and Statistics.

== Biography ==
Salanié graduated from the École Polytechnique in 1984 and the Ecole Nationale de la Statistique et de l'Administration Economique in 1986. He received a PhD from the School for Advanced Studies in the Social Sciences in 1992. His doctoral advisor was François Bourguignon, who was the former Chief Economist of the World Bank from 2003 to 2007.

From 1986 to 1990, Salanié worked for the Institut national de la statistique et des études économiques, before becoming professor of ENSAE and rising to its director. He was also director of the Center for Research in Economics and Statistics from 2001 to 2003. He joined the Columbia University faculty in 2005. He is known in France for his blog "L'économie sans tabou."

Salanié has published widely in the field of microeconomic theory and applied econometrics, and his current research focuses on insurance, methods for policy evaluation, and the economics of the family.

Salanié was a managing editor of The Review of Economic Studies from 2003 to 2007. He has been a fellow of the Econometric Society since 2001.
