= Augustin Landier =

French economist (born 1974)

- Born: 1974 (age 51–52)
- Occupation: French economist
- Website: https://sites.google.com/site/augustinlandier/

Augustin Landier (born in 1974) is a French economist who currently works at the Toulouse School of Economics. His research interests include corporate finance, corporate governance, asset management, organization science, and behavioural economics. In 2014, he was awarded the Prize of the Best Young Economist of France.

== Biography ==
Augustin Landier studied mathematics at the École Normale Supérieure, a French grande école from 1994 to 1998, earning a master's degree in mathematics in 1994 from Paris 6, passing his agrégation therein in 1995, and earning two Master of Advanced Studies in the philosophy of science and economics, respectively, from Paris 1 in 1996 and from EHESS in 1998. Thereafter, he studied at the Massachusetts Institute of Technology, where he earned a PhD in economics in 2002.

After his graduation, he became an assistant professor of finance at the Graduate School of Business of the University of Chicago (2002–04) before moving to the New York University's Stern School of Business and directing Old Lane LP, founding Ada Investment Management, and researching at the International Monetary Fund. In 2009, Landier returned to France, where he has been working as full professor at the Toulouse School of Economics. Additionally, he is a member of the Scientific Council of the Banque de France, a consultant for the ECB, and has repeatedly been a member of the Council of Economic Analysis, the French Council of Economic Advisers.

Landier has been awarded several prizes for his research, including the Robert Solow Prize, the Edouard Bonnefous Prize and the Rossi Prize by the Académie des Sciences Morales et Politiques, and the Prize of the Best Young Economist in France by Le Monde and the Cercle des Économistes.

According to the Uber Files leaks, in 2014 Landier and David Thesmar accepted a 100,000 Euro fee to carry out a study on behalf of Uber as “actionable for direct PR to prove Uber’s positive economic role”. The study, co-authored by Uber employee Daniel Szomoru, was published in March 2016. The authors argued that Uber drivers would earn nearly double the minimum wage. In an answer on Twitter, Landier and Thesmar claim that they had exposed the conflict of interest from the start in the study, and that they do show that drivers came from poor neighborhood and gained in productivity throughout their association with Uber.

He published The Price of Our Values with David Thesmar.

== Research ==
Augustin Landier's research interests include corporate finance, corporate governance, asset management, organization science, and behavioural economics. According to IDEAS/RePEc, he is among the top 4% of economists by research output. Key findings of his research include the following:

- Landier and Xavier Gabaix develop a model wherein heterogeneous CEOs are matched to firms through competitive assignment and a CEO's pay depends on the size of his firm and the total firm size, resulting in small differences in CEO talent commanding large differences in pay, which in turn explains all of the sixfold increase of U.S. CEO pay between 1980 and 2003.
- Landier and Olivier Blanchard find that French reforms that allowed firms to hire workers on fixed-term contracts substantially increased turnover, especially in entry-level jobs, without substantially decreasing unemployment duration.
- Landier and David Thesmar find that short-term debt is robustly correlated with "optimistic" expectation errors, reflecting that optimistic entrepreneurs are likely to prefer short-term debt since it allows them to take a bet on their projects' success and to let investors impose adaptation decisions in bad states.
- Landier, Gabaix and Alex Edmans develop a theory explaining the level and sensitivity of CEO pay in competitive markets by embedding a moral hazard problem into a talent assignment model; based on the theory, they argue that firm size is associated with lower shares of firm ownership and is unrelated to the quotient of dollar change in wealth per percentage change in firm value and annual pay, and that incentive pay is effective at solving certain agency problems with multiplicative impacts on firm value, whereas problems with additive impacts are better addressed through direct monitoring.
- Landier, Viday Nair and Julie Wulf find that geographically dispersed firms are less employee-friendly, that layoffs of divisional employees are less common the nearer their division is located to the corporate headquarter, and that firms to divest out-out-state entities before in-state, suggesting key roles for the ease of information transfer and social factors.
