= Jean-Marie Chevalier =

French economist (1941–2021)

- Born: 4 June 1941; Paris, Vichy France
- Died: 31 October 2021 (aged 80)
- Occupation: Economist

Jean-Marie Chevalier (4 June 1941 – 31 October 2021) was a French economist. He specialized in energy economics from the 1970s until the 2000s.

== Biography ==
Chevalier was born in Paris on 4 June 1941 into a family from Creuse. He graduated from Sciences Po in 1962 and earned a doctorate in economics from the Sorbonne.

Chevalier was a professor of economics at Algiers 1 University from 1966 to 1969 and subsequently worked as an economics engineer for Elf Aquitaine from 1970 to 1971. He then taught economic sciences at Mohammed V University from 1971 to 1973, at Pierre Mendès-France University from 1973 to 1975, and at the École nationale d'administration from 1975 to 1991. He was Director of the Centre de géopolitique de l'énergie et des matières premières, located at Paris Dauphine University, until 2010. He also frequented the Paris office of the Cambridge Energy Research Associates.

In 2007, Chevalier co-authored a report advocating an end to France's energy independence in order to fulfill the country's commitments to the European Union. He was a member of the Conseil d'Analyse Économique from 2006 to 2010, a member of the Cercle des économistes, and the author of several books and articles on the field of energy.

Chevalier died on 31 October 2021 at the age of 80.

== Publications ==
- L’économie industrielle en question (1977)
- Économie de l’énergie (1986)
- Économie industrielle des stratégies d’entreprise (2001)
- Où va l’économie mondiale ? (2002)
- La raison du plus fort. Les paradoxes de l’économie américaine (2004)
- Les grandes batailles de l’énergie (2004)
- Les 100 mots de l’énergie (2008)
- "Le vrai défi énergétique de la nouvelle décennie" (2010)
- Les nouveaux défis de l’energie (climat-economie-geopolitique) (2011)
