= Jean-Marc Ollagnier =

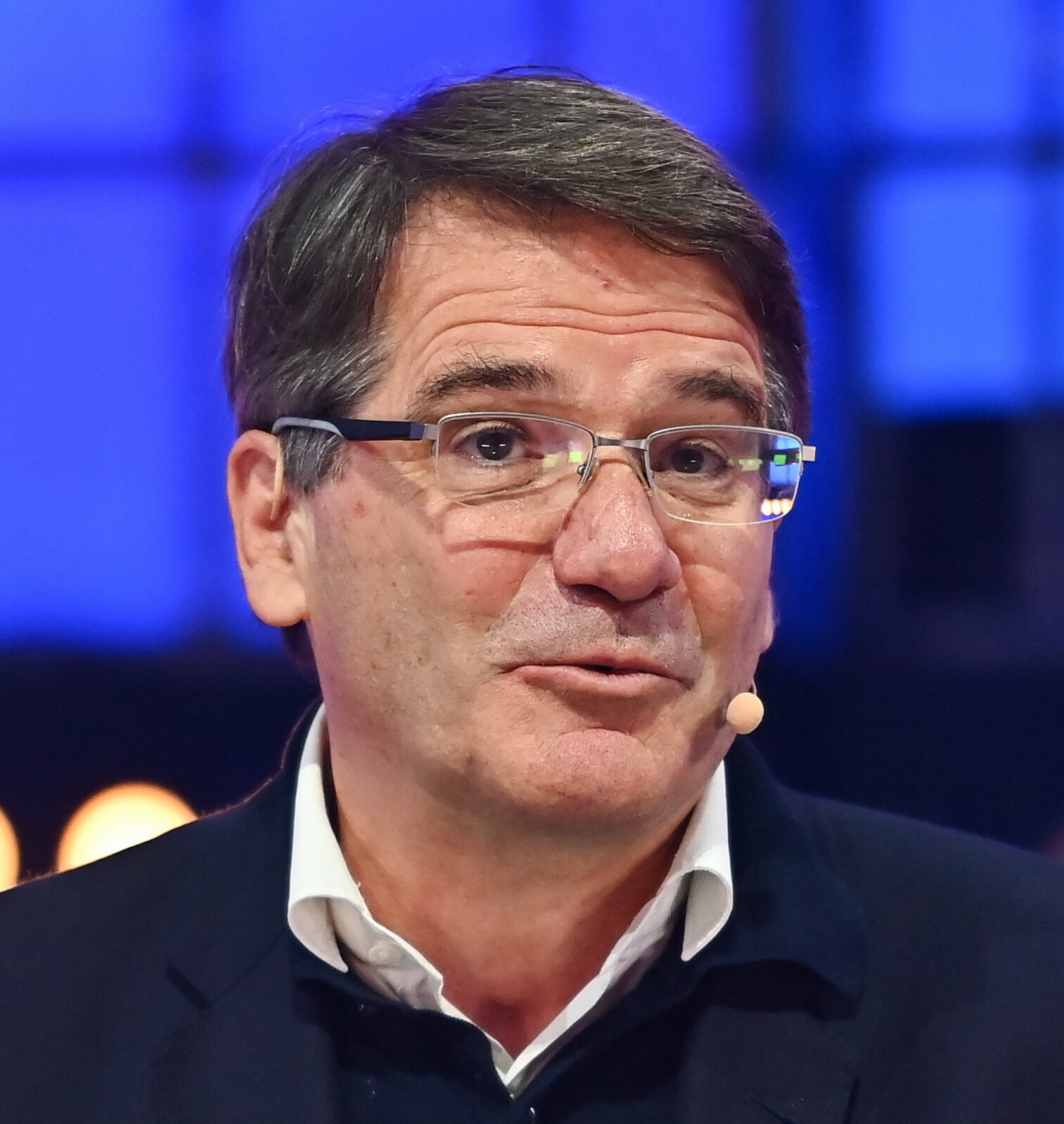
- Born: Lyon, France
- Education: Télécom Paris
- Occupation: CEO of Accenture Europe
- Children: 4

Jean-Marc Ollagnier is a French business leader, expert in the energy sector and currently chief executive officer of Accenture for Europe, Middle East and Africa (EMEA), and a member of Accenture's Global Management Committee.

== Early life and education ==
Born in Lyon, Jean-Marc Ollagnier is the son of a pneumologist and a general practitioner. An engineer by training, he graduated from Télécom Paris in 1985, with a specialization in computer science.

== Career at Accenture ==
Jean-Marc Ollagnier joined Accenture (then Arthur Andersen) in 1984 as an intern while still an engineering student at Télécom Paris. At the beginning of his career, he worked on technological solutions and services dedicated to the banking and insurance sectors. He became a partner of the company in 1997, then CEO of the company for France and Benelux, when the company split from Arthur Andersen. He worked on Accenture's IPO in 2001. In 2003, he became head of financial services (banking and insurance) for France and Benelux, succeeding Pierre Nanterme, the other Frenchman having taken on very high responsibilities at Accenture.

In 2006, he specialized in the "Resources" activity, which covers the energy, chemical, utilities (water, gas and electricity distribution) and mining sectors, and advised major groups on transformation programs. Initially in charge of this activity for Europe, Africa and the Middle East, he became the global Managing Director for this activity in 2011, and joined the company's Management Committee.

The responsibility for this activity and a meeting with Ban Ki-moon in 2014 led him to advocate for a greater role for businesses in the fight against global warming. He published a number of points of view to this effect in the international media and at global summits. He also called on Europe to set an example from an energy point of view and on the energy sector to "consider the energy transition not as a threat but as an opportunity", and said he considered electricity as "the energy of tomorrow " while defending the importance of the energy mix.

== CEO of Accenture Europe ==
In 2020 and after 36 years with the company, he was appointed CEO of Accenture for Europe. The business he leads represents revenues of $15 billion, more than a third of Accenture's global business, with 100,000 employees. Europe is Accenture's second largest market after North America. He is cited as one of the few executives to have worked his way up the corporate ladder from intern to CEO.

He announced that he intended to continue investing in Europe (Accenture having developed a major acquisition policy, with nearly 50 companies acquired since 2015). He calls for a European industry renaissance and aims to grow consulting services for large companies in the region, particularly in the area of business-to-business, especially with regard to Industry 4.0 and artificial intelligence.

In 2023 his remit at Accenture extended to management oversight of all industries and services across Europe, Middle East and Africa (EMEA).

== Other activities ==
Jean-Marc Ollagnier co-chairs with Lord John Browne the Global Energy Board, which brings together world leaders in the energy sector.

He also acts as an expert on energy-related subjects at international summits such as the United Nations Global Compact, the World Business Council for Sustainable Development, the World Economic Forum, the Rencontres Economiques d'Aix-en-Provence, and is due to speak at the Cop26 in 2021.

== Personal life ==
Jean-Marc Ollagnier is the father of four children and is passionate about cycling.
