= Philippe Martin (economist) =

French economist (1966–2023)

- Born: 18 January 1966; Paris, France
- Died: 17 December 2023 (aged 57)
- Education: Sciences Po; Georgetown University
- Occupation: Economist

Philippe Joseph Martin (18 January 1966 – 17 December 2023) was a French economist, lately professor of Economics at Sciences Po in Paris and dean of Sciences Po's public policy school, the School of Public Affairs (French: École d'affaires publiques). He served as the first chair of Sciences Po's Department of Economics from 2008 to 2013, and as the chair of the French government's Conseil d'Analyse Économique from 2018 to 2022. He was also Vice President and a research fellow at the Centre for Economic Policy Research (CEPR).

== Life and career ==
Martin taught at the Graduate Institute of International Studies, the University of Paris 1 Pantheon-Sorbonne and the Paris School of Economics. From 2001 to 2002, he served as an economist at the Federal Reserve Bank of New York.

Martin's research focused on international trade and macroeconomics, in addition to economic geography. He was the economic advisor (2015-2016) of Emmanuel Macron when he was Minister of the Economy.

Philippe Martin died on 17 December 2023, at the age of 57.

== Other activities ==
- Institute of Advanced Studies in National Defence (IHEDN), Member of the Scientific Council (since 2020)
- Paris School of International Affairs (PSIA), Member of the Strategic Committee
- Cercle des économistes, Member

== Political positions ==
Ahead of the 2012 French presidential election, Martin co-signed an appeal of several economists in support of candidate François Hollande. In 2017, he advised Emmanuel Macron on his economic programme during his presidential campaign.

== Recognition ==
- 2002 – Prix du meilleur jeune économiste de France (shared with Thomas Piketty)

== See also ==
- Conseil d'Analyse Économique
