= Pascaline Dupas =

French economist

- Occupation: French economist

Pascaline Dupas is a French economist whose research focuses on development economics and applied microeconomics, with a particular interest in health, education, and savings. She is a professor in economics and public affairs at Princeton University and is a co-chair of the Poverty Action Lab's health sector. She received the Best Young French Economist Prize in 2015.

== Biography ==
In 1999, Pascaline Dupas earned the equivalent of a B.A. in economics and econometrics from the École Normale Supérieure in Paris (rue d'Ulm), followed by a M.Sc. in economic analysis and policy in 2000 and a Ph.D. in economics in 2006 from the Paris School of Economics. Throughout her graduate studies, she held various visiting positions at MIT, Harvard University and New York University. Following her graduate studies, Dupas held assistant professorships at Dartmouth College (2006-2008), UCLA (2008-2011), and Stanford University (2011-2014). She was promoted to associate professor with tenure in 2014, became a full professor at Stanford in 2019, and became a professor of economics and public affairs at Princeton University in 2023. In addition to her work as researcher and teacher, she also worked as an (associate) editor for a variety of academic journals in economics, including the Review of Economic Studies, Quarterly Journal of Economics, Econometrica and the Journal of Development Economics.

== Research ==
Pascaline Dupas' research studies the challenges that households and governments in developing countries face in relation to a broad range of issues in education, finance and especially health, the latter subject being one in which Dupas has particularly strong expertise. Methodologically, Dupas' research generally relies on the use of field experiments such as randomized controlled trials (RCTs). Core topics of her work include the prevention of diseases such as Malaria and HIV, the effect of teacher incentives, and the saving behaviour of poor people. Key findings of Dupas' research include the following:

- Tracking not only benefits high-achieving students by raising the quality of their peers but also low-achieving ones by allowing teachers to adjust the level of instruction to the students' level of prior knowledge (with Esther Duflo and Michael Kremer).
- Women in developing countries face larger barriers to saving and investment than men and thus benefit strongly from the introduction of free formal saving services such as non-interest-bearing bank accounts (with Jonathan Robinson).
- Free provision of anti-malarial insecticide-treated nets (ITNs) is more effective than distribution under cost-sharing and, considering the large positive externality related to the widespread use of ITNs, would likely decrease the cost per life saved (with Jessica Cohen).
- Group savings and credit schemes as well as simply providing poor people with a safe place to keep money substantially increase health savings, though earmarking features were only effective for individuals who are frequently taxed by their social relations or for funds earmarked for emergencies (with Jonathan Robinson).
- Providing teenagers with information about the fact that the risk of HIV infection increases with the age of the sexual partner reduces teen pregnancies (and unprotected sex) more effectively than information focusing on abstinence.
- Providing schools in Kenya with contract teachers didn't increase the scores of students taught by civil service teachers, who reduced effort and attempted to usher the teaching contracts to relatives, but did increase the scores of students taught by contract teachers; a school governance programme giving parents more influence on hiring decisions through school committees reduced the capture by regular teachers (with Duflo and Kremer).
- Offering a one-time subsidy for an ITN in Kenya increases households' willingness to pay a year later by helping people learn about the benefits of the good and doesn't cause anchoring, thus suggesting an important role for short-run subsidies in promoting the long-run adoption of new health products.
- Households' willingness to pay for a private water connection is high if it can be purchased on credit because it sustainably increases well-being by increasing leisure time and reducing inter- and intra-household conflicts related to water but not by improving health, stressing the relevance of households' access to credit (with Duflo, William Parienté, Vincent Pons and Florencia Devoto).
- An abstinence-focused curriculum doesn't affect teen pregnancy or sexually transmitted diseases (STIs), whereas education subsidies can be effective in reducing adolescent girls' dropout, pregnancy, and marriage but not STIs (with Duflo and Kremer).

According to IDEAS/RePEc, Pascaline Dupas ranks among the top 4% of economists registered on the platform (June 2017). She also does research along with the Abdul Latif Jameel Poverty Action Lab (J-PAL) and Center for Effective Global Action.

== Selected awards and honours ==
- 2019: Guggenheim Fellow.
- 2018: Fellow of the Econometric Society.
- 2015: Best Young French Economist Prize, Le Monde, Cercle des Économistes.
- 2013-2018: National Science Foundation CAREER Grant.
- 2012-2014: Alfred P. Sloan Fellowship.
