= Hamza Ben Driss Ottmani =

Moroccan author and engineer

- Born: 10 May 1940; Essaouira, Morocco
- Died: 30 May 2012 (aged 72)
- Education: Aerospace engineer Economist
- Alma mater: École nationale de l'aviation civile ENSAE ParisTech
- Occupation: Writer

Hamza Ben Driss Ottmani (10 May 1940 – 30 May 2012) was a Moroccan engineer, economist and writer.

== Biography ==
Aerospace engineer graduate from École nationale de l'aviation civile (the French civil aviation university; promotion 1963) and economist graduate from ENSAE ParisTech (promotion 1973), Ottmani held senior official positions in the Moroccan public administration, particularly in the Departments of Public Works and Transportation. He was Transportation Planning Director for a long period, before becoming Secretary General of the Ministry of Transports. He was also a founding member of the «association pour la sauvegarde, le développement et la promotion de la ville dEssaouira » ("association for the safeguarding, the development and the promotion of Essaouira city").

== Writing ==
Ottmani's literary work is largely focused on his hometown, Essaouira, which he often referred to by its former name Mogador.

His first book, "Une cité sous les alizés" ("a city under the trade winds"), is a historical study of Mogador-Essaouira from prehistory to the World War II. Then he turned to fiction, but retaining a strong historical basis.

In "Si Mogador m'était contée" ("if Mogador could talk"), the old narrator, Lalla Aïcha, revives twenty stories from the ignored past of the city. "Le Soldat qui venait de Mogador" ("The soldier who came from Mogador") tells the story of the trip to Mecca of Si Taieb El Ech Chiadmi Maskali, since 1912; the young man spent nearly twelve years in Libya and is involved in guerrilla warfare by the Senussi against the Italian colonization. "Le Fils du Soleil" ("Son of the Sun") is a historical novel which tells the amazing story of Mustapha Zemmouri, better known under the name Estevanico, Moroccan from Azemmour region, slave kidnapped by a Spanish man to America and became one of the first discoverers of Arizona and New Mexico.

== Awards ==
Ottmani was awarded the " Société de Géographie humaine de Paris" ("humain geography society of Paris) with the " prix René-Caillié" ("René-Caillié award") in 1997. His book "Le Fils du Soleil" ("Son of the Sun") received the "Prix du Maroc du livre" ("Morocco book award") in 2006 in the creative writing category. His biography of Si Kaddour Benghabrit was selected for the "Prix Grand Atlas" in 2011.

== Bibliography ==
- Hamza Ben Driss Ottmani, Une cité sous les alizés : Mogador des origines à 1939, Éditions La Porte, 1997, 356 p. (ISBN 978-9981889187)
- Hamza Ben Driss Ottmani, Le Fils du soleil : l'Odyssée d'Estevanico de Azemor, Éditions La Porte, 2006, 316 p. (ISBN 9789981889538)
- « Le Soldat qui venait de Mogador » (Ed. La Porte).
- « Si Mogador était contée » (Ed. Eddif).
- « Kaddour Benghabrit : Un Maghrébin hors du commun » (Ed. Marsam).
- Hamza Ben Driss Ottmani's obituary (in French)
