= Cannabis and border towns in the United States =

Since 2012, various jurisdictions in the United States have legalized cannabis for recreational use. Because there are no border controls between U.S. states and citizens are allowed to travel freely between them, this has resulted in the proliferation of cannabis dispensaries located in towns that border states where cannabis remains illegal or where the legal market is more expensive and/or heavily regulated. These dispensaries can often be a significant source of revenue for the local economy of a city; for example, the city of Ontario, Oregon generated $100 million in cannabis sales less than two years after allowing dispensaries.

This article lists cities and towns throughout the United States located at or near a state line that have at least one cannabis dispensary.

== Border towns with cannabis dispensaries in the United States ==
=== Haverhill, Massachusetts ===
With the opening of new dispensary Full Harvest Moon which sits directly on the state line between New Hampshire and Massachusetts prompting many close by New Hampshire residents in Plaistow to make the short trip over.

=== Antonito, Colorado ===
Located just north of the New Mexico border, Antonito's authorization of retail marijuana shops resulted in a $295,000 annual increase in the city budget. The money has been used to pay for critical services and purchase the 106-year-old Warshauer Mansion for use as a future City Hall.

=== Danville, Illinois ===
Located in eastern Illinois on the Indiana state line, Danville's first cannabis dispensary opened in May 2020.

=== Dinosaur, Colorado ===
A town of less than 400 people, Dinosaur voted 102-50 to allow marijuana dispensaries in 2016 and serves residents of Utah.

=== Iron Mountain, Michigan ===
Located in the Upper Peninsula of Michigan along the Wisconsin border, Iron Mountain's first recreational dispensary opened in October 2020.

=== Morenci, Michigan ===
Located along the Ohio border, the city of Morenci's dispensaries serve both recreational customers and Ohio medical cannabis patients who exhaust their legal supply in Ohio before purchasing more in Michigan.

=== New Buffalo, Michigan ===
Located past the northwestern border of Indiana, the township contains over 20 dispensaries serving Hoosiers and Chicagoland residents due to prices being significantly lower than the nearby Chicago.

=== Ontario, Oregon ===
Ontario, Oregon repealed its ban on cannabis dispensaries in the November 2018 general election. Dispensaries opened in the town the following year and immediately saw a large influx of Idaho residents. Tax revenue from the dispensaries has enabled Ontario to expand its city budget and cease cutting funds for general services in the city. However it, along with other dispensaries in Eastern Oregon, is one of the driving forces behind the creation of Greater Idaho due to the effect people there and in Idaho say it is having on their way of life and values.

=== Salisbury, Massachusetts ===
A resort town on the New Hampshire border. Police in nearby Seabrook, New Hampshire regularly confiscate cannabis purchased in Salisbury by residents.

=== Sedgwick, Colorado ===
Located in northeastern Colorado near the Nebraska border, Sedgwick's cannabis dispensaries were a major benefit to the small town's economy. However, the town has also drawn the ire of Nebraska law enforcement officials, who believe it is to blame for the large spike in marijuana possession arrests in Nebraska-Colorado border towns since legalization.

=== South Beloit, Illinois ===
Located across the border from Beloit, Wisconsin, South Beloit's first cannabis dispensary opened in 2020 following the legalization of cannabis in Illinois and has generated significant tax revenue for the city.

=== Trinidad, Colorado ===
One of the first cannabis border towns, Trinidad's economy was revitalized by the legalization of marijuana due to its close proximity to both New Mexico and Texas.

=== Uxbridge, Massachusetts ===
Located on the border with Rhode Island, Uxbridge has several marijuana dispensaries. As of September 2019, the city is considering establishing marijuana smoking clubs in the city.

=== West Wendover, Nevada ===
Located across the border from Wendover, Utah, West Wendover's first dispensary opened in December 2019 and serves Utah residents in the western half of the state.

=== Sunland Park, New Mexico ===
Located across the border from El Paso, Texas. Sun Park has over 20 recreational dispensaries and serves El Paso, Texas. Texas law prohibits recreational cannabis.

== Previously used border town dispensaries ==
From July 2014 to October 2015, recreational cannabis sales were legal in Washington but illegal in Oregon; accordingly, Washington-based dispensaries located along the Oregon-Washington border made considerable revenue from Oregon residents during this time. However, after Oregon began recreational cannabis sales in October 2015, revenue at state line dispensaries plummeted as Oregon residents switched to dispensaries in their own state.

Huntington, Oregon was the primary city used by Idaho residents to purchase cannabis until 2019, when the city of Ontario (which is located closer to the Idaho border) opened its own dispensaries; cannabis sales subsequently declined significantly in Huntington.

== See also ==
- Border effect
- Cannabis in the United States
- Legality of cannabis by U.S. jurisdiction
- Legal history of cannabis in the United States
- Whiteclay, Nebraska
