= Olivier Pastré =

French banker and economist

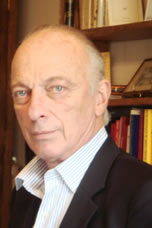
- Born: 15 December 1950 (age 74); Neuilly-sur-Seine, France
- Education: University of Rhode Island; University of Paris
- Occupation(s): Banker, economist, university professor
- Title: Professor
- Children: 2

Olivier Pastré (born 1950) is a French banker and economist. He serves as Chairman of IM Bank and as a professor of economics at Paris 8 University.

== Biography ==
=== Early life ===
Olivier Pastré was born on 15 December 1950 in Neuilly-sur-Seine near Paris in France. He received a Master of Arts degree in economics from the University of Rhode Island. He went on to receive a PhD in economics from the University of Paris, followed by the Agrégation in economics.

=== Career ===
He serves as chairman of the board of directors of IM Bank, a Tunisian bank. He also serves on the Board of Directors of CMP Banque, a French bank. He previously served as the Managing Director of GP Banque. He also served on the Board of Directors of Union Bank, an Algerian bank, as well as Medifin and MSIN, two Moroccan companies. Additionally, he serves on the board of the Banking Directors Association.

He was Professor of Economics at Paris 13 University from 1978 to 1983. He is now Professor of Economics at Paris 8 University. He is a member of the Cercle des économistes, a French think tank. He is also a Fellow of the Europlace Institute of Finance.

=== Personal life ===
He is married, and has two children.

== Bibliography ==
- La Stratégie Internationale des Banques Américaines (1979).
- La Crise du XX (1980).
- Les Nouveaux Piliers de la Finance (1992).
- La Banque (1997).
- Où va l'économie mondiale ? (2002).
- Le Capitalisme Déboussolé (2003).
- La Nouvelle Economie Bancaire (2005).
- La Méthode Colbert (2006).
- La Guerre Mondiale des Banques (2007).
- Le Roman vrai de la Crise financière (2008).
- Sorties de Crise (2009).
- On nous ment (2011).
