= Jean-Paul Chifflet =

French banker

- Born: 3 September 1949; Tournon-sur-Rhône, France
- Died: 25 May 2017 (aged 67); Saint-Jean-de-Muzols, France
- Occupation: Banker
- Known for: CEO of Crédit Agricole
- Children: 2
- Awards: Chevalier de la Légion d'honneur National Order of Merit (France); Order of Agricultural Merit

Jean-Paul Chifflet (3 September 1949 – 25 May 2017) was a French banker. He served as the chief executive officer of Crédit Agricole.

== Biography ==
=== Early life ===
Jean-Paul Chifflet was born in 1949 in Tournon-sur-Rhône, Ardèche, France. He grew up on a farm. He failed his Baccalauréat twice and passed it the third time. He graduated from the Institut des Hautes Finances de Paris. He played rugby union for FC Tournon-Tain.

=== Career ===
In 1973, at the age of twenty-four, he joined Crédit Agricole. On 1 March 2010 he became its CEO, replacing Georges Pauget. As a result, he also became Chairman of Amundi and Pacifica.

Chifflet died on 25 May 2017 when he fell from his self-propelled tractor while mowing his lawn.
