= Camille Landais =

French economist

- Education: École normale supérieure Paris School of Economics
- Discipline: Public economics Labour economics
- Institutions: London School of Economics
- Website: personal.lse.ac.uk/landais/

Camille Landais is a French economist who is Professor of Economics at the London School of Economics (LSE), where he is Director of the Suntory and Toyota International Centres for Economics and Related Disciplines (STICERD) and Co-Director of the Hub for Equal Representation in the Economy. His research is in public economics and labour economics.

Landais chaired the French Council of Economic Analysis (CAE) from 2022 to 2025. In 2016 he received the Philip Leverhulme Prize in Economics and the Prize for the Best Young Economist of France.

== Early life and education ==
Landais studied at the École normale supérieure (ENS Ulm) from 2000 to 2005. He completed a PhD in economics at the Paris School of Economics in 2009, under the supervision of Thomas Piketty, Anthony Atkinson and Bernard Salanié. After a brief stay at the University of California, Berkeley, Landais worked as a postdoctoral researcher at the Stanford Institute for Economic Policy Research (SIEPR) from 2010 to 2012.

== Career ==
Landais's research interests in public and labour economics include taxation, social insurance and gender inequality. His work with Henrik Kleven and Emmanuel Saez on the European football market and on a Danish tax scheme for foreign workers estimated how top earners respond to tax differences across countries. Another strand of his research measures "child penalties", the divergence in labour market outcomes between men and women following the birth of a first child.

Landais joined the London School of Economics in 2012 as an assistant professor, became an associate professor in 2016 and has been Professor of Economics since 2017. He has been Director of STICERD since 2022 and, since 2020, Co-Director of the Hub for Equal Representation in the Economy, a research programme on gender inequality funded by the Bill & Melinda Gates Foundation.

He became a member of the French Council of Economic Analysis in 2019 and served as its chairman from 2022 to 2025. From 2023 to 2025 he co-chaired the Franco-German Council of Economic Experts.

Landais directed the public economics programme of the Centre for Economic Policy Research from 2017 to 2023 and sat on the council of the European Economic Association from 2018 to 2022. He remains a fellow of the European Economic Association, the Institute for Fiscal Studies and the IZA Institute of Labor Economics, and is a research affiliate of the Institut des politiques publiques. He has been a co-editor of the American Economic Review since 2026.

== Awards and honours ==
- 2016 – Philip Leverhulme Prize in Economics
- 2016 – Prix du meilleur jeune économiste de France
- 2020 – American Economic Journal Best Paper Award
- 2020 – Franco-British Young Leader
- 2015 – Excellence Award in Global Economic Affairs, Kiel Institute for the World Economy

== Selected publications ==
- Kleven, Henrik; Landais, Camille; Saez, Emmanuel (2013). "Taxation and International Migration of Superstars: Evidence from the European Football Market". American Economic Review. 103 (5): 1892–1924. doi:10.1257/aer.103.5.1892.
- Landais, Camille; Michaillat, Pascal; Saez, Emmanuel (2018). "A Macroeconomic Approach to Optimal Unemployment Insurance: Theory". American Economic Journal: Economic Policy. 10 (2): 152–181. doi:10.1257/pol.20150088.
- Kleven, Henrik; Landais, Camille; Søgaard, Jakob Egholt (2019). "Children and Gender Inequality: Evidence from Denmark". American Economic Journal: Applied Economics. 11 (4): 181–209. doi:10.1257/app.20180010.
- Kleven, Henrik; Landais, Camille; Posch, Johanna; Steinhauer, Andreas; Zweimüller, Josef (2019). "Child Penalties across Countries: Evidence and Explanations". AEA Papers and Proceedings. 109: 122–126. doi:10.1257/pandp.20191078. hdl:20.500.11820/e704c2de-a310-4eb6-9d0e-ee370bdd12c4.
- Kleven, Henrik; Landais, Camille; Muñoz, Mathilde; Stantcheva, Stefanie (2020). "Taxation and Migration: Evidence and Policy Implications". Journal of Economic Perspectives. 34 (2): 119–142. doi:10.1257/jep.34.2.119.
- Kleven, Henrik; Landais, Camille; Posch, Johanna; Steinhauer, Andreas; Zweimüller, Josef (2024). "Do Family Policies Reduce Gender Inequality? Evidence from 60 Years of Policy Experimentation". American Economic Journal: Economic Policy. 16 (2): 110–149. doi:10.1257/pol.20210346.
- Kleven, Henrik; Landais, Camille; Leite-Mariante, Gabriel (2025). "The Child Penalty Atlas". Review of Economic Studies. 92 (5): 3174–3207. doi:10.1093/restud/rdae104.
- Landais, Camille; Piketty, Thomas; Saez, Emmanuel (2011). Pour une révolution fiscale: un impôt sur le revenu pour le XXIe siècle (in French). Paris: Éditions du Seuil. ISBN 978-2-02-103941-2.
