= Hippolyte d'Albis =

French economist

Hippolyte d'Albis is a French economist He is professor at ESSEC Business School.

== Early life and education ==
Hippolyte d'Albis obtained a magistère in finance from Paris-Panthéon-Assas University in 1996, a master's degree in mathematical economics from École Centrale Paris and Paris 1 Panthéon-Sorbonne University in 1997, and a PhD in Economics from Paris 1 Panthéon-Sorbonne University in 2003.

In 2006, he passed the French national examination for full professorship in economics (Agrégation de l'enseignement supérieur).

== Career ==
D'Albis was appointed associate professor of economics at Toulouse 1 Capitole University in 2004, professor at Paul Valéry University Montpellier 3 in 2006, professor at Paris 1 Panthéon-Sorbonne University in 2011, and research director at the CNRS in 2015.

In 2014 he became director of the Panthéon-Sorbonne doctoral school in economics. Between 2015 and 2017, he served as deputy scientific director at the Institute for Humanities and Social Sciences of the CNRS, and from 2018 to 2022 he was director of the École des Hautes Études en Démographie (HED).

On 1 August 2022 he was appointed as inspector general of finance of the General Inspectorate of Finance.

As of October 2026 he is a professor at ESSEC Business School.

== Research ==
=== Immigration ===
D'Albis has worked on the macro-economic impacts of immigration in France. With Boubtane and Coulibaly, he produced evidence that suggests that non-European migration has a positive impact on economic growth. Most notably, he showed the positive impact of family migration and migration of women. He is also working on the measurement of migration flows.

=== Intergenerational transfers ===
D'Albis is the director of the French team of the National Transfer Accounts, an international project that decomposes by age the variables of the National Accounts. This project permits comparisons across generations. D'Albis has provided evidence suggesting that the standards of living of recent French generations has not fallen compared to previous generations.

== Other activities ==
D'Albis is associate editor of three peer-reviewed academic journals: the Journal of Demographic Economics, the Journal of the Economics of Ageing, and Public Finance Review. He is also vice-president of the Cercle des économistes and a columnist for the French daily newspaper Les Échos.

== Honors and awards ==
- 2009: Appointed junior member of the Institut universitaire de France.
- 2009: Philippe Michel Prize for young researchers in economic dynamics, Paris School of Economics.
- 2011: Recipient of a European Research Council ERC Starting Grant.
- 2012: Best Young Economist of France, awarded by the Cercle des économistes and Le Monde.
- 2015: Laureate of the Fondation pour les sciences sociales.
- 2019: France-Berkeley Fund Award.
- 2023: Grand Prix de la Protection Sociale, awarded by the Caisse des dépôts et consignations and the École nationale supérieure de sécurité sociale (EN3S).

== Publications ==
- d'Albis; Boubtane; Coulibaly (2016). "Immigration Policy and Macroeconomic Performance in France" (PDF). Annals of Economics and Statistics (121/122): 279–308. doi:10.15609/annaeconstat2009.121-122.279. S2CID 217675255.
- d'Albis, Hippolyte; Esso, Loesse Jacques; Pifarré i Arolas, Héctor (2014). "Persistent Differences in Mortality Patterns across Industrialized Countries". PLOS ONE. 9 (9) e106176. Bibcode:2014PLoSO...9j6176D. doi:10.1371/journal.pone.0106176. PMC 4152125. PMID 25181447.
- d'Albis, Hippolyte; Lau, Sau-Him Paul; Sánchez-Romero, Miguel (2012). "Mortality transition and differential incentives for early retirement". Journal of Economic Theory. 147 (1): 261–83. doi:10.1016/j.jet.2011.11.004. S2CID 3870157.
- d'Albis, Hippolyte; Augeraud-Véron, Emmanuelle (2009). "Competitive Growth in a Life-Cycle Model: Existence and Dynamics". International Economic Review. 50 (2): 459–84. doi:10.1111/j.1468-2354.2009.00537.x. S2CID 153524843.
- d'Albis, Hippolyte (2007). "Demographic structure and capital accumulation" (PDF). Journal of Economic Theory. 132 (1): 411–34. doi:10.1016/j.jet.2005.10.001. S2CID 904659.
