= Antoine Bozio =

French-Swiss economist

Antoine Bozio (born April 24, 1978) is a French-Swiss economist who currently works as Associate Professor at the École des hautes études en sciences sociales (EHESS) and Associate Researcher at the Paris School of Economics (PSE), where he directs the Institut des politiques publiques. His research focuses on labour economics and the economics of ageing. In 2017, Bozio was awarded the Prize of the Best Young Economist of France for his research on the structure of pension systems and the impact of social security contributions on the supply of labour and wage levels.

== Biography ==
From 1999 to 2004, Antoine Bozio studied at the École normale supérieure in Paris, earning a master's degree in economics from the Université Paris 1 Panthéon-Sorbonne in 2002 and studying a semester abroad at Harvard University. In 2006, he obtained a PhD with a thesis on the French pension system under the supervision of Thomas Piketty. Following his graduation, Bozio worked first as a research economist (2006–09) and later as a senior research economist at the Institute for Fiscal Studies (IFS) (2009–11), while giving lectures as a teaching fellow at the University College London. Since 2011, Bozio has been Associate Researcher at the Paris School of Economics, Director of the Institut des politiques publiques (IPP), and Research Fellow at IFS. Moreover, since 2014, he has been Associate Professor at the École des hautes études en sciences sociales (EHESS). In addition to his academic positions, he was a member of the Council of Economic Analysis (2012–16). Finally, he performs editorial duties for Fiscal Studies.

== Research ==
Antoine Bozio's research focuses on pensions, taxation, disability insurance and the development of impact evaluation methods for public policies. Among else, he has researched the relationship between labour supply and employment, and compared the extensive and intensive margins of labour supply in the United States, United Kingdom and France.
