= Border effect =

Border effects refer to asymmetries in trade patterns between cities and regions of different countries and those that are located in the same country. Usually, trade volume between the former is much less. Economic integration (as in the EU) may be a solution to overcome these effects. A 2017 meta-analysis of 1,271 estimates of the border effect finds that borders reduce trade by one third.

More generally, "border effect" also refers to the tendency of people to purchase consumer goods in a locality that borders another jurisdiction where the desired good is either illegal or highly expensive. Several examples of this are detailed below.

== Examples ==
The small town of Whiteclay, Nebraska, which borders Oglala Lakota County, South Dakota, was previously noted for its role as a seller of alcohol to the Pine Ridge Indian Reservation (where alcohol is illegal). This ended when the town liquor stores' licenses were not renewed in 2017.

The border effect has been repeatedly observed in the United States since 2014, when the first legalized cannabis sales began in Colorado; it has since spread to various other states with legalized cannabis. A notable example is Ontario, Oregon, which borders Idaho and first opened cannabis dispensaries in 2019. Total cannabis sales from Ontario dispensaries topped $100 million in December 2020.
