= Sia (consulting firm) =

France-based management consulting firm

SIA
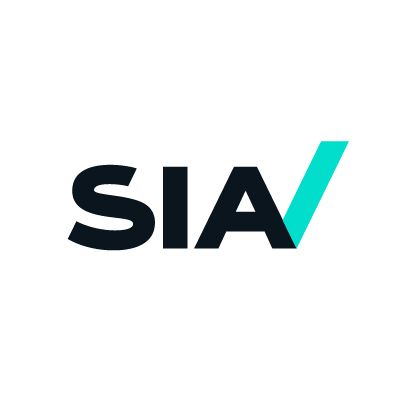
- SIA's logo
- Industry: Business consulting and management consulting
- Founded: 1999
- Founder: Matthieu Courtecuisse, Jérôme Miara
- Headquarters: Paris, France
- Key people: Matthieu Courtecuisse (Founder and CEO), Sandrine Carreau (President and COO)
- Products: Management consulting, operational strategy, and artificial intelligence
- Website: www.sia-partners.com

Sia is an international consulting firm specializing in strategy, management, and artificial intelligence, founded in 1999 in Paris by Matthieu Courtecuisse. Sia works with private companies, primarily Fortune 500 firms, and public-sector organizations on strategic, technological, and organizational transformation projects.

In January 2025, Sia Partners changed its identity and became Sia. In 2025, Sia operates 48 offices across 19 countries throughout Europe, North America, Africa, the Middle East, Asia, and Oceania.

== Sectors of activity ==
Sia operates across various sectors, including banking, insurance, energy, healthcare, technology, transportation, luxury goods, tourism, and manufacturing.

Its consulting services cover multiple aspects of transformation projects, such as strategy definition, internal organization, digital use cases, artificial intelligence, customer experience, and process optimization.

== History ==
=== Foundation and early development (1999–2008) ===
Sia was co-founded in 1999 in Paris by Matthieu Courtecuisse, initially specializing in the financial services and energy sectors before expanding its expertise to other fields and positioning itself in the adoption of artificial intelligence for businesses.

Between 2005 and 2009, Sia expanded its operations in Europe and the Middle East, opening offices in Belgium (Brussels), Italy (Rome and Milan), Morocco (Casablanca), the United Arab Emirates (Dubai), and the Netherlands.

=== External growth and international expansion (2008–2020) ===
Starting in 2008, Sia pursued an external growth strategy, primarily through the acquisition of local consulting firms organized around specific markets or areas of expertise.

Between 2008 and 2012, Sia completed two tactical acquisitions in France: EDS Consulting Services France (2008) and Axelboss

Between 2013 and 2018, Sia acquired the international management consulting activities of the Investance Group in London, Hong Kong, and New York. In London, Sia also acquired three boutique firms: Molten Group, Inzenka, and SKT Consulting.

In 2017, Sia acquired an investment fund called “Le Studio,” designed to invest in start-ups.

Between 2018 and 2020, the firm acquired Loft9 Consulting and Pathfinder.

In 2020, Sia launched a strategic consulting practice dedicated to cybersecurity in Paris.

=== Consolidation and diversification (2021–2024) ===
In 2021, Sia surpassed 2,000 employees globally. The company also created SiaXperience, a brand grouping activity related to creativity and design.

In 2021, Sia acquired Uside, a French consulting firm specializing in leadership, organizational behavior, and quality of work life, founded by Eric Albert.

Between 2021 and 2023, Sia successively acquired Ethier, Summus Group, PPT Consulting, Stratumn, E2E"Edmonton-based management consultancy E2E joins Sia Partners". Consulting.ca. 2022-09-12. Churchill Consulting, and Latham BioPharm Group.

In 2024, Sia opened new offices in Australia (Sydney), Canada (Ottawa), India (Mumbai), and China (Shanghai).

In 2026, Sia continues its US expansion with the acquisition of Kaiser Associates, and launches its global Corporate Strategy, Private Equity and M&A Business Line.

=== Blackstone investment ===
In December 2024, the investment fund Blackstone acquired a minority stake in Sia for an amount of €250 million.

=== Artificial intelligence activities ===
Since the late 2010s, Sia has integrated artificial intelligence into its consulting activities. The firm reports employing approximately 450 data and AI specialists and operating several international research and development laboratories. According to Consultor.fr, this positioning reflects a broader evolution in industry practices. In 2023, the company introduced a generative artificial intelligence tool called SiaGPT.

In 2025, Sia launched an “Agent Store” to offer agent-based solutions to its partners. Sia also established partnerships with AWS and NVIDIA.

=== Commitments and responsibilities ===
Since 2019, Sia has implemented a corporate social responsibility (CSR) approach, including initiatives related to environmental issues, diversity, and selected innovation projects.

=== Management ===
Sia is led by Matthieu Courtecuisse, founder and majority shareholder, and Sandrine Carreau, President and COO. The company’s capital is primarily held by partners and executives, as well as by Blackstone since 2024.

== See also ==
- Strategy consulting
- Digital transformation
- Generative AI
- Blackstone Group
