= Georges Pauget =

- Born: 7 June 1947 (age 78); Rumilly, France
- Education: University of Lyon; University of Bordeaux
- Occupation: Banker
- Known for: CEO of Crédit Agricole (2005-2010)

Georges Pauget (born 1947) was the CEO of Crédit Agricole and LCL S.A. from 2005 to 2010.

== Biography ==
Pauget was born in Rumilly, Haute-Savoie in 1947. He received an M.A. in Economics from the University of Lyon and a Ph.D. in 1975 from the University of Bordeaux.

He has been Chairman of Union des Assurances Fédérales, TLJ SAS, Uni-Editions, CEDICAM, and SERVICAM.

He started working for Crédit Agricole in 1973. He worked both in the provinces and in Paris. In 2005 he became the CEO of Crédit Agricole and LCL S.A. He also became the Chairman of Calyon in 2007.

In 2008 he became the Chairman of the French Banking Federation. He also represents permanently Crédit Lyonnais for the Fondation de France and Crédit Agricole SA on the Supervisory Board of Fonds de Garantie des Depôts. He has been decorated Chevalier de la Légion d'honneur.

In January 2009, he was publicly reluctant to relinquish his bonuses. In December 2009, he published a book about the financial crisis, Faut-il brûler les banquiers?. He blames the crunch on the Clinton administration, banking regulators and overseers, central banks, and financial markets. He will step down as CEO in February 2010.

== Bibliography ==
- Faut-il brûler les banquiers? (2009)
- Banque: Le grand saut? (2012)
