= Direction générale du Trésor =

French government institution

The Direction générale du Trésor (DG Trésor, English: Directorate General of the Treasury, or French Treasury) is the flagship directorate general of the French Ministry of the Economy and Finance. It holds an advisory role within the French Government on matters ranging from domestic to international economic policy. Its main offices are located in Paris, in the building of Bercy. The DG Trésor also represents and defends French economic interests abroad by overseeing the economic departments of embassies (French : service économique), and by providing permanent representations at international organizations (IMF, World Bank Group, OECD, WTO, G20, G7, specific comities of the European Commission, etc.).

The Direction générale du Trésor should not be confused with the Trésor public, a national administration responsible for France's governmental accounting.

== Responsibilities ==
The Direction générale du Trésor is tasked with:

- Monitoring the latest economic, financial and monetary developments;
- Producing economic forecasts;
- Formulating and advising the government on national and international economic and financial policy;
- Representing and defending French economic interests abroad and at international organizations;
- Managing the French sovereign debt through the Agence France Trésor (AFT).

== Organisation ==
The DG Trésor falls under the authority of the Minister of the Economy and Finance, currently Roland Lescure, and is headed by a Director General (currently Bertrand Dumont). Additionally, the French Treasury provides the chief economist of the ministry, Agnès Bénassy-Quéré since June 2020.

The Directorate General is composed of five departments and one secretariat general:

- Macroeconomic Policies and European Affairs Department (SPMAE);
- Public Policy Department (SPP);
- Bilateral Affairs and International Business Development Department (SABINE);
- Financial Sector Department (SFE);
- Multilateral Affairs, Trade and Development Policies Department (SAMD);
- Secretariat General.

The Agence France Trésor is an autonomous department of the DG Trésor, created in 2001, tasked with managing French government debt and state participations. Its staff is composed mostly of agents from the French Treasury.
