= Agnès Bénassy-Quéré =

French economist (born 1966)

- Born: 15 March 1966 (age 60); Paris, France
- Office: Deputy Governor of the Banque de France
- Predecessor: Sylvie Goulard
- Awards: Prix du meilleur jeune économiste de France

Academic background
- Education: ESCP Business School (PhD); Paris Dauphine University (HDR)

Academic work
- Discipline: Economics
- Institutions: Paris School of Economics; French Ministry of the Economy and Finance; Centre d'Etudes Prospectives et d'Informations Internationales
- Main interests: International monetary systems Exchange rates Economic policy European integration

Agnès Bénassy-Quéré (born 15 March 1966) is a French economist who has been serving as Deputy Governor of the Banque de France since 2023.

From 2020 to 2023, Bénassy-Quéré was the chief economist at the Direction générale du Trésor (or French Treasury). She is also a professor of economics at University Paris 1 Panthéon-Sorbonne and at the Paris School of Economics.

== Career ==
Bénassy-Quéré's research interests include the international monetary systems, exchange rates, economic policy, and the European integration.

Bénassy-Quéré worked for the Ministry of the Economy and Finance before moving to academic positions successively at Cergy-Pontoise University (1993–1996), Lille 2 (1996–1999), Paris-Ouest (2000–2004) and École Polytechnique (2009–2011).

In addition, Bénassy-Quéré also served as a deputy director (1998–2006) and as director (2006–2012) of the Centre d'Etudes Prospectives et d'Informations Internationales (CEPII). Since 2023: second deputy governor of the Bank of France, replacing Sylvie Goulard.

== Recognition ==
Bénassy-Quéré's research was awarded Best Young French Economist Award by Cercle des économistes and Le Monde in 2000 (together with Bruno Amable).

== Other activities ==
- Bruegel, Member of the Board
- CESifo, Research Network Fellow
- German Institute for Economic Research (DIW), Member of the Scientific Advisory Board
- Banque de France, Member of the General Council (–2020)

== See also ==
- Conseil d'Analyse Économique
