= Rencontres Economiques d'Aix-en-Provence =

French economic forum

Rencontres Économiques d'Aix-en-Provence
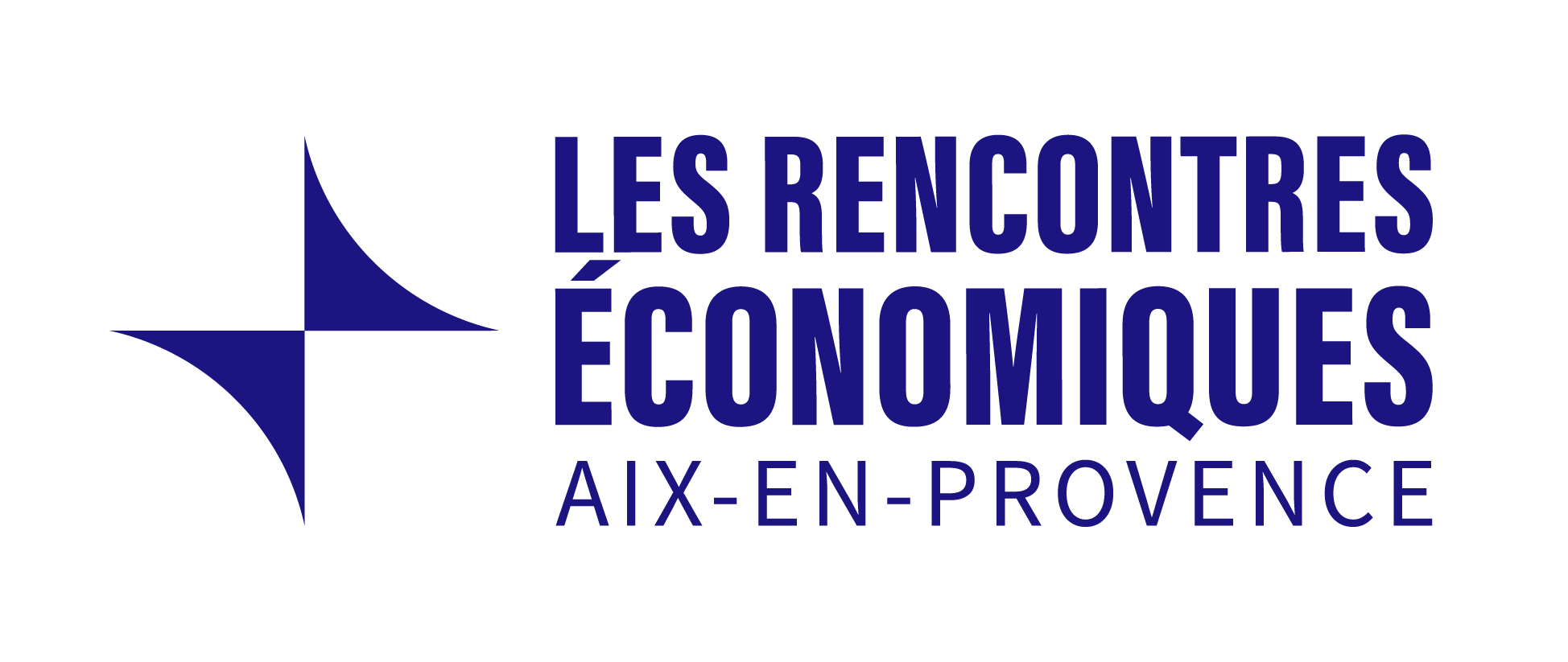
- Formation: 2001
- Founder: Cercle des économistes
- Type: Economic Forum
- Headquarters: Aix-en-Provence, France
- Official language: English, French
- Website: www.lesrencontreseconomiques.fr

The Rencontres Économiques d'Aix-en-Provence is an international economic forum organized by French think tank Le Cercle des économistes since 2001, in the city of Aix-en-Provence, France.

== Organization ==
Free and public, this forum brings together business leaders, academics, international organizations, NGOs, politicians and students for three days of discussion.

Les Rencontres Économiques d’Aix-en-Provence has as its goal to vitalize economic debate at the French, European and international levels. Organized each year around one main economic and societal theme, the forum aims to make diverse influential figures debate each other as well as answer questions from the public in order to contribute to a better understanding of economic issues. Discussions traditionally conclude with the final declaration of the Cercle des économistes, a collection of proposals to respond to the theme addressed during the forum.

All sessions and debates can be followed live on the official forum's website and on its YouTube channel. The forum brought together over 350 speakers, 7,000 participants, and more than 200 representatives from the print, radio, TV, and online media.

== Activities ==
=== Participants ===
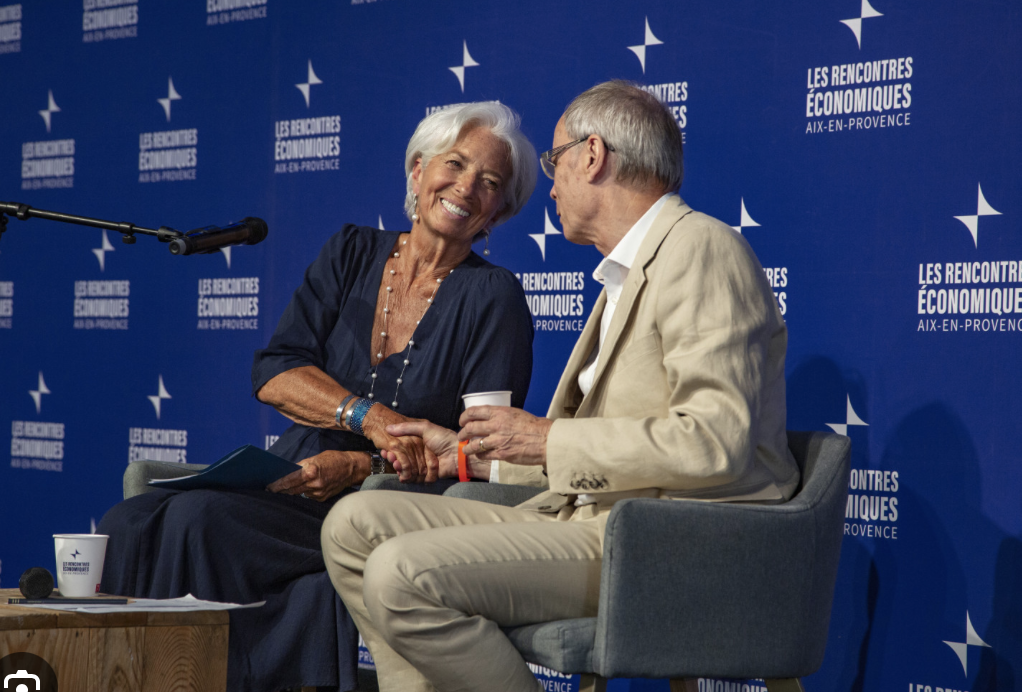
Christine Lagarde and Jean Tirole at the Rencontres Économiques d'Aix-en-provence in 2024

Since its creation, many personalities have participated to the Rencontres Économiques d'Aix-en-Provence. Among them:

- Academics: Olivier Blanchard, Suzanne Berger, Claudia-Maria Buch, Esther Duflo, Barry Eichengreen, Eugène Fama, Robert Fogel, Francis Fukuyama, Roberto Lavagna, Robert Merton, Dani Rodrik, Kenneth Rogoff, Nouriel Roubini, Peter Sloterdijk, Joseph Stiglitz, Laura Tyson, Cédric Villani, Zhu Min.
- Institutional bodies: Stephen Breyer, Mario Draghi, José Ángel Gurría, Christine Lagarde, Pascal Lamy, Cecilia Malmström, Pierre Moscovici, Jean-Claude Trichet.
- Politics: Madeleine Albright, Jörg Asmussen, Laurent Fabius, Elsa Fornero, Valéry Giscard d'Estaing, Alain Juppé, Bruno le Maire, Emmanuel Macron, David Miliband, Mario Monti, Ngozi Okonjo-Iweala, Ana Palacio, Edouard Philippe, Hery Rajaonarimampianina, Macky Sall, Tharman Shanmugaratnam, Paul Wolfowitz, Ernesto Zedillo, Martin Ziguélé.
- Companies: Patricia Barbizet, Emmanuel Faber, Carlos Ghosn, Paul Hermelin, Philipp Hildebrand, Isabelle Kocher, Anne Lauvergeon, Jean-Marc Ollagnier, Patrick Pouyanné, Stéphane Richard, Tidjane Thiam, Hal Varian.
- Civil society: Luc Besson, Sharon Burrow, Reza Deghati, Yu Hua, Francis Huster, Étienne Klein, Mo Ibrahim, Thierry Marx, Erik Orsenna, Thomas Pesquet, Bertrand Piccard, Abderrahmane Sissako.

=== Previous editions ===
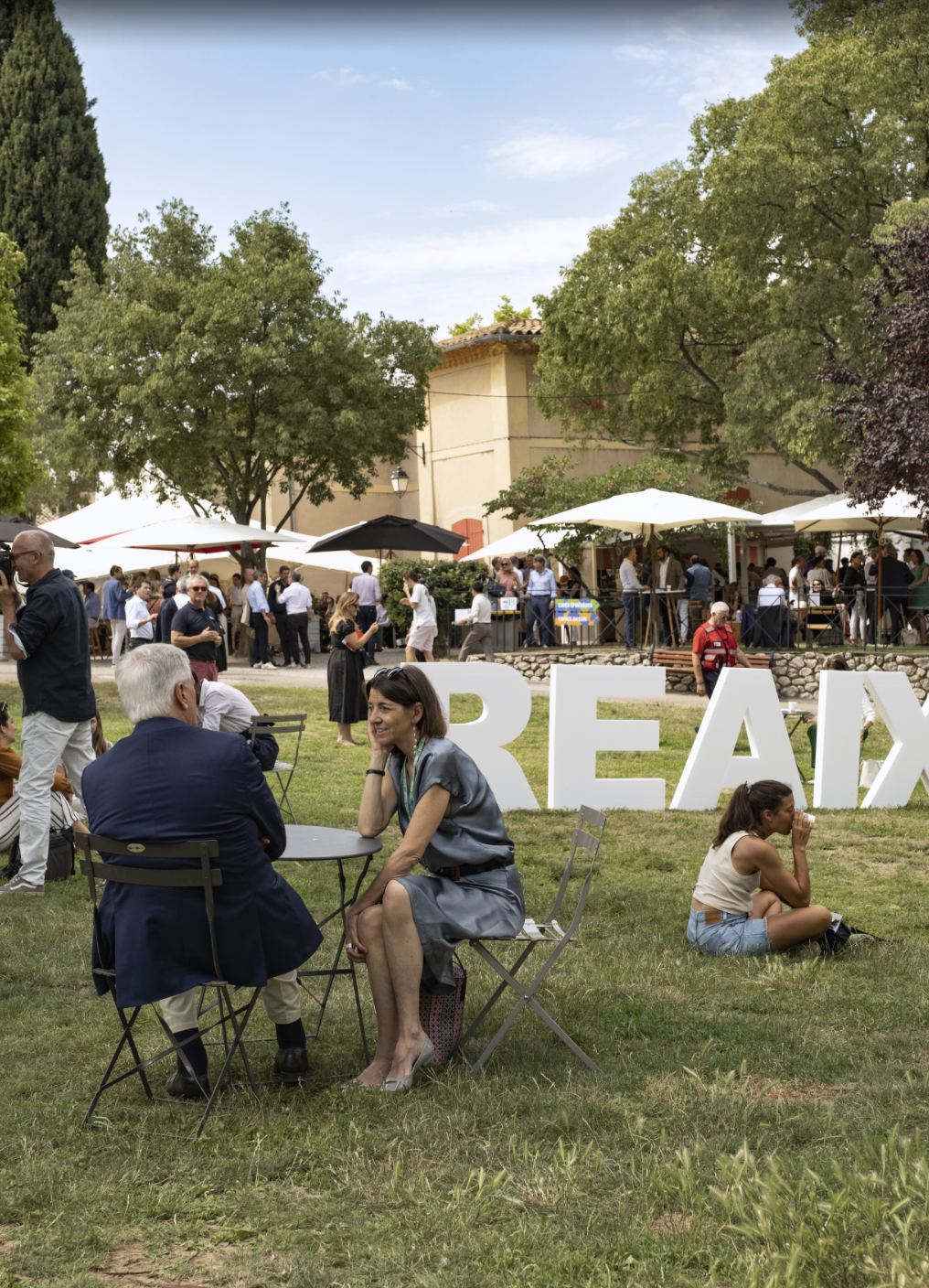
Les Rencontres 2024

- The 24nd edition “Linking Worlds” was held from 5 and 5 July 2024
- The 23nd edition "Recreating Hope" was held from 7 to 9 July 2023
- The 22nd edition "Successfully transforming the world" was held from 5 to 7 July 2022
- The 21st edition "Seize the future, together" was held from 2 to 4 July 2021
- The 20th edition "Acting in the face of disruptions in the world - We will get through this!" was held from 3 to 5 July 2020.
- The 19th edition "(???)" was held from 5 to 7 July 2019.
- The 18th edition "The World's Metamorphoses" was held from 6 to 8 July 2018
- The 17th edition "In Search of New Forms of Prosperity" was held from 7 to 9 July 2017
- The 16th edition "In a World of Turmoil, What is a Nation for?" was held from 1 to 3 July 2016.
- The 15th edition "What if Work Were the Key?" was held from 3 to 5 July 2015.
- The 14th edition "Invest and Invent Tomorrow" was held from 4 to 6 July 2014.
- The 13th edition "The Clash of Times : The World Economy, between Emergencies and the Long Term" was held from 5 to 7 July 2013.
- The 12th edition "What if the Sun also Rises in the West... The new Global dynamics" was held from 6 to 8 July 2012.
- The 11th edition "The States of the World" was held from 8 to 10 July 2011.
- The 10th edition "In search of new growth" from 2 to 4 July 2010.
- The 9th edition "Growth, demography, finance:from major economic breakdowns to new balances" was held from 3 to 5 July 2009.
- The 8th edition "Firms: the new frontiers" was held the 4 to 6 July 2008.
- The 7th edition "Which Capitalisms for the XXIth Century ?" was held from 6 to 8 July 2007.
- The 6th edition "A World of scarce resources : “Is World economic growth in jeopardy ?” was held from 7 to 9 July 2006.
- The 5th edition "The United States and Europe" was held from 8 to 10 July 2005.
- The 4th edition "European Companies in the global competition" was held from 9 to 11 July 2004.
- The 3rd edition "Europe, a new world economy" was held from 4 to 6 July 2003.
- The 2nd edition "Europe and the world governance" was held from 5 to 7 July 2002.
- The 1st edition "Is the European construction running out of steam ?" was held from 15 to 16 July 2001.

== The Rencontres all over the world ==
Several editions of the Rencontres Economiques have been held internationally:

- Organization of the Rencontres Economiques de Singapour: in January 2016 on the theme “Europe and the Asian Century: Keys for the World Economy?”, in 2019 with “Les nouveaux horizons de l'économie mondiale”, and in 2024 on “L'Indopacifique : pivot de l'équilibre mondial ”Organization of the first edition of the Rencontres Economiques de Kigali, in Rwanda, in November 2023, on the theme “En temps de crise, quelles opportunités pour l'Afrique?”.
- Organization of the Rencontres Economiques in Casablanca. In April 2014, the first edition of the Economic Encounters in Casablanca was held on the theme “Is the future of the World African?”.
- Co-organization of the Rendez-vous de la Méditerranée with the Institut de la Méditerranée/Femise. This annual economic forum focuses on Mediterranean issues.

== See also ==
- Cercle des économistes
