= Daniel Cohen (economist) =

French economist (1953–2023)

- Born: 16 June 1953; Tunis, Tunisia
- Died: 20 August 2023 (aged 70); Paris, France
- Education: École normale supérieure Paris Nanterre University
- Occupation: Economist
- Awards: Legion of Honour – Knight (2001)

Daniel Cohen (16 June 1953 – 20 August 2023) was a prominent French economist, a co-founder and professor at the Paris School of Economics, as well as a senior advisor to the bank Lazard.

Cohen was born in Tunis, Tunisia, on 16 June 1953, and died in Paris on 20 August 2023, at the age of 70.

== Works ==
- Monnaie, Richesse et Dette des Nations, Editions du CNRS, 1987.
- Private Lending to Sovereign States, MIT Press, 1991.
- Les infortunes de la Prospérité, Paris: Julliard, 1994. (translation MIT Press).
- Richesse du monde, pauvretés des nations, Flammarion, 1997 (translation MIT Press).
- Nos Temps Modernes, Flammarion, 2000 (traduction MIT Press, et en 8 autres langues).
- La mondialisation et ses ennemis, 2004, Paris, Grasset (translation MIT Press).
- Trois leçons sur la société post-industrielle, Sept 2006, Paris, Seuil. (Spanish translation: Tres lecciones sobre la sociedad postindustrial, Buenos Aires/Madrid, Katz editores S.A, 2007, ISBN 978-84-96859-05-0)
- 27 Questions d'économie contemporaine (Tome 1), under the direction of Philippe Askenazy and Daniel Cohen 2008
- La Prospérité du vice, Une introduction (inquiète) à l'économie 2009
- 16 nouvelles questions d'économie contemporaine (Tome 2), with Philippe Askenazy and Daniel Cohen 2010
- Le monde est clos et le desir infini , Paris: Albin Michel, 2015; (English translation: The Infinite Desire for Growth. Princeton University Press. 2018. ISBN 9780691172538.)
- Une brève histoire de l'économie, Paris: Albin Michel, 2024; (English translation: A Brief History of the Economy. Polity Books. 2025. ISBN 9781509568307.)

== Awards and distinctions ==
- Laureat of the Association française de sciences économiques (1987)
- American Express Special Merit Award (1987)
- Le Nouvel Économiste "Economist of the Year" (1997)
- Prix Léon Faucher from the Académie des sciences morales et politiques (2000)
- Prix du Livre d’économie (2000)
- Laureat du prix européen (2000)
- Prix Synapsis for the book Mutation et travail (2000)
- Legion of Honour – Knight (11 April 2001)
- Brussels Lectures in Economics (2003)
