= ENSAE Paris =

French Grande École of engineering

Coordinates: 48.7110682°N 2.2076584999999795°E

- École nationale de la statistique et de l'administration économique Paris
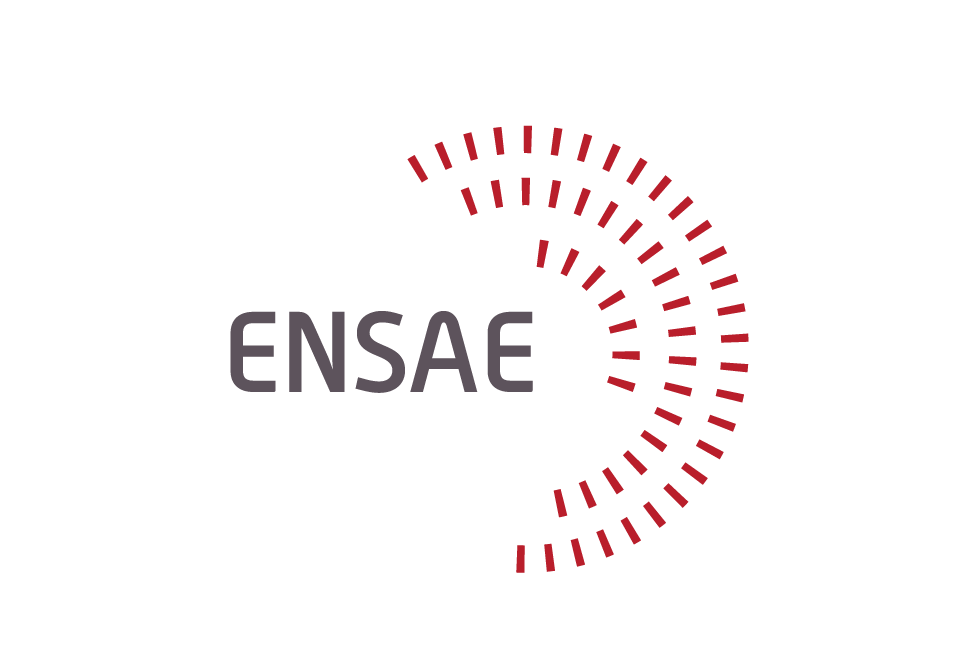
- Other names: La grande école de l'économie, de la statistique, de la finance et de l'assurance
- Motto: Compter pour savoir, comprendre pour prévoir
- Motto in English: Count for knowledge, grasp to forecast
- Type: Grande Ecole
- Established: 1942
- President: Pierre Biscourp
- Faculty: 49
- Students: 581
- Location: Palaiseau, France
- Campus: Paris-Saclay
- Website: www.ensae.fr/en

ENSAE Paris, officially École nationale de la statistique et de l'administration économique de Paris (French pronunciation: [ekɔl nɑsjɔnal də la statistik e də ladministʁɑsjɔ̃ ekɔnɔmik də paʁi]; 'Paris National School of Statistics and Economical Management'), is a grande école in France and a member of IP Paris (Institut Polytechnique de Paris). ENSAE Paris is known as the specialization school of École polytechnique for economics, finance, applied mathematics, statistics, and data science. It is one of France's top engineering schools and is directly attached to France's Institut national de la statistique et des études économiques (INSEE) and the French Ministry of Economy and Finance.

== History ==
The ENSAE was established in 1942 by the National Statistics Service (ancestor of the INSEE, National Institute of Statistics and Economic Studies) under the name School of Applied Statistics. In 1946, with the creation of INSEE, the school took the name of INSEE Specialization School. At this time, the school led to two types of administrative careers: "administrateur" (the highest managing level of the INSEE administration) and "attaché" (a lower level) civil servant executive. Early promotions included five or six "administrateurs" students and five or six "attachés" students.

The decree of 2 November 1960 changed the school's name to the National School of Statistics and Economic Administration. As a result, the number of students grew, and the school opened to graduate students from law schools and universities of economics. Finally, the decree of 15 April 1971 clarified the administrative status and the objective of the school in the academic field, designating the ENSAE a Grande Ecole.

In the 1980s, a scholarship system was established to support doctoral studies. In addition, a research laboratory, the CREST (Center for Research in Economics and Statistics), a joint laboratory with Ecole Polytechnique, was formed in 1988.

In 1994, the Department of training for "attachés" became a full-fledged school, the National School for Statistics and Analysis Areas information (ENSAI, relocated to Rennes). The "administrateurs" training stayed at the ENSAE where increasing numbers of students chose to specialize in financial modeling and other new areas of applied statistics such as biostatistics or quantitative marketing.

In 2006, Prime Minister Dominique de Villepin officially announced the moving of the school to the new ParisTech Campus in Palaiseau, near the École polytechnique, in 2010.

In 2017, the school moved to its current campus in Palaiseau.

== Mission ==
Included in the National Institute of Statistics and Economic Studies (INSEE) under the tutelage of Ministry of the Economy, Industry and Employment, ENSAE provides training for statisticians-economists, some of which are civil servants belonging to the Corps des Administrateurs de l'INSEE, a category of top level public managers in the French administration.

Economists and statisticians trained are intended to contribute to the economic research; former students hold positions within international organizations (UN, IMF, World Bank, European Commission,...) and French administration or other public institutions (Ministry of Economy, INSEE, CREST,...).

The school admits students from diverse backgrounds:

- Alumni of classes préparatoires (from scientific preparatory classes MP / PC / PSI / MPI, but also business school preparatory classes ( "ECG") and Humanities and Social Sciences preparatory classes (Khâgne BL)).
- Admission after a graduate degree (normaliens, polytechniciens students or other holders of Grandes écoles Master's degrees).

The institution is actually the only French Grande école to admit scientific, business and humanities students, as long as a strong quantitative background is provided.

Since 2006 the school is accredited to deliver the title of "ingénieur" by the French Commission of Engineering Titles.

== Academic affiliations ==
The school has several partnerships and agreements with other academic institutions where students can complete their curriculum during their specialization year. A large and growing number of students chose to do such dual degree program in order to get an additional Master of Science, MBA or PhD degree from renowned institutions in the area of economics, finance, statistics, and applied Mathematics where its curriculum is one of the best, such as Harvard, Stanford, Princeton, Columbia, NYU, Chicago, Cornell, Cambridge, Oxford, Imperial College, LSE, Humboldt University of Berlin, Mannheim, Universitat Pompeu Fabra, etc.

The ENSAE also has a partnership with Sciences Po Paris, HEC Paris, ESSEC Business School, ESCP Business School allowing its students to pursue both curriculum at the same time and get an additional master's degree from said universities. The agreement waives the students from passing the entry written examination.

ENSAE was a member of ParisTech, the excellence engineering cluster gathering the best parisian Grandes Ecoles in each area of engineering: X, AgroParisTech, ENGREF, Ponts, ESPCI, Mines, ENSTA, ENSAM, Télécom Paris, Chimie ParisTech.

In 2019, a portion of these schools (including ENSAE, X, Télécom Paris) left ParisTech to create the "Institut Polytechnique"

== Jobs prospects ==
Former ENSAE graduates work in a variety of fields, including data science and machine learning, as well as finance, management, consulting, economic analysis, and research (in economics and statistics).

About 14% of the recent alumni work in the public sector, the remaining works in insurance (25%), consulting (21%) or other industry sectors.

Around 17% of them get a first job outside France, in particular in London and New York. They are hired by tech firms, financial firms such as banks, insurers or hedge funds for their technical expertise in Data Science, Machine learning, finance, mathematics, economics and statistics.

2006 graduate positions are as follows:

- 53% work in Machine learning/Data Science (including research)
- 33% work in finance insurance:
- 21% work in financial engineering
- 7% are traders
- 11% are actuaries
- 3% are portfolio managers
- 24% are work in market survey and consulting:
- 10% economic analysis
- 4% consulting
- 1% audit

Since the ENSAE was founded, more than 6,500 statisticians economists, machine learning engineers, and data scientists have graduated.

== Remark ==
Note that the abbreviation ENSAE also refers to SUPAERO, a grande école for aerospace engineering in Toulouse, France (now ISAE). In order to mark the difference between the two schools, ENSAE is called "ENSAE Paris", in reference to the city where it is located.

== Alumni ==
As a Grande Ecole, the ENSAE has a strong and organized alumni network. The "Association des Anciens de l'ENSAE" (ENSAE Alumni Association) manages the links between the different generations of graduates and help them at each stage of their career. The ENSAE Alumni Association is a member of ParisTech Alumni, manageurs.com and AAGEF. The current president of the association is Julien Guitard.

Here is a list of some of the most accomplished alumni.

- Philippe Brassac, CEO of Crédit Agricole
- Georges Elhedery, CEO of HSBC
- Benoît Coeuré, Member of the executive board of the European Central Bank, previously director of Agence France Trésor
- Frédéric Gagey, CFO of Air France-KLM
- Guy Abeille, economist.
- Jacqueline Aglietta (1965), CEO of Médiamétrie
- Michel Aglietta (1964), economist
- Christian Gouriéroux, economist
- Patrick Artus (1975), economist, professor at École polytechnique and chief economist at Natixis
- Alain Bensoussan (1965), member of the French Academy of Sciences, former chairman of European Space Agency (ESA) Council, former president of the CNES, former president of the INRIA
- François Bourguignon, former chief economist of the World Bank, president of the Paris Graduate School of Economics
- Philippe Bouyoux (1982), director of the economic policy, French Ministry of finance
- Guillaume Carlier, mathematician
- Jérôme Cazès (1977), CEO of Coface
- Eric Chaney (1988), chief economist (Axa)
- Paul Champsaur (1968), president of the French Telecommunications, Postal and Print Media Distribution regulation authority (ARCEP)
- Jean-Michel Charpin (1973), economist, previously director of the French National Institute of Economy l'INSEE
- Alain Desrosières (1965), sociologist
- Bruno Durieux (1969), former Minister
- Pierre-Henri Flamand (1995), global head of Goldman Sachs Principal Strategies
- Philippe Khuong-Huu (1988), co-founder of Alphadyne Asset Management
- Henri Gagnaire (1987), chairman, SVP
- Franck Goddio, underwater archaeologist
- Michel Haski (1970), CEO of AGF Asset Management
- Philippe Herzog (1964), former European Deputy
- Jean-Jacques Laffont (1970), economist
- Fabien Lévy, composer, former professor of composition at Columbia University, professor at the University of Music and Theatre Leipzig
- Antoine Paille (1977), founder of the Equity Derivatives Department of Société Générale Corporate & Investment Banking in 1980' see article here
- Edmond Malinvaud (1948), economist
- Jean-Louis Mathias (1973), EDF
- Gilles Michel (1979), chairman and chief executive officer of Imerys, former managing director of Citroën (PSA Peugeot Citroën) and managing director of the Fonds stratégique d'investissement (FSI)
- Jean-Claude Milleron (1963), economist
- Hamza Ben Driss Ottmani (1973), Moroccan economist and writer
- Pierre-Michel Passy, president of Edmond de Rothschild Investment Partners
- Patrick Rey, professor at the IDEI and at the École polytechnique
- Bernard Salanié (1986), economist, professor at the École polytechnique and at Columbia University
- Christian Sautter (1965), former French Minister of Finances
- Claude Thélot (1970), former president of the Commission du débat national sur l'avenir de l'École
- Michel Volle (1965), economist
