= Cercle des économistes =

- Formation: 1992
- Founder: Jean-Hervé Lorenzi
- Type: Association
- Location: Paris, France
- Website: official website

Le Cercle des économistes is a French think tank founded in 1992 by Jean-Hervé Lorenzi. The association is made up of 30 economists who are also French university academics. It is a non-profit organization whose mission is to organize and promote economic discussion and debate, which is open and accessible to everyone. Its members are distinguished by diverse approaches and varied areas of special competence, ensuring the richness and inclusiveness of its discussions.

Le Cercle des économistes organizes various annual events (with its own in-house team) such as Les Rencontres Economiques d'Aix-en-Provence which has turned into an international economic forum, the association releases also several annual economic publications and its members are frequently solicited by French and international media.

== Members ==
Yann Algan, Patrick Artus, Agnès Bénassy-Quéré, Françoise Benhamou, Jean-Paul Betbèze, Anton Brender, André Cartapanis, Jean-Michel Charpin, Jean-Marie Chevalier, Hippolyte d'Albis, Christian de Boissieu, Pierre-Yves Geoffard, Patrice Geoffron, Bertrand Jacquillat, Jean-Hervé Lorenzi (President), Catherine Lubochinsky, Jacques Mistral, Olivier Pastré, Jean Pisani-Ferry, Jean-Paul Pollin, Hélène Rey, Dominique Roux, Christian Saint-Étienne, Christian Stoffaës, Akiko Suwa-Eisenmann, David Thesmar, Philippe Trainar, Alain Trannoy.

Due to their responsibilities, Laurence Boone, Benoît Coeuré, Lionel Fontagné, Pierre Jacquet, Anne Perrot and Claire Waysand are members in "disponibility".

== Activities ==
- Organization of Les Rencontres Economiques d'Aix-en-Provence which has become one of the global economic conferences.
- Decernation of the award Prix du meilleur jeune économiste de France. Organized every year in partnership with the newspaper Le Monde, this price is an award given annually to the Best young French Economist elected by Le Cercle des économistes and Le Monde.
- Organization of Les Rencontres Économiques à Casablanca. In April 2014, Le Cercle des économistes organized the first edition of Les Rencontres Économiques à Casablanca on the theme « Is the World’s future African? ».
- Co-organization of Les Rendez-vous de la Méditerranée. Each year, Le Cercle des économistes organizes Les Rendez-vous de la Méditerranée with l’Institut de la Méditerranée / Femise. This seminary tackles mediterranean issues
- Publications of "Les Cahiers du Cercle des économistes" (in French) which tackles different economic subjects.
- Weekly intervention in Les Echos (France) and in BFM Business. Each Monday, two members of Le Cercle des économistes intervenes in the Economic TV Show “« Le Grand Journal avec le Cercle des économistes » on BFM Business, the first economic French TV Channel. Each Wednesday, a member of Le Cercle des économistes publishes an article in Les Échos, the leading French economic newspaper.

== External links and related articles ==
- Official website
- Rencontres Economiques d'Aix-en-Provence
- Prix du meilleur jeune économiste de France
