= Paris School of Economics =

French research institute

Coordinates: 48°49′20.8″N 2°19′52.4″E

- École d'économie de Paris
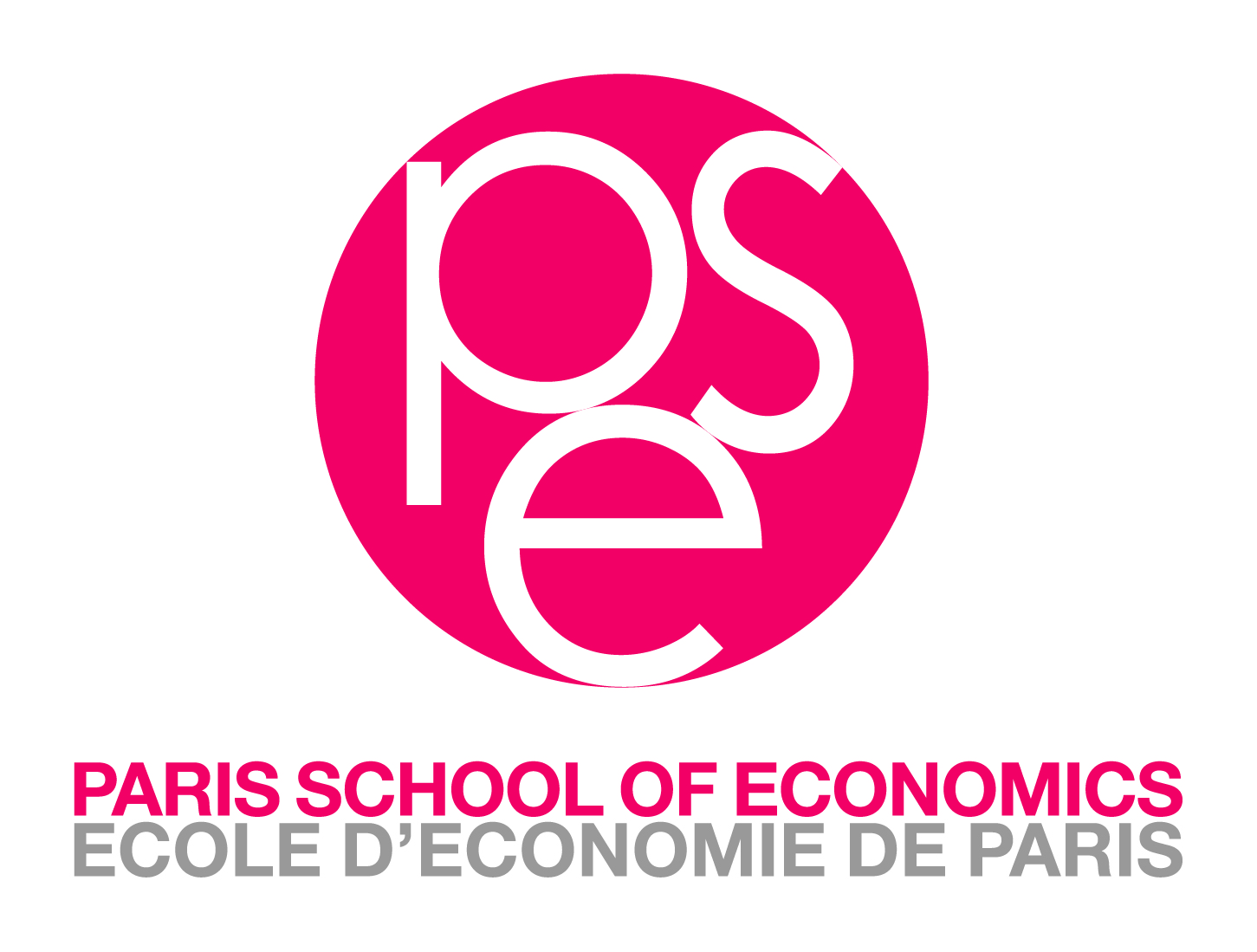
- Motto: La science économique au service de la société
- Motto in English: Economics serving society
- Type: Public
- Established: 2006 as an independent institution; 1988 under a different name/institution
- Academic affiliations: EHESS, ENS-PSL, École des ponts, University Paris 1
- Chancellor: Jean-Pierre Danthine
- President: Esther Duflo
- Dean: Jean-Olivier Hairault
- Academic staff: 145
- Students: 220
- Postgraduates: 180
- Location: Paris, France
- Campus: Urban
- Website: www.parisschoolofeconomics.eu/en/

The Paris School of Economics (PSE; French: École d'économie de Paris) is a French research institute in the field of economics. It offers MPhil, MSc, and PhD level programmes in various fields of theoretical and applied economics, including macroeconomics, econometrics, political economy and international economics.

PSE is a brainchild of the École des hautes études en sciences sociales (EHESS, where the students are enrolled primarily), École normale supérieure · PSL (ENS), the École des ponts and University Paris 1 Panthéon-Sorbonne. It is physically located on the ENS-PSL Jourdan campus, in the 14th arrondissement of Paris. It was founded in 2006 as a coalition of grandes écoles, a university and an école normale supérieure to unify high-level research in economics across French academia, and was first presided by economist Thomas Piketty.

== Status ==
Created in December 2006, the Paris School of Economics has the status of fondation reconnue d’utilité publique (a Public interest foundation). This status allows PSE to draw on both public and private funding.

PSE is a "Fondation de Coopération scientifique" (Scientific Research Foundation), a new type of foundation created by the French government to develop centres providing national excellence. Scientific Research Foundations operate according to the same rules as Public interest foundations.

- The Paris School of Economics is administered by a Board of Directors consisting of representatives of the public and private partners, researchers, and outside personalities.
- The Scientific Council consists of international researchers, external to PSE, of whom at least 50% work abroad. The Scientific Council evaluates the quality of both current and proposed teaching and research programmes. 3 Nobel Prizes laureates are members of the PSE Scientific Council.

== Degree programmes ==
The foundation offers teaching through four Master programmes (APE, PPD, EDCBA, and Economics & Psychology) and a PhD Economics programme (within EDE-EPS).

=== Master's programmes ===
- Master APE: Analysis and Policy in Economics
- Master PPD: Public Policy and Development
- Master EDCBA: Economic Decision and Cost-Benefit Analysis
- Master Economics and Psychology

== PSE in international rankings ==
Its contributory economics faculties, including the Ecole Normale Superieure, École des Hautes Études en Sciences Sociales, the Ecole Polytechnique and ENSAE, are ranked between the top 13 among 53 departments worldwide by publication output of the top five scholars. According to the global economics departments ranking released in May 2020 by RePEc, Paris School of Economics was ranked at 5th worldwide, 1st in Europe.

== International partnerships ==
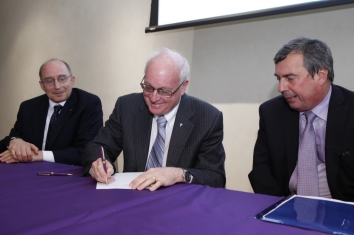
NYU Provost David McLaughlin (middle); Ron Robin, NYUAD Senior Vice Provost, Francois Bourguignon, Paris School of Economics director

The Paris School of Economics has exchange students programs with some universities such as New York University or the University of California, Berkeley. It is also member of many exchange networks :

- Economic Behavior and Interaction Models (EBIM): Bielefeld University
- European Doctorate in Economics Erasmus Mundus (EDEEM): Amsterdam University, Bielefeld University, Lisbon University, University of Louvain, Venice University
- Programme doctoral européen en économie quantitative (EDP): Florence University, London School of Economics (LSE), Bonn University, Leuven University, Tel-Aviv University, Pompeu Fabra University
- Policy Design and Evaluation Research in Developing Countries (PODER): Bocconi University, London School of Economics (LSE), Stockholm University, Namur University, Pompeu Fabra University, Cape Town University
- Quantitative Economics Doctorate (QED): Alicante University, Amsterdam University, Bielefeld University, Copenhagen University, Lisbon University, Venice University, Vienna University

The World Inequality Report 2018 compiled by Facundo Alvaredo, Lucas Chanel, Thomas Piketty, Emmanuel Saez, and Gabriel Zucman was released on 14 December 2017 at the Paris School of Economics during the first WID.world Conference held on 14 December and 15 December, which was sponsored by the Paris School of Economics, the Institute for New Economic Thinking (INET), the Washington Center for Equitable Growth (CEG), the Ford Foundation, and the European Research Council. World Wealth and Income Database (WID), an open source database, which is part of an international collaborative effort of over a hundred researchers in five continents. The WID is an extension of the earlier World Top Incomes Database (WTID).

== Alumni ==
- Esther Duflo (MIT), 2019 Nobel Memorial Prize in Economic Sciences Laureate, 2010 John Bates Clark Medal Laureate
- Gilles Duranton (University of Pennsylvania)
- Emmanuel Farhi (Harvard University)
- Xavier Gabaix (New York University)
- Pierre-Olivier Gourinchas (University of California, Berkeley)
- Thierry Magnac (Toulouse School of Economics)
- Thomas Philippon (New York University)
- Thomas Piketty (Paris School of Economics), author of Capital in the Twenty-First Century
- Hélène Rey (London Business School)
- Patrick Rey (Toulouse School of Economics)
- Emmanuel Saez (University of California, Berkeley), 2009 John Bates Clark Medal Laureate
- Benoît Cœuré (European Central Bank)
- Gabriel Zucman (University of California, Berkeley)

== Scientific council ==
- Francesco Billari (Nuffield College Oxford University)
- Jess Benhabib (New York University)
- Pierre-André Chiappori (Columbia University)
- Rodolphe Dos Santos (University of Strasbourg)
- Marion Fourcade (University of California, Berkeley)
- Jordi Gali (CREI Barcelona, University of Pompeu Fabra)
- Duncan Gallie (Nuffield College Oxford University)
- Oliver Hart (Harvard University)
- Naomi Lamoreaux (Yale University)
- Costas Meghir (Yale University)
- Daniel McFadden (University of California, Berkeley)
- Sir James Mirrlees (Chinese University of Hong Kong)
- Patrick Rey (Université de Toulouse)
- Dani Rodrik (Harvard Kennedy School at Harvard University)
- Roy Wong Bin (University of California, Los Angeles)

== See also ==
- Abdul Latif Jameel Poverty Action Lab
- Labex Refi
