= Germán Bernácer Prize =

Bernácer Prize
- Awarded for: Outstanding contributions in the fields of macroeconomics and finance
- Location: Madrid, Spain
- Presented by: Observatorio del Banco Central Europeo (OBCE)
- First award: 2001
- No. of laureates: 21 Laureates as of 2022
- Website: http://bernacerprize.com/

The Bernácer Prize is awarded annually to European young economists who have made outstanding contributions in the fields of macroeconomics and finance. The prize is named after Germán Bernácer, an early Spanish macroeconomist.

The prize was created in 2001 by the Observatory of the ECB (OBCE, Observatorio del Banco Central Europeo), a nonprofit association of economists that aims at promoting the public debate on the policies of the European Central Bank and, more broadly, on the problems the European economy is facing, with the aim of improving the quality of economic policies.

The Germán Bernácer prize was established in 2001 to recognize the work of young economists from the European Union and to stimulate research on European macroeconomics and financial issues. Modelled on the John Bates Clark Medal, prizewinners are economists under the age of 40.

The prize includes a diploma and a cash award of €30,000. From the first edition of the prize to the 10th edition, the prize was sponsored by Caja de Ahorros del Mediterráneo (CAM). Since the 11th edition the sponsor has been Banco Santander.

Prizewinners usually receive the diploma directly from the chairman of the selection committee together with a representative of the sponsor and/or the governor of Bank of Spain, at a solemn ceremony award in Madrid. The diploma contains a text in English with the name of the laureate and a citation of why they received the award. Due to the COVID-19 pandemic, the award ceremony of the 19th and 20th editions took place in virtual format.

After twenty-one consecutive editions, the Bernacer Prize is widely regarded as one of the most prestigious awards for European economists.

== Prizewinners ==
=== 2001–2010 ===
2001

The 2001 Bernacer Prize was awarded to the Irish economist Philip Lane (Trinity College Dublin) "for outstanding contributions to European monetary economics".

The award ceremony took place in Madrid on November 23, 2001.

2002

The 2002 Bernacer Prize was awarded to the Spanish economist José Manuel Campa (IESE Business School) "for his outstanding research on exchange rate behaviour and internacional finance".

The award ceremony took place in Alicante on December 3, 2002.

2003

The 2003 Bernacer Prize was awarded to the Italian economist Luigi Zingales (Chicago Booth School of Business) "for his important research on financial markets and fight of poverty".

The award ceremony took place in Madrid on April 19, 2004.

2004

The 2004 Bernacer Prize was awarded to the German economist Stephanie Schmitt-Grohe (Duke University) "for her important research devoted to developing and applying the tools for evaluation of macroeconomic (fiscal and monetary) stabilization policies in the context of economies subject to nominal and real distortions".

The award ceremony took place in Madrid on June 29, 2005.

2005

The 2005 Bernacer Prize was awarded to the German economist Monika Piazzesi (Stanford University) "for her important research in developing a unified approach that improves our understanding of the connection between asset prices- including bonds, equities and real estate- and the institutional features of monetary policy and the business cycles".

The award ceremony took place in Madrid on May 31, 2006.

2006

The 2006 Bernacer Prize was awarded to the French economist Hélène Rey (Princeton University) "for her important research on the determinants and consequences of external trade and financial imbalances, the theory of financial crisis and the internationalization of currencies. Her contributions help to improve our understanding of the connections among globalization, exchanges rates and external markets".

The award ceremony took place in Madrid on May 21, 2007.

2007

The 2007 Bernacer Prize was awarded to the French economist Pierre-Olivier Gourinchas (University of California, Berkeley) "for his important research on explaining recent (puzzling) facts in global macroeconomics and finance, evaluating the gains of financial integration and analyzing the importance of precautionary saving in optimal life--cycle models of consumption expenditure in the presence of uncertain labour income".

The award ceremony took place in Madrid on May 27, 2008.

2008

The 2008 Bernacer Prize was awarded to the German economist Markus Brunnermeier (Princeton University) "for his important research on explaining the emergence and persistence of asset price bubbles, the causes of liquidity crises in financial markets, and the implications of these phenomena for risk management and for financial regulators".

The award ceremony took place in Madrid on June 10, 2009.

2009

The 2009 Bernacer Prize was awarded to the French economist Emmanuel Farhi (Harvard University) "for his relevant contributions to the design of optimal taxation in business cycle models with incomplete markets, and for improving our understanding of the macroeconomic mechanisms that underlie the relationships among global imbalances, financial crashes, speculative growth episodes and real activity".

The award ceremony took place in Madrid on June 2, 2010.

2010

The 2010 Bernacer Prize was awarded to the French economist Xavier Gabaix (NYU Stern School of Business) "for his original research contributions in financial and behavioural economics, including the consequences of seemingly irrational behaviour on asset markets, and his analysis of the level of compensation of corporate executives".

The award ceremony took place in Madrid on June 1, 2011.

=== 2011–2021 ===
2011

The 2011 Bernacer Prize was awarded to the Danish economist Lasse Heje Pedersen (Copenhagen Business School and NYU Stern School of Business) "for his original research contributions on how the interaction between market liquidity risk and funding liquidity risk can create liquidity spiral and systemic financial crisis".

The award ceremony took place in Madrid on June 28, 2012.

2012

The 2012 Bernacer Prize was awarded to the British economist Nicholas Bloom (Stanford University) "for his influential research contributions on the sources, dynamics and effects of policy and economic uncertainty on business cycles as well as on the determinants of good management practices".

The award ceremony took place in Madrid on September 24, 2013.

2013

The 2013 Bernacer Prize was awarded to the French economist Thomas Philippon (NYU Stern School of Business) "for his influential research on efficiency trends in the finance industry, the costs of financial distress and intervention policies in markets subject to adverse selection".

The award ceremony took place in Madrid on November 3, 2014.

2014

The 2014 Bernacer Prize was awarded to the Italian economist Veronica Guerrieri (University of Chicago Booth School of Business) "for her influential research contributions regarding the application of search theory to explain the emergence of illiquidity and fire sales in different asset markets".

The award ceremony took place in Madrid on May 13, 2016.

2015

The 2015 Bernacer Prize was awarded to the Belgian economist Stijn Van Nieuwerburgh (NYU Stern School of Business) "for his influential research on the transmission of shocks in the housing market on the macro-economy and the prices of financial assets".

The award ceremony took place in Madrid on December 16, 2016.

2016

The 2016 Bernacer Prize was awarded to the Portuguese economist Ricardo Reis (London School of Economics) for his "influential research on the transmission of shocks in the presence of sticky information and the analysis of automatic stabilizers during the business cycle".

The award ceremony took place in Madrid on November 24, 2017.

2017

The 2017 Bernacer Prize was awarded to the German economist Benjamin Moll (Princeton University) for his "path-breaking contributions to incorporate consumer and firm heterogeneity into macroeconomic models and use such models to study rich interactions between inequality and the macroeconomy".

2018

The 2018 Bernacer Prize was awarded to the French economist Gabriel Zucman (University of California, Berkeley) for his "influential research on wealth inequality and the redistributive effects of globalization".

The award ceremony took place in Madrid on October 11, 2019.

2019

The 2019 Bernacer Prize was awarded to the Greek economist Loukas Karabarbounis (University of Minnesota) "for his influential research on the interaction between labor and capital market imperfections and macroeconomic outcomes."

The award ceremony took on October 21, 2020, and for the first time in virtual format due to the COVID-19 pandemic.

2020

The 2020 Bernacer Prize was awarded to the Dutch economist Ralph Koijen (University of Chicago Booth School of Business) "for his influential research on the pricing of risk in equity and insurance markets".

The award ceremony took on November 22, 2021, and for the second year in a row in virtual format due to the COVID-19 pandemic.

2021

The 2021 Bernacer Prize was awarded to the Italian economist Matteo Maggiori (Stanford Graduate School of Business) "for his influential research on international finance and macroeconomics, including asset pricing and exchange rate dynamics".

== Selection committee ==
The prize nominations are assessed by an independent Selection Committee made up of recognized members of the academic community. The committee member from the Executive Board of the European Central Bank also serves as the chairperson of the selection committee, while the members choose a secretary of the selection committee from within the group. Should two candidates receive the same number of votes, the chairperson of the committee will cast the deciding vote.

Chairperson and committee member

- 2001: Otmar Issing, chief economist of the European Central Bank (ECB)
- 2002–2010: Lucas Papademos, vice-president of the ECB
- 2011–2018: Vítor Constâncio, vice-president of ECB
- 2019– : Luis de Guindos, vice-president of ECB

Secretary and committee member

- 2001–2002: Miguel Sebastián Gascón, professor of economics at Complutense University of Madrid
- 2003–2016: Juan J. Dolado, professor of economics at European University Institute
- 2017– :

Committee members (various during 2001–2019)

members during selection of 2018 prize winner, if not earlier:

- Olivier Blanchard, Professor of Economics emeritus at Massachusetts Institute of Technology (MIT), Senior Fellow at the Peterson Institute for International Economics
- Jordi Galí, Research Professor at Barcelona Graduate School of Economics, Director of Pompeu Fabra University's Centre de Recerca en Economia Internacional (CREI)
- Francesco Giavazzi, Professor of Economics at Bocconi University's Innocenzo Gasparini Institute for Economic Research (IGIER), Visiting Professor at MIT
- Evi Pappa, Professor of Economics at the European University Institute, Research Fellow with Centre for Economic Policy Research (CEPR)
- Edward C. Prescott, Nobel Prize in Economics (2004), Professor and Chair of Economics at Arizona State University's W. P. Carey School of Business
- Rafael Repullo, Professor and Director of the Centro de Estudios Monetarios y Financieros (CEMFI) and Co-Director of CEPR
- Charles Wyplosz, Professor of International Economics at Graduate Institute of International and Development Studies, Editor of CEPR's VoxEU

members prior to selection of 2018 prize winner:

- Charles Goodhart, Professor at London School of Economics
- Eduardo Schwartz, Professor of Economics and Finance at the UCLA Anderson School of Management
- José Viñals, Director of the Monetary and Capital Markets Department of International Monetary Fund

== About prizewinners ==
=== Nationality of the prizewinner ===
Country	Prizes	Prizewinner
Belgium	1	Stijn Van Nieuwerburgh ('15)
Denmark	1	Lasse Heje Pedersen ('11)
France	5	Hélène Rey ('06), Pierre-Olivier Gourinchas ('07), Emmanuel Farhi ('09), Xavier Gabaix ('10), Thomas Philippon ('13), Gabriel Zucman ('18)
Germany	4	Stephanie Schmitt-Grohe ('04), Monika Piazzesi ('05), Markus Brunnermeier ('08), Benjamin Moll ('17)
Ireland	1	Philip Lane ('01)
Italy	3	Luigi Zingales ('03), Veronica Guerrieri ('14), Matteo Maggiori ('21)
Netherlands	1	Ralph Koijen ('20)
Portugal	1	Ricardo Reis ('16)
Spain	1	José Manuel Campa ('02)
United Kingdom	1	Nicholas Bloom ('12)
Greece	1	Loukas Karabarbournis ('19)

=== University affiliation ===
University	Prizes	Country	Prizewinner
Chicago Booth School of Business	3	United States	Luigi Zingales ('03), Veronica Guerrieri ('14), Ralph Koijen ('20)
Copenhagen Business School	1	Denmark	Lasse Heje Pedersen ('11)
Duke University	1	United States	Stephanie Schmitt-Grohe ('04)
Harvard University	1	United States	Emmanuel Farhi ('09)
IESE Business School	1	Spain	José Manuel Campa ('02)
London School of Economics	1	United Kingdom	Ricardo Reis ('16)
NYU Stern School of Business	4	United States	Xavier Gabaix ('10), Lasse Heje Pedersen ('11), Thomas Philippon ('13), Stijn Van Nieuwerburgh ('15)
Princeton University	3	United States	Hélène Rey ('06), Markus Brunnermeier ('08), Benjamin Moll ('17)
Stanford University	3	United States	Monika Piazzesi ('05), Nicholas Bloom ('12), Matteo Maggiori ('21)
Trinity College Dublin	1	Ireland	Philip Lane ('01)
University of California, Berkeley	2	United States	Pierre-Olivier Gourinchas ('07), Gabriel Zucman ('18)
University of Minnesota	1	United States	Loukas Karabarbournis ('19)

=== Gender of the prizewinner ===
Gender	Number of prizewinners	Prizewinner
Female	4 (19.1%)	Stephanie Schmitt-Grohe ('04), Monika Piazzesi ('05), Hélène Rey ('06), Veronica Guerrieri ('14)
Male	17 (80.9%)	Philip Lane ('01), José Manuel Campa ('02), Luigi Zingales ('03), Pierre-Olivier Gourinchas ('07), Markus Brunnermeier ('08), Emmanuel Farhi ('09), Xavier Gabaix ('10), Lasse Heje Pedersen ('11), Thomas Philippon ('13), Nicholas Bloom ('12), Stijn Van Nieuwerburgh ('15), Ricardo Reis ('16), Benjamin Moll ('17), Gabriel Zucman ('18), Loukas Karabarbournis ('19), Ralph Koijen ('20), Matteo Maggiori ('21)

== See also ==
- List of economics awards
