= Emmanuel Farhi =

French economist (1978–2020)

- Born: 8 September 1978; Paris, France
- Died: 23 July 2020 (aged 41); Cambridge, Massachusetts, U.S.

Academic background
- Education: Massachusetts Institute of Technology (PhD); Corps des Mines; École Normale Supérieure (MSc, agrégation)
- Doctoral advisor: Ricardo J. Caballero; Iván Werning

Academic work
- Discipline: Macroeconomics; Finance; Mathematical economics
- Institutions: Harvard University (2006–2020); Toulouse School of Economics
- Website: Information at IDEAS / RePEc

Emmanuel Farhi (8 September 1978 – 23 July 2020) was a French economist who served as the Robert C. Waggoner Professor of Economics at Harvard University from 2018 to 2020. A specialist in macroeconomics, taxation and finance, he also served on the Conseil d’Analyse Économique (CAF) in 2010.

== Early life and education ==
Emmanuel Farhi was born in Paris in 1978, the son of André Farhi, a development economist who escaped Egypt, and Danièle Debordeaux, a specialist in social policy. Emmanuel mentioned that he was a descendent of Haim Farhi, who was a highly influential Damascene Jew in the late 18th and early 19th centuries. He attended the Lycée Louis-le-Grand, where, in 1995, he won the concours général in physics, and completed his classes préparatoires in mathematics. In 1997, he ranked first on the national competitive exam for entry to the École Polytechnique. He chose instead to attend the École Normale Supérieure, where he specialised in mathematics and received his agrégation in 1999, ranking second. At the ENS, he took classes from Fields Medalist Cédric Villani, and received a Master of Science degree in mathematics and economics in 2001. He was then admitted to the Corps des Mines, and completed its programme in government and business in 2005. He received a PhD in economics from the Massachusetts Institute of Technology in 2006, where he was advised by Ricardo J. Caballero and Iván Werning.

== Career ==
In 2006, Farhi was appointed an assistant professor at Harvard University, where he became a tenured full professor in 2010, and the Robert C. Waggoner Professor of Economics in 2018. One of the leading economists of his generation in both the US and France, Farhi’s research focused on macroeconomics and finance, particularly on financial stability and the process of reforming the international monetary system. He served on the Conseil d’Analyse Économique from 2010 to 2012, under Prime Minister François Fillon. He received the Bernácer Prize in 2009, and the Prix du meilleur jeune économiste de France in 2013. He became a research associate at the NBER in 2006, and was elected a Fellow of the Econometric Society in 2015.

Though highly quantitative, his work shed light on practical issues such as macroprudential regulation, mitigating the impacts of economic crises, and understanding the implications of fiscal policies. For example, he assessed the controversial Social VAT, a measure introduced by French President Nicolas Sarkozy and repealed by his successor François Hollande only to reemerge under a different form: the "Competitiveness Pact". Farhi’s work cast a spotlight on a range of issues, including monetary economics, public finance, international economics, global imbalances, fiscal policy, and taxation. He also focused on issues like mitigating the impacts of economic crises and macroprudential regulation, a system used to describe the laws, rules, and conditions for banks and financial organizations that are meant to protect the whole financial system from risk.

In September 2014, the IMF published a list of 25 “economists under 45 [who] will have the most influence in the coming decades on our understanding of the global economy”. Farhi was one of the 7 French economists listed for his work on "monetary economics, international economics, finance and public finance, including research on global imbalances, monetary and fiscal policy, and taxation."

Farhi frequently co-authored academic papers with Iván Werning, David Baqaee, Xavier Gabaix, and Jean Tirole.

== Selected publications ==
Farhi authored and published many academic articles and a book.

- Reforming the International Monetary System
- "Speculative Growth: Hints from the US Economy" (en coll.), American Economic Review, vol. 96, n° 4, September 2006.
- "Saving and Investing for Early Retirement: A Theoretical Analysis" (en coll.), Journal of Financial Economics, vol. 83, n° 1, 2007.
- "An Equilibrium Model of Global Imbalances and Low Interest Rates" (en coll.), American Economic Review, 2008.
- "A Theory of Liquidity and Regulation of Financial Intermediation" (en coll.), Review of Economic Studies, 2009.
- "Progressive Estate Taxation" (en coll.), Quarterly Journal of Economics, 2010.
- "Nonlinear Capital Taxation without Commitment" (with Christopher Sleet, Iván Werning, and Sevin Yeltekin) Review of Economic Studies, October 2012, 79, no. 4: 1469–1493.
