= Kenneth Singleton =

American economist

Kenneth J. Singleton
- Born: 1951 (age 74–75)

Academic background
- Education: Reed College, University of Wisconsin-Madison
- Doctoral advisor: Edgar L. Feige

Academic work
- Institutions: Stanford University
- Doctoral students: Lasse Heje Pedersen

Kenneth Jan Singleton (born 1951) is an American economist. He is a leading figure in empirical financial economics, and a faculty member at Stanford University. As the Adams Distinguished Professor of Management, emeritus at Stanford Graduate School of Business, Singleton teaches a variety of degree courses in finance.

Singleton received a BA in mathematics from Reed College in 1973, and went on to complete his PhD in economics from the University of Wisconsin-Madison. His recent research in econometric methods for estimation and testing of dynamic asset pricing models has been highly influential in academic circles. He is the author of Credit Risk with Darrell Duffie and a new book titled Empirical Dynamic Asset Pricing: Model Specification and Econometric Assessment. He has coauthored significant academic papers with Lars Peter Hansen, Darrell Duffie, Jun Pan and Qiang Dai. Ken's research interests are in econometric methods for estimation and testing of dynamic asset pricing models; modeling of term structures of government and defaultable bond yields; measuring and managing market, credit and liquidity risks; and debt financing in emerging economies. He is Adams Distinguished Professor of Management I, Codirector of the Credit Risk Executive Program with Darrell Duffie, and a Member of the Consortium on Financial Systems and Poverty. Among various consulting and advisory relationships with industry, he is senior scientist for Financial Crossing, a Palo Alto start-up developing liability management and mortgage advice software.

His professional awards include the Smith Breeden Distinguished Paper Prize from the Journal of Finance, the Frisch Medal from the Econometric Society, the Stephen A. Ross Prize in Financial Economics, and the Irving Fisher Dissertation Award. He was named fellow of the Econometric Society in 1988 and of the Journal of Econometrics in 1998, and has been a research associate at the National Bureau of Economic Research since 1982. In 1991–92, he was a vice president in the Fixed Income Research department of Goldman Sachs, Asia while on leave from Stanford. He was the special advisor to the chief economist at the IMF in 2009 during the global crisis. Ken was the president of the Society for Financial Studies from 2011 to 2012 and was the editor-in-chief of the Journal of Finance from 2012 to 2016.

He is the co-founder and President of 1 Grain to 1000 Grains, a nonprofit that provides healthful eating and financial planning programming for families in low-income communities.

== Bibliography ==
- Kenneth J. Singleton (2009) [2006]. Empirical Dynamic Asset Pricing: Model Specification and Econometric Assessment. Princeton University Press. ISBN 978-0691122977.
- Darrell Duffie; Kenneth J. Singleton (2012). Credit Risk: Pricing, Measurement, and Management. Princeton University Press. ISBN 978-8122421682.
- Kenneth J. Singleton (2007). Japanese Monetary Policy. University of Chicago Press. ISBN 978-0-226-76068-1.
