= Benjamin Golub =

American economist

Academic background
- Education: California Institute of Technology; Stanford University
- Doctoral advisor: Matthew O. Jackson; Andrzej Skrzypacz; Robert B. Wilson

Academic work
- Discipline: Microeconomics, economics of networks
- Institutions: Northwestern University
- Notable ideas: Research on social learning, financial networks
- Awards: Calvó-Armengol International Prize, 2020
- Website: Information at IDEAS / RePEc

Benjamin Golub (also known as Ben Golub) is an American economist who is a professor of economics and computer science at Northwestern University. His research focuses on the economics of networks. He was named the winner of the 2020 biannual Calvó-Armengol International Prize, which recognizes a “top researcher in [e]conomics or social sciences younger than 40 years old for contributions to the theory and comprehension of the mechanisms of social interaction.”

== Career ==
Golub received a bachelor's degree in mathematics from the California Institute of Technology in 2007. He received his PhD in economics from the Stanford Graduate School of Business in 2012. From 2013 to 2015, he was a Junior Fellow at Harvard Society of Fellows, and then a faculty member at the Harvard University Department of Economics, as an assistant professor from 2015 to 2019, and then as an associate professor. He is now a professor in the departments of Economics and Computer Science at Northwestern University, where he has been since 2021.

Golub received the Calvó-Armengol International Prize in a ceremony in Andorra in November 2021.

In 2025, Golub cofounded Refine Technologies, Inc., a company that develops AI tools for providing structural feedback on academic research papers, with Yann Calvó López; he serves as its Chief Scientist.

== Research ==
Golub's research focuses on social and economic networks. He has been recognized for his contributions to the study of social learning, particularly the DeGroot model. Golub's studies highlight the importance of network structure for the quality of learning, and how homophily in social networks causes polarization of opinions. He has also done research on contagion of failure in financial networks.
