= Lasse Heje Pedersen =

Danish financial economist (born 1972)

Lasse H. Pedersen
- Born: Copenhagen, Denmark

Academic background
- Education: Stanford University Graduate School of Business; University of Copenhagen
- Doctoral advisor: Darrell Duffie, Kenneth Singleton

Academic work
- Discipline: Financial Economics
- Awards: Bernácer Prize, Fama-DFA Prize, Michael Brennan Award
- Website: Information at IDEAS / RePEc

Lasse Heje Pedersen (born October 3, 1972) is a Danish financial economist known for his research on liquidity risk and asset pricing. He is Professor of Finance at the Copenhagen Business School. Before that, he held the position of a Professor of Finance and Alternative Investments at the New York University Stern School of Business. He has also served in the monetary policy panel and liquidity working group at the Federal Reserve Bank of New York and is a principal at AQR Capital Management.

He was the winner of the 2011 Germán Bernácer Prize, awarded annually to the best European economist under the age of 40, for his original research contributions on how the interaction between market liquidity risk and funding liquidity risk can create liquidity spirals and systemic financial crises.

== Education and academic career ==
After completing his bachelor's and master's degrees in mathematics and economics at the University of Copenhagen in 1997, he went to Stanford University Graduate School of Business where he earned a Ph.D. in Finance in 2001, advised by Darrell Duffie and Kenneth Singleton. Upon graduation he started as assistant professor at the New York University Stern School of Business where he got tenure in 2005 and held the position of John A. Paulson Professor of Finance and Alternative Investments from 2009 to 2014. He is currently a Distinguished Visiting Research Professor at NYU and, since 2011, Professor of Finance at Copenhagen Business School.

His research has been cited by central bankers such as Fed Chairman Ben Bernanke and in the press, including The Economist, The New York Times, Forbes, and The Financial Times.

== Work on market and funding liquidity risk ==
Lasse H. Pedersen's research shows that investors need to be compensated for incurring trading costs and the risk of rising trading costs. Therefore, securities with higher market liquidity risk have higher required return, as per the liquidity-adjusted CAPM.

Further, many investors face funding constraints (e.g., leverage constraints and margin requirements), and funding liquidity problems affect security prices. Funding constraints raise the required return for securities with high margin requirements or low risk.

His research shows how the interaction between market and funding liquidity risk can create liquidity spirals and liquidity crises. Liquidity problems affect the macro economy and imply that monetary authorities can manage leverage and margin requirements as a second monetary tool.

One of the implications of his research on systemic risk is the argument in favour of regulatory authorities implementing systemic risk surcharges to generate incentives for financial institutions to limit their contributions to systemic risk. Under a regime with such surcharges, institutions would aim to lower their surcharges by reducing size, leverage, risk, and correlation with the rest of the financial sector and the economy.
