= Benjamin Moll =

German macroeconomist (born 1983)

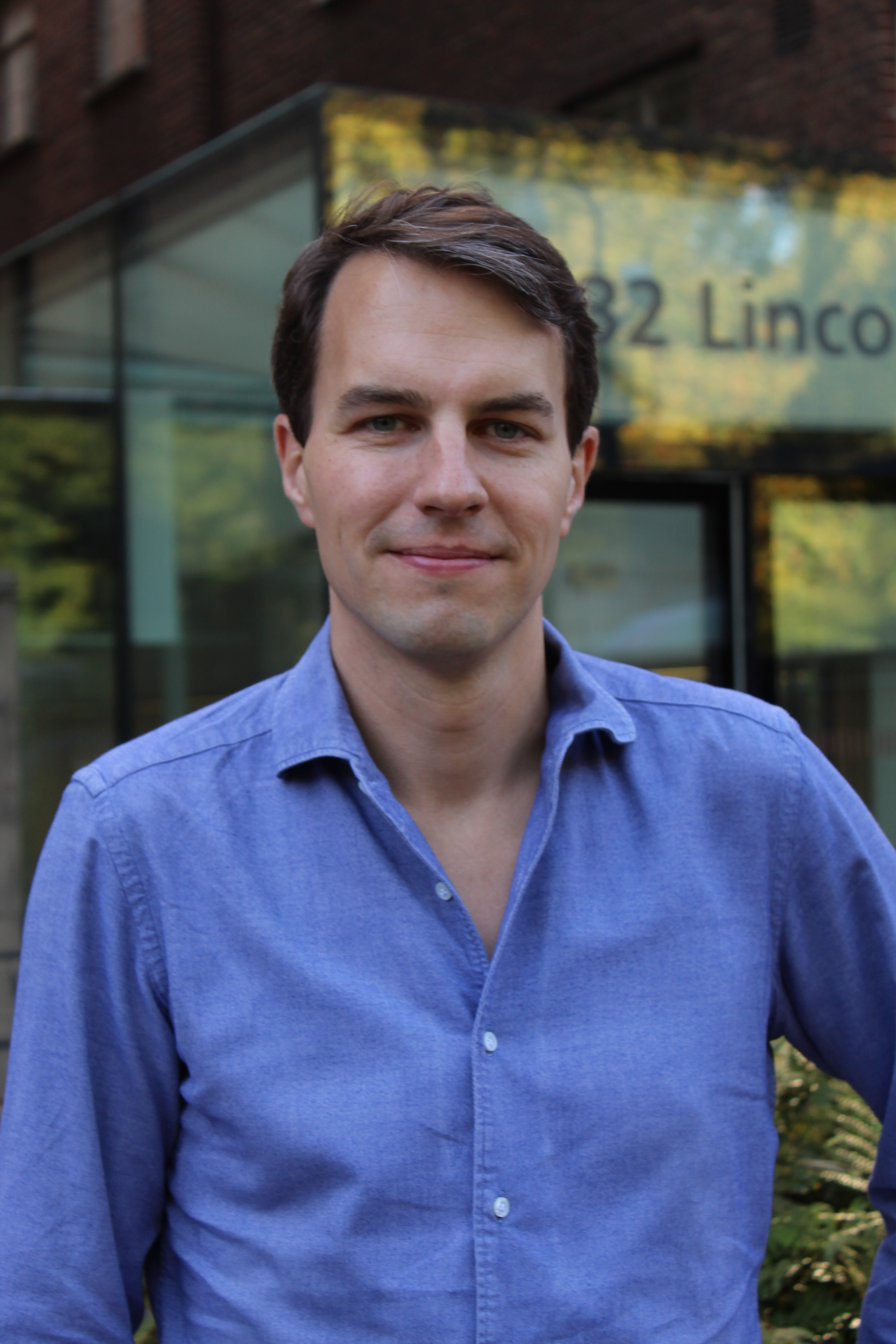
- Born: June 29, 1983 (age 43)

Academic background
- Education: University of Chicago (Ph.D., 2010); University College London (B.Sc., 2005)
- Influences: Robert M. Townsend; Robert E. Lucas, Jr.; Abhijit Banerjee

Academic work
- Discipline: Macroeconomics
- Institutions: London School of Economics
- Notable ideas: HANK; Continuous-time methods
- Awards: Alfred P. Sloan Research Fellowship (2016); Best European macroeconomist under the age of 40, Bernacer prize (2017); Leverhulme Prize (2019); Economics in Central Banking Award (2019); Calvó-Armengol International Prize (2024)

Benjamin Moll (born June 29, 1983) is a German macroeconomist who is the Sir John Hicks Chair and Professor of Economics at the London School of Economics. He is the recipient of the 2024 Calvó-Armengol International Prize for his "groundbreaking contributions on the role of heterogeneity, whether pertaining to individuals or the constraints they face" and the 2017 Bernacer Prize for his "path-breaking contributions to incorporate consumer and firm heterogeneity into macroeconomic models and use such models to study rich interactions between inequality and the macroeconomy".

== Education and career ==
Benjamin Moll earned a BSc in economics from University College London in 2005, followed by a PhD in economics from the University of Chicago in 2010, under the supervision of Robert Townsend, Fernando Alvarez, Francisco Buera and Robert Lucas. After his PhD, he joined Princeton University where he was an Assistant Professor from 2011 to 2017, Associate Professor from 2017 to 2018, and Professor from 2018 to 2019. In 2019, he moved to the London School of Economics.

== Research ==
=== Cross-country income differences ===
In his earlier work, Moll showed that an important driving factor in determining the aggregate effects of poorly functioning credit markets is the persistence of idiosyncratic productivity shocks hitting producers. Higher persistence leads to smaller steady-state productivity losses and slower transition dynamics. He later reveals with David Lagakos, Tommaso Porzio, Nancy Qian and Todd Schoellman that wages increase twice as much with experience in rich countries compared to poor countries, supporting the claim that human capital accumulation plays a significant role in explaining cross-country income differences.

=== Heterogeneity in macroeconomics ===
In 2018, Moll together with Greg Kaplan and Gianluca Violante coin the term HANK (Heterogeneous Agent New Keynesian) model to describe the rising literature incorporating household heterogeneity into New-Keynesian models. They argue that monetary policy operates mostly via general equilibrium effects on the labor market, instead of the standard intertemporal substitution channel. This is due to a sizable share of households exhibiting high MPCs, whose spending behavior reacts strongly to changes in disposable income. As Ricardian equivalence fails in HANK models, the reaction of the fiscal authority to a monetary shock is key to determine the overall macroeconomic response.

=== Mean-field game theory ===
Moll developed and popularized a number of continuous-time methods for solving heterogeneous agent models. Together with mathematicians Yves Achdou, Jiequn Han, Jean-Michel Lasry, and Pierre-Louis Lions, he recasts general equilibrium models in continuous time using mean-field game theory. The standard Aiyagari model is boiled down to a system of two main equations: a Hamilton–Jacobi–Bellman equation associated with the optimal decision of the household, and an associated Fokker–Planck equation (Kolmogorov forward equation) governing the dynamics of the wealth distribution. This recasting allows for analytic solutions when the model is parsimonious enough. Moll and his coauthors popularized finite difference methods for solving numerically those continuous time models, which allows for gains in speed compared to discrete time models.

== Honors ==
- He has held visiting appointments at New York University, Stanford University, Massachusetts Institute of Technology, University of Chicago, Harvard University, and the London School of Economics,
- He has been co-editor, American Economic Journal: Macroeconomics, 2018-2020, Member of the editorial board, Review of Economic Studies, from 2020, and associate editor, Journal of Monetary Economics, February 2016 to December 2017,
- He received the Calvó-Armengol International Prize (2024), Leverhulme Prize (2019) and the Bernácer Prize (2018), and got the Alfred P. Sloan Research Fellowship (2016).
- Elected fellow of the European Economic Association in 2021.
