= Viñals =

Viñals is a surname. Notable people with the surname include:

- Jaime Viñals (born 1966), Guatemalan mountaineer
- José Viñals (born 1954), Spanish economist and businessman

== See also ==
- Viñales (disambiguation)
