= Harrison Hong =

Academic background
- Education: Massachusetts Institute of Technology (PhD 1997); University of California, Berkeley (BA 1992)
- Doctoral advisor: Glenn Ellison
- Awards: 2009 Fischer Black Prize
- Website: Information at IDEAS / RePEc

Harrison Hong is the Jr. Professor of Financial Economics at Columbia University. He was awarded the 2009 Fischer Black Prize by the American Finance Association, given biennially to a financial economics scholar under the age of 40 for significant original research that is relevant to finance practice.

He received his B.A. in economics and statistics with highest distinction from the University of California, Berkeley in 1992 and his Ph.D. in economics from the Massachusetts Institute of Technology in 1997. He was earlier the John Scully ’66 Professor of Economics and Finance at Princeton University. His research interests include behavioural finance and stock market efficiency, asset pricing and trading under market imperfections, incentives and biases in decision making, and organisational form and performance.
