= Martin Uribe =

Argentine economics professor

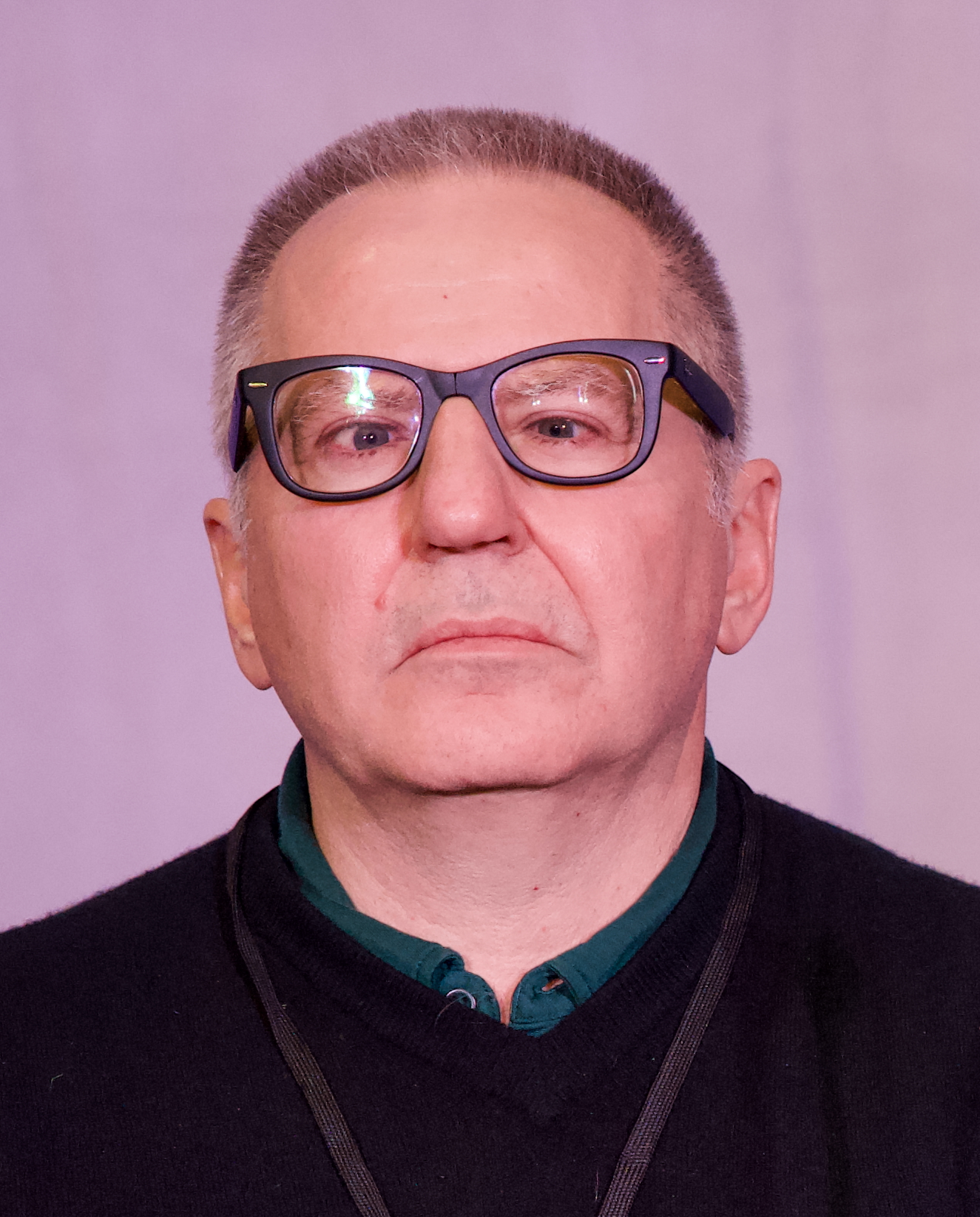
- Uribe at ASSA 2026
- Spouse: Stephanie Schmitt-Grohé

Academic background
- Education: University of Chicago (PhD); University of CEMA (MA); National University of Córdoba (BA)

Academic work
- Discipline: Economics
- School or tradition: New Keynesian economics
- Institutions: Columbia University
- Main interests: Macroeconomics, Monetary Policy

Martín Uribe is an Argentine professor of economics at Columbia University. He is currently the editor-in-chief of the Journal of International Economics.

== Biography ==
Uribe is born in Argentina. He received his B.A. from National University of Córdoba, M.A. from University of CEMA in Buenos Aires, and received his PhD from the University of Chicago in 1994. Uribe joined the Duke University faculty in 2003 after spending five years at the University of Pennsylvania and four years at the Board of Governors of the Federal Reserve System. He moved to Columbia University in 2008.

His research has focused on understanding the roots and impact of macroeconomic shocks and on the design of monetary, fiscal, and exchange-rate-based stabilization policies. He is also an associate researcher at the National Bureau of Economic Research.

In 2021, he was named editor-in-chief of the Journal of International Economics. He is considered one of the 12 most influential Argentine economists in the world.

Uribe is married to fellow economist Stephanie Schmitt-Grohé.
