= Thomas Philippon =

French economist (born 1974)

- Born: May 1974 (age 52)

Academic background
- Education: MIT, Paris School of Economics, EHESS, Ecole Polytechnique
- Doctoral advisor: Olivier Blanchard; Ricardo J. Caballero
- Awards: Bernácer Prize, Michael Brennan Award, Brattle Prize
- Website: Information at IDEAS / RePEc

Thomas Philippon (born May 1974) is a French economist and professor of finance at the New York University Stern School of Business.

== Career ==
Philippon earned a MA in Physics in 1997 from École Polytechnique, a Master in Economics in 1998 from the Paris School of Economics, and a PhD in Economics in 2003 from MIT. In 2003 he was hired as an Assistant Professor of Finance at Stern, and he has been a Professor of Finance since 2014.

In addition to his professorship at NYU, Philippon has held visiting positions at Columbia University, the University of Chicago, Yale University, and Princeton University. He joined the Monetary Policy Advisory Panel at the Federal Reserve Bank of New York in 2015. He also serves as the Scientific Committee Director at the French Prudential Supervisory Authority, as an associate editor of the American Economic Journal, and as a research associate at the National Bureau of Economic Research.

Ahead of the 2012 French presidential election, Philippon co-signed an appeal of several economists in support of candidate François Hollande.

According to Google Scholar, Philippon's academic papers have been cited nearly 5000 times in the past 5 years. Most notably his paper "CEO Incentives and Earnings Management" has been referenced over 2000 times.

== Awards ==
- He was named one of the ‘25 best economists under 45’ by the International Monetary Fund (IMF) in 2014.
- Bernácer Prize in 2013 for promoting economic research in Europe and for the best European economist under 40
- Brattle Prize in 2008 for the best article on corporate finance: "The Risk-Adjusted Cost of Financial Distress"
- Michael Brennan Award in 2009 for the paper "The Economics of Fraudulent Accounting"
- Econometric Society fellow in 2020

== Selected works ==
Books

- "Le Capitalisme d'héritiers. La crise française du travail." La République des Idées, Seuil, 2007, Prize for Best Book on Human Resources Management
- "The Great Reversal: How America Gave Up on Free Markets" Belknap Press, 2019, Amazon Best Sellers

Academic Articles

- "Has the U.S. Finance Industry Become Less Efficient?" (2014) (forthcoming in American Economic Review)
- "Efficiency and Cost-Benefit Analysis of the Financial System", forthcoming in the Journal of Legal Studies
- "An International Look at the Growth of Modern Finance" with Ariell Reshef, Journal of Economic Perspectives, 27(2), Spring 2013, pp. 73–96.
- "Efficient Recapitalization," with Philipp Schnabl, Journal of Finance, February 2013, lead article
- "Wages and Human Capital in the U.S. Financial Industry: 1909-2006," with Ariell Reshef, Quarterly Journal of Economics, November 2012, lead article
- "Optimal Interventions in Markets with Adverse Selection," with Vasiliki Skreta, American Economic Review, February 2012, lead article
- "Family Firms, Paternalism, and Labor Relations," with Holger Mueller, American Economic Journal: Macroeconomics, April 2011, 3(2): 218–45
- "Debt Overhang and Recapitalization in Closed and Open Economies," IMF Economic Review (inaugural issue), 2010
- "Financiers versus Engineers: Should the financial sector be taxed or subsidized?" American Economic Journal: Macroeconomics, July 2010, 2(3): 158–82.
- "The bond market's Q", Quarterly Journal of Economics, August 2009, 124(3), 1011–56
- "The economics of fraudulent accounting," with Simi Kedia, Review of Financial Studies, June 2009, Brennan & BlackRock Award 2010
- "Estimating Risk-Adjusted Costs of Financial Distress," with Heitor Almeida, Journal of Applied Corporate Finance, 2008
- "The risk-adjusted cost of financial distress," with Heitor Almeida, Journal of Finance, December 2007, lead article, Brattle Prize 2008
- "Firms and aggregate dynamics," with Francesco Franco, Review of Economics and Statistics, November 2007
- "Corporate governance over the business cycle," Journal of Economic Dynamics and Control, November 2006
- "CEO incentives and earnings management," with Daniel Bergstresser, Journal of Financial Economics, June 2006
- "The rise in firm-level volatility: causes and consequences," with Diego Comin, NBER Macroannuals, 2005
- "The impact of differential payroll tax subsidies on minimum wage employment", with Francis Kramarz Journal of Public Economics, 2001
