= Greg Kaplan =

American economist

Academic background
- Education: NYU (Ph.D., 2009); LSE (Msc., 2002)
- Doctoral advisors: Tom Sargent; Richard Blundell; Gianluca Violante

Academic work
- Discipline: Macroeconomics
- Institutions: University of Chicago
- Notable ideas: HANK; Wealthy hand-to-mouth
- Awards: Alfred P. Sloan Research Fellowship (2015); Economics in Central Banking Award (2019)

Greg Kaplan is the Alvin H. Baum Professor of Economics at the University of Chicago. His research encompasses macroeconomics, labor economics and applied microeconomics, with a focus on distributional issues.

== Education and career ==
Greg Kaplan graduated with a BCom from Macquarie University in 2000. He went on to further study at the London School of Economics and received an MSc in economics in 2002. He got a PhD from New York University in 2009. Following his graduation with a PhD from New York University in 2009, worked at the Federal Reserve Bank of Minneapolis for a year. He then became assistant professor at the University of Pennsylvania. He left Philadelphia for an assistant professorship at Princeton University in 2012 and was promoted to full professor in 2015. The University of Chicago appointed him professor in economics in 2016.

== Research ==
=== Household finance ===
In a 2014 paper with Gianluca Violante and Justin Weidner, Kaplan shows that a sizable share of households own little liquid wealth despite holding significant illiquid wealth. The authors call such households "wealthy hand-to-mouth". Because the wealthy hand-to-mouth have little liquid wealth they react strongly to transitory income shocks and therefore have high MPCs. This has important implications for fiscal and monetary policy (see HANK models). Kaplan further shows with Gianluca Violante that models featuring wealthy hand-to-mouth (i.e. with one liquid asset and one illiquid asset) yield aggregate responses to fiscal shocks one order of magnitude higher than standard one-asset models, consistent with empirical evidence.

=== Heterogeneous Agent New Keynesian models ===
In 2018, Kaplan together with Benjamin Moll and Gianluca Violante introduce the term HANK (Heterogeneous Agent New Keynesian) model to describe the rising literature incorporating household heterogeneity into New-Keynesian models. They argue that monetary policy operates mostly via general equilibrium effects on the labor market, instead of the standard intertemporal substitution channel. This is due to a sizable share of households exhibiting high MPCs, whose spending behavior reacts strongly to changes in disposable income. As Ricardian equivalence fails in HANK models, the reaction of the fiscal authority to a monetary shock is key to determine the overall macroeconomic response.

== Other activities ==
Kaplan is the founding Lead Editor of the academic journal JPE Macro. From 2018 to 2024, Kaplan was an Editor of the Journal of Political Economy. Since 2023 he has been a member of the board of the University of Chicago Press. He is a research associate at the National Bureau of Economic Research and a research fellow at the Institute for Fiscal Studies. He is also an economic consultant at the Federal Reserve Bank of Chicago.

In 2015 he received a Sloan Foundation fellowship. The Econometric Society elected him fellow in 2020.

=== e61 Institute ===
In 2021 Kaplan co-founded the non-partisan Australian economic research institute, e61 Institute together with Andrew Charlton. In 2022, Andrew Charlton was elected to Australia's House of Representatives as a member of the Australian Labour Party and stepped away from e61 in accordance with its non-partisan nature.

== Selected works ==
- Kaplan, Greg (2012). "Moving Back Home: Insurance against Labor Market Risk". Journal of Political Economy. 120 (3): 446–512. doi:10.1086/666588. S2CID 1624265.
- Kaplan, Greg; Violante, Giovanni; Weidner, Justin (2014). "The Wealthy Hand-to-Mouth". National Bureau of Economic Research Working Papers. 20073. doi:10.3386/w20073.
- Kaplan, Greg; Violante, Giovanni L. (2014). "A Model of the Consumption Response to Fiscal Stimulus Payments". Econometrica. 82 (4): 1199–1239. doi:10.3982/ECTA10528. S2CID 15993790.
- Kaplan, Greg; Moll, Benjamin; Violante, Giovanni L. (2018). "Monetary Policy According to HANK". American Economic Review. 108 (3): 697–743. doi:10.1257/aer.20160042. S2CID 31927674.
- Kaplan, Greg; Mitman, Kurt; Violante, Giovanni L. (2020). "The Housing Boom and Bust: Model Meets Evidence". Journal of Political Economy. 128 (9): 3285–3345. doi:10.1086/708816. S2CID 216213116.
- Bond, Steve; Hashemi, Arshia; Kaplan, Greg; Zoch, Piotr. (2021). "Some unpleasant markup arithmetic: Production function elasticities and their estimation from production data. Journal of Monetary Economics". Journal of Monetary Economics. 121:1-14.
