= Fischer Black Prize =

Fischer Black Prize is a memorial prize awarded in honor of Fischer Black that rewards individual financial research. The prize was established in 2002 and first awarded in 2003. It is awarded to a financial scientist for a body of work that demonstrates significant original research that is relevant to finance practice. Eligible scholars must either be below 40 years in age, or under age 45 but not have been awarded a Ph.D. (or equivalent) by age 35. The prize is awarded biennially at the American Finance Association's Annual Meeting. This award to honor a leading young finance scholar is analogous to the John Bates Clark Medal in economics and the Fields Medal in mathematics.

The award honors Fischer Black, a former General Partner at Goldman Sachs and Professor at the Massachusetts Institute of Technology. Among Black's notable research accomplishments was the development (with Myron Scholes) of the Black–Scholes option pricing model. The awardee is chosen for having a body of research that embodies the Fischer Black hallmark of developing original research. In years where no such candidate meets the rigorous standards, as was the case in 2005, no award is presented.

The Fischer Black Prize is one of two biennial awards presented by the American Finance Association (the other is the Morgan Stanley-American Finance Association Award For Excellence In Finance) in alternating years at its annual conference to scholars for bodies of research. The Association also awards two annual awards for individual research publications at its conference (Smith Breeden Prize and Brattle Prize).

== Past winners ==
Year	Recipients	Contribution	Institution (upon receipt)	Institution (current)	Alma mater (PhD)	Nationality
2003	Raghuram G. Rajan	Financial institution, Economic growth	University of Chicago	University of Chicago	Massachusetts Institute of Technology	India
2007	Tobias J. Moskowitz		University of Chicago	Yale SOM	University of California, Los Angeles	United States
2009	Harrison Hong	Behavioural Finance	Princeton University	Columbia University	Massachusetts Institute of Technology	United States
2011	Xavier Gabaix		New York University	Harvard University	Harvard University	France
2013	Ulrike Malmendier		University of California, Berkeley	University of California, Berkeley	Harvard University, University of Bonn	Germany
2015	Yuliy Sannikov		Princeton University	Stanford University	Stanford University	Ukraine
2017	Amir Sufi	Macrofinance, Subprime mortgage crisis	University of Chicago	University of Chicago	Massachusetts Institute of Technology	United States
2019	Ralph Koijen	Insurance, Macrofinance	University of Chicago	University of Chicago	Tilburg University	Netherlands
2021	Matteo Maggiori	Exchange rates, International finance	Stanford University	Stanford University	UC Berkeley	Italy
2023	Johannes Stroebel	climate finance, household finance	New York University	New York University	Stanford University	Germany
2025	Tyler Muir	intermediary asset pricing, macrofinance	UCLA	UCLA	Northwestern	
