= Roland Fryer =

American economist

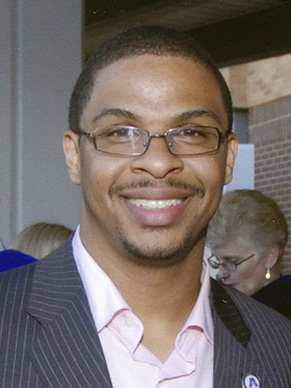
- Born: Roland Gerhard Fryer Jr. June 4, 1977 (age 49); Daytona Beach, Florida, U.S.
- Occupations: Economist, professor
- Spouse: Franziska Michor
- Awards: MacArthur Fellowship (2011); Calvó-Armengol Prize (2012); John Bates Clark Medal (2015)

Academic background
- Education: University of Texas at Arlington (BA); Pennsylvania State University (PhD)
- Thesis: Mathematical Models of Discrimination and Inequality
- Doctoral advisor: Tomas Sjöström
- Influences: Gary Becker; Steven Levitt; Glenn Loury

Academic work
- Discipline: Economics
- Institutions: Harvard University (2006–present)

Roland Gerhard Fryer Jr. (born June 4, 1977) is an American economist and professor at Harvard University.

Fryer joined the faculty of Harvard University and rapidly rose through the academic ranks; in 2007, at age 30, he became one of the youngest professors (economists Jeffrey Sachs and Lawrence H. Summers both received tenure at 28), and the youngest African American, ever to be awarded tenure at Harvard. He has received numerous awards, including a MacArthur "Genius" Fellowship in 2011 and the John Bates Clark Medal in 2015—the field of economics' highest award second only to the Nobel Prize.

Fryer has led research on social issues including social image and segregation, race and ethnicity, and the U.S. racial achievement gap. In 2019, he published an analysis arguing that Black and Hispanic Americans were no more likely than white Americans to be shot by police in a given interaction with police.

== Early life and education ==
Fryer grew up in Lewisville, Texas, where he had moved with his abusive alcoholic father at the age of 4. Fryer's mother left when he was very young, and his father, who beat his son, was convicted of rape, leaving Fryer on his own. He became a "full fledged gangster by his teens."

Fryer attended Lewisville High School, where he started in football and basketball. He earned an athletic scholarship to the University of Texas at Arlington for basketball. However, he never actually played for the Texas–Arlington Mavericks; instead he decided to embrace academics, joining the Honors College, whose dean helped find him an academic scholarship. He graduated in 1998 with a bachelor's degree magna cum laude in economics after two-and-a-half years of study while working full time at a McDonald's drive-thru.

Fryer then did doctoral study in economics at Pennsylvania State University, receiving a Ph.D. in 2002.

He then did postdoctoral research at the University of Chicago with Nobel laureate economist Gary Becker.

Fryer has collaborated with several other academics, including Steven Levitt, the University of Chicago economist and author of Freakonomics, Glenn Loury, a Brown University economist, and Edward Glaeser, an urban economist at Harvard.

Upon completing a three-year fellowship with the Harvard Society of Fellows at the end of the 2005–2006 academic year, Fryer joined Harvard's economics department as an assistant professor.

In 2005, Fryer was also selected as one of the first Fletcher Foundation Fellows.

== Academic career ==
By 2005, Fryer was regarded as one of Black America's and Harvard's rising academic stars, after publishing numerous economics-related papers in prominent academic journals.

In 2007, at age 30, he became one of the youngest professors, and youngest African American, to ever receive tenure at Harvard (Noam Elkies was 26). Fryer began his research career as an applied theorist, developing models of social image and measures of segregation. His research subsequently moved into empirical issues, especially those connected with race.

Also in 2007, New York City Mayor Michael Bloomberg appointed Fryer to be the New York City Department of Education's Chief Equality Officer. Fryer both inspired and oversaw the Opportunity NYC project, which studied how students in low-performing schools respond to financial incentives, offering as much as $500 for "doing well on standardized tests and showing up for class."

In 2009, Fryer formed the Education Innovation Laboratory at Harvard University, and served as its director until its closure following Fryer's harassment controversy (below) ten years later in 2019.

In 2011, he was named a MacArthur Fellow and received the 2015 John Bates Clark Medal.

Fryer is a research associate of the National Bureau of Economic Research, and a member of the NBER Economics of Education (EE) and Labor Studies (LS) programs.

== Police shootings research ==
In 2016, Fryer published a controversial working paper concluding that although minorities (African Americans and Hispanics) are more likely to experience police use of force than whites, they were not more likely to be shot by police than whites in a given interaction with police. (Note: Fryer, Roland Gerhard (July 2016). An Empirical Analysis of Racial Differences in Police Use of Force (PDF) (Report). NBER Working Papers (Revised January 2018 ed.). National Bureau of Economic Research. doi:10.3386/w22399. OCLC 956328193. S2CID 158634577. JEL № J01, K0. Archived (PDF) from the original on 31 October 2020; "NBER working papers are circulated for discussion and comment purposes. They have not been peer-reviewed or been subject to the review by the NBER Board of Directors that accompanies official NBER publications."; published in J Polit Econ June 2019.) The paper generated considerable controversy and criticism.

Fryer responded to some of these criticisms in an interview with The New York Times. In 2019, Fryer's paper was published in the Journal of Political Economy.

A 2019 study by Princeton University political scientists disputed the findings by Fryer, saying that if police had a higher threshold for stopping whites, this might mean that the whites, Hispanics and blacks in Fryer's data are not similar. (Note: Knox, Dean; Lowe, Will; Mummolo, Jonathan (21 December 2019). "The Bias Is Built In: Administrative Records Mask Racially Biased Policing". American Political Science Review. 114 (3) (Revised 18 May 2020 ed.): 619–637. doi:10.1017/S0003055420000039. ISSN 0003-0554. OCLC 8678024977. SSRN 3336338; minor correction in August 2020.) Nobel-laureate James Heckman and Steven Durlauf, both University of Chicago economists, published a response to the Fryer study, writing that the paper "does not establish credible evidence on the presence or absence of discrimination against African Americans in police shootings" due to issues with selection bias. Fryer responded by saying Durlauf and Heckman erroneously claim that his sample is "based on stops," and that the "vast majority of the data [...] is gleaned from 911 calls for service in which a civilian requests police presence."

== Harassment controversy ==
In March 2018, Harvard barred Fryer from his research lab, the Education Innovation Laboratory (EdLabs), upon launching an investigation into Title IX complaints against him alleging sexual harassment.

Fryer responded that he was "unfairly scrutinized ... for his skin color." Harvard confirmed that its Office for Dispute Resolution (ODR) received complaints against Fryer in January, March, and April 2018. The investigation found that he had made references over text to various colleagues engaging in sex acts according to The New York Times, though no physical actions were alleged.

Upon completing their investigation, the recommendation of ODR was Fryer should be required to take "workplace sensitivity training". This recommendation for training was passed to a panel of Harvard tenured faculty including Lawrence D. Bobo and Claudine Gay.

In December 2018, Fryer resigned from the executive committee of the American Economic Association, to which he had been elected (but on which he had not yet taken up his seat); Fryer submitted his resignation after coming under pressure from fellow economists to step down due to the sexual harassment allegations against him. In a letter to The New York Times later that month, Fryer expressed regret for having "allowed, encouraged and participated" in a collegial atmosphere at EdLabs that included "off-color jokes".

In July 2019, the faculty panel suspended Fryer from the Harvard faculty for two years without pay. Harvard determined that upon Fryer's return to the faculty, he would be barred from serving as an adviser or supervisor, from access to graduate fellows, and from teaching graduate workshops, but permitted him to teach graduate classes. Fryer had been one of Harvard's most highly paid professors. Harvard permanently closed EdLabs in September 2019. In 2021, Harvard allowed Fryer to return to teaching and research.

== Awards and honors ==
In 2008 The Economist listed Fryer as one of the top eight young economists in the world. In 2011, Fryer was a recipient of a MacArthur Fellowship, commonly referred to as a "Genius Grant". He is the recipient of the 2015 John Bates Clark Medal, awarded by the American Economic Association to "that American economist under the age of forty who is judged to have made the most significant contribution to economic thought and knowledge." He is a fellow of the American Academy of Arts and Sciences. He is also a recipient of the Calvó-Armengol International Prize and the Presidential Early Career Award for Scientists and Engineers. At the age of 30, he became the youngest African American to receive tenure at Harvard.

== Personal life ==
Fryer is married to Franziska Michor, a professor of biology at Harvard. They met in 2006, as members of the Harvard Society of Fellows. He "courted her by betting a dinner date on whether he could find evidence that smoking reduces cancer."

Fryer has performed stand-up comedy at The Elbow Room, in West Hartford, Connecticut, inside of their basement comedy club "Stand-Up Underground."

== Selected works ==
- Roland G. Fryer Jr.; Steven D. Levitt (May 2004). "Understanding the black-white test score gap in the first two years of school" (PDF). The Review of Economics and Statistics. 86 (2).
- Roland G. Fryer Jr.; Steven D. Levitt (2004). "The Causes and Consequences of Distinctively Black Names" (PDF). Quarterly Journal of Economics. 119 (3): 767–805. doi:10.1162/0033553041502180. S2CID 150126139. Archived from the original (PDF) on 5 March 2009.
- Roland G. Fryer Jr. (2014). "Injecting Charter School Best Practices Into Traditional Public Schools: Evidence from Field Experiments". Quarterly Journal of Economics. 129 (3): 1355–1407. doi:10.1093/qje/qju011.
- Roland G. Fryer Jr. (2019). "An Empirical Analysis of Racial Differences in Police Use of Force". Journal of Political Economy. 127 (3): 1210–1261. doi:10.1086/701423. S2CID 158634577.
