= Germán Bernácer =

Spanish economist (1883–1965)

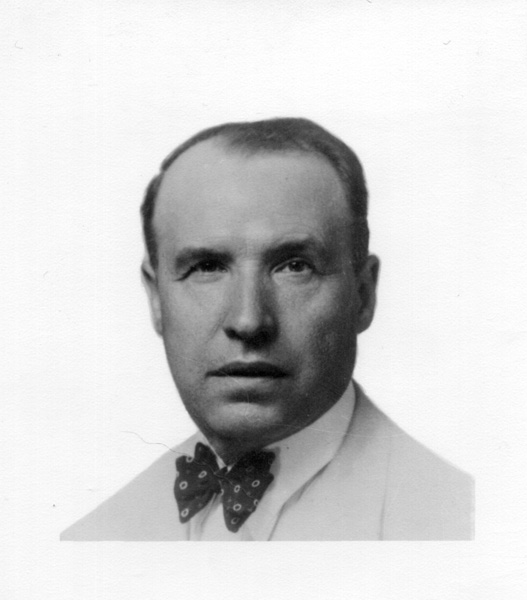

Germán Bernácer Tormo (born 29 July 1883 in Alicante - died June 1965) was an economist from Spain.

== See also ==
- Germán Bernácer Prize
