= Matteo Maggiori =

Italian economist (born 1982)

- Born: November 1, 1982 (age 43)

Academic background
- Education: UC Berkeley (Ph.D., 2012)

Academic work
- Discipline: international macroeconomics and finance
- Institutions: Stanford University
- Notable ideas: Exchange Rate Models with Financial Frictions; International Role of the Dollar
- Awards: Bernacer Prize (2022); Andrew Carnegie Fellow (2022); Fischer Black Prize (2021); Guggenheim Fellow (2019); Carlo Alberto Medal (2019).

Matteo Maggiori (born November 1, 1982) is an Italian economist and the Moghadam Family Professor of Finance at the Stanford Graduate School of Business. His research is in international macroeconomics and finance. He is the co-founder and director of the Global Capital Allocation Project, a research lab that studies how capital moves around the world to design better international economic policies. He received several awards, including the 2021 Fisher Black Prize or an outstanding financial economist and the 2022 German Bernacer Prize for outstanding contributions in the fields of macroeconomics and finance. Maggiori has made a fundamental contribution to the economics of exchange rates. There is little doubt that his research has single-handedly moved FX research in a promising, novel direction.

== Research ==
His research is both theoretical and empirical and has included the analysis of exchange rate dynamics, global capital allocations, the international monetary system, reserve currencies, tax havens and offshore financial centers, the role of expectations in households' portfolio choice, and the effect of very long-run discount rates on climate finance.

Together with Xavier Gabaix, Maggiori designed a model of exchange rate determination based on limited financial intermediation. In the Gabaix-Maggiori model, financial intermediaries earn a currency risk premium as compensation for currency exposure. As the intermediaries’ risk-bearing capacity increases, currency risk premia disappear, and uncovered interest parity is restored in FX markets. The Gabaix-Maggiori model revives and formalizes an older approach to exchange rate determination, the portfolio balance approach of Penti Kouri, that puts international capital flows front and center.

Maggiori has also developed models of the international monetary system that put limited risk bearing capacity of financial institutions and the fiscal capacity of the US government as foundations for the role of the dollar as a reserve currency. He highlighted the "reserve currency paradox", the fact that the US dollar appreciates during crises, even when the crises are centered in the US.

Together with Brent Neiman and Jesse Schreger, Maggiori documented new facts about global financial markets. They documented home-currency-bias, the tendency of investors to overweight bonds denominated in the investors’ domestic currency even while investing in foreign countries. They showed that the dollar is the only exception.

He is a contributor to the public debate on international economic policy in both the international and Italian media.

== Honors ==
He received the 2021 Fisher Black Prize for an outstanding financial economist. He was awarded the 2022 German Bernacer Prize that is awarded annually to a European economist under age 40 who is judged to have made outstanding contributions in the fields of macroeconomics and finance. In 2019, he received the Carlo Alberto Medal that rewards an Italian scholar under the age of 40 for outstanding contributions to economics. He also received a Guggenheim Fellowship and a Carnegie Fellowship.
