= Gianluca Violante =

Gianluca Violante is a professor of economics at Princeton University whose research interests span macroeconomics, labor economics, and public finance. He received the 2019 Central Banking Prize for Economics in Central Banking for his work on HANK models.

== Education and career ==
Violante received a Laurea in Economics from the University of Torino in 1992, and a Ph.D. in economics from the University of Pennsylvania in 1997. Between 1997 and 2002 he taught at University College London before joining New York University as an assistant professor in 2002. He received a full professorship in 2011 and joined Princeton University in 2016. He is a fellow of the Econometric Society and won the 2019 economics in central banking award of the Central Banking Institute.

== Research ==
=== Household finance ===
In a 2014 paper with Greg Kaplan and Justin Weidner, Violante shows that a sizable share of households own little liquid wealth despite holding significant illiquid wealth. The authors call such households "wealthy hand-to-mouth". Because the wealthy hand-to-mouth have little liquid wealth they react strongly to transitory income shocks and therefore have high MPCs. This has important implications for fiscal and monetary policy (see HANK models). The paper further shows that models featuring wealthy hand-to-mouth (i.e. with one liquid asset and one illiquid asset) yield aggregate responses to fiscal shocks one order of magnitude higher than standard one-asset models, consistent with empirical evidence.

=== Heterogeneous Agent New Keynesian models ===
In 2018, Violante together with Benjamin Moll and Greg Kaplan introduce the term HANK (Heterogeneous Agent New Keynesian) model to describe the rising literature incorporating household heterogeneity into New-Keynesian models. They argue that monetary policy operates mostly via general equilibrium effects on the labor market, instead of the standard intertemporal substitution channel. This is due to a sizable share of households exhibiting high MPCs, whose spending behavior reacts strongly to changes in disposable income. As Ricardian equivalence fails in HANK models, the reaction of the fiscal authority to a monetary shock is key to determine the overall macroeconomic response.
