= Calvó-Armengol International Prize =

Biannual award for economists

The Calvó-Armengol International Prize is awarded every two years by the Barcelona School of Economics (BSE) and the Government of Andorra to a top researcher in Economics or the social sciences who is not older than 40 years old for significant contributions to the theory and comprehension of the mechanisms of social interaction.

== Prize history ==
The Calvó-Armengol Prize honors the memory of BSE Affiliated Professor and ICREA-UAB Professor Antoni Calvó-Armengol (1970-2007). a highly esteemed researcher from Andorra who died unexpectedly in November 2007 at the age of 37.

The Calvó-Armengol Prize was awarded for the first time in 2010 to Esther Duflo (MIT). In 2019, Duflo became the first recipient of the Calvó-Armengol Prize to be awarded the Nobel Memorial Prize in Economic Sciences.

== Award process ==
There is an open call for nominations, after which a winner is chosen by a Prize Selection Committee appointed by BSE.

The name of the winner is usually announced in October, and the award ceremony takes place the following June in Andorra.

In addition, the Prize recipient delivers the Calvó-Armengol Prize Lecture in Barcelona.

The Prize also includes a cash award of 30,000 euros.

== Prize laureates ==
Award Year	Prize Recipient	Recipient's Institution
2025	Johannes Stroebel	New York University (NYU)
2023	Benjamin Moll	London School of Economics
2021	Stefanie Stantcheva	Harvard University
2019	Benjamin Golub	Northwestern University (Harvard University at the time of award)
2017	Melissa Dell	Harvard University
2015	Matthew Gentzkow	Stanford University
2013	Raj Chetty	Harvard University
2011	Roland Fryer	Harvard University
2009	Esther Duflo	Massachusetts Institute of Technology (MIT)

== See also ==
- List of economics awards
- List of social sciences awards
- John Bates Clark Medal
- MacArthur Fellowship
- Nobel Memorial Prize in Economic Sciences
