= Hélène Rey =

French economist

- Born: 1970 (age 55–56); Brioude, France

Academic background
- Education: London School of Economics
- Doctoral advisor: Charles Bean; George de Menil; Nobuhiro Kiyotaki

Academic work
- Institutions: Bank for International Settlements; London Business School (LBS)
- Awards: Officer of the British Empire; Chevalier de l'Ordre National du Mérite; Alfred P. Sloan Research Fellowship; Bernácer Prize; Birgit Grodal Award; Yrjö Jahnsson Award; Carl Menger Preis; Maurice Allais Prize; Prix Turgot; Adam Smith Award; Toulouse Banque de France Senior Prize; Harms Prize Kiel Institute
- Website: Information at IDEAS / RePEc

Hélène Rey OBE (born 1970) is an economist who has served as Economic Adviser and Head of the Monetary and Economic Department at the Bank for International Settlements (BIS) since 1 September 2026. She was previously the Lord Raj Bagri Professor of Economics at London Business School (LBS).

Her work focuses on international macroeconomics and finance with an emphasis on international capital flows, exchange rate dynamics, financial imbalances, financial crises and the international monetary system. She is internationally known for introducing the concept of the global financial cycle and challenging the Mundellian Trilemma as well as estimating the exorbitant privilege of the United States.

Rey is vice-president of the Center for Economic Policy Research (CEPR) and president of the European Economic Association in 2025. She is a fellow of the Econometric Society, the British Academy, the European Economic Association, the American Academy of Arts and Sciences, a foreign correspondent of the French Académie des Sciences Morales et Politiques, and a foreign honorary member of the American Economic Association. She is also a member of the Group of Thirty, the Bellagio Group, and of the external advisory group to the managing director of the International Monetary Fund (IMF). She was previously a member of the French Haut Conseil de Stabilité Financière, the Conseil d'Analyse Économique, and the Autorité de Contrôle Prudentiel et de Résolution.

== Early life and education ==
The daughter of a teacher and an engineer, Rey was born in Brioude in South-Central France in 1970, where she was educated at the Collège et Lycée La Fayette until her baccalaureate. She prepared national competitive scientific exams in the Lycée Blaise Pascal in Clermont-Ferrand.

Rey then received her undergraduate degree from ENSAE Paris in 1994 and a Master of Science degree in Engineering Economic Systems from Stanford University the same year. She has Ph.Ds from Ecole des Hautes Etudes en Sciences Sociales and London School of Economics, both in 1998.

== Career ==
After working as a lecturer at LSE from 1997–2000, Rey was assistant professor and later professor (2006) at Princeton University where she also worked at Bendheim Center for Finance and Woodrow Wilson School. (2000-2006). She also was a visitor at Berkeley and the National Bureau of Economic Research (NBER) from 1999 to 2000. She then became a professor of Economics (2007), and later the Lord Raj Bagri professor of Economics (2016), at the London Business School (LBS), before joining the Bank for International Settlements in September 2026.

Rey was a member of the Conseil d'Analyse Économique which advises the French Prime Minister on economic matters from 2010 to 2012, and since 2012 has been a member of the Commission Economique de la Nation which advises the Finance Minister of France.

Rey is a regular contributor the French magazine Les Échos. She became a co-editor of the Annual Review of Economics as of 2019.

== Economic research ==
Rey focuses her research on the determinants and consequences of financial trade and economic imbalances, the theory of financial crisis, and how the international monetary system is organized. Through her research, she has shown that certain countries different gross external asset positions help them predict future financial positions along with their exchange rates.

Rey is credited with ground-breaking research into the structure of international payments and capital flows. By examining the balance sheets of creditor and debtor nations, she offered new insights into relative returns on cross-border investments. She explained her approach in an interview with the Financial Times, which wrote, "She also showed why the US is the world's banker. "We called it 'the US's exorbitant privilege'. The US earns more on external assets than it pays on external liabilities. It has an excess return on the order of 2 per cent ... So it issues a lot of government bonds that are happily bought by the rest of the world."

== Other activities ==
- Cercle des économistes, Member
- Centre de Recerca en Economia Internacional (CREI), Pompeu Fabra University (UPF), Member of the Advisory Board
- Centre for European Reform (CER), Member of the Advisory Board
- French Prudential Supervision and Resolution Authority (ACPR), Member of the Board (2010-2014)
- Regular column writer for French newspaper Les Echos

== Personal life ==
Rey is married to fellow professor of economics Richard Portes and the couple have a daughter. They live in London.

== Awards and recognition ==
- Review of Economic Studies Tour (1997)
- Centre for Economic Policy Research (CEPR) Research Fellow (1999-)
- National Bureau of Economic Research (NBER) Research Associate (2001-)
- Alfred P. Sloan Fellowship (2005)
- Germán Bernácer Prize (2006)
- Elected Member of the Council of the European Economic Association (2008–11)
- Elected Member of the Council of the Royal Economic Society (2008–13)
- Member of the World Economic Forum Global Agenda Council (2010–17)
- Fellow of the British Academy (2011-)
- Inaugural Birgit Grodal Award (2012)
- Fellow of the European Economic Association (2013-)
- Fellow of the Econometric Society (2013-)
- First woman to win Yrjö Jahnsson Award, shared with Thomas Piketty (2013)
- Inaugural Carl Menger Preis (2014)
- Named one of 25 brightest young economists by the International Monetary Fund. (2014)
- Prix de la Fondation Edouard Bonnefous de l'Institut de France, Académie des Sciences Morales et Politiques (2015)
- Elected Foreign Member of the American Academy of Arts and Sciences (2016-)
- O.B.E for services to Economics (2016)
- Grand Prix de l'Économie (2017)
- Maurice Allais Prize (2017)
- Elected Foreign Correspondant of the Académie des Sciences Morales et Politiques (2018-)
- Elected Council and Executive Committee Member, Econometric Society (2019-)
- Prix Turgot (Grand Prix d'Honneur) (2020)
- Foreign Honorary Member of the American Economic Association (2020-)
- Vice President of the Center for Economic Policy Research (CEPR) (2020-)
- Asian Bureau of Finance and Economic Research (ABFER) Fellow (2022-)
- Adam Smith Award (National Association of Business Economics) (2023)
- Chevalier de l'Ordre National du Mérite (2024)
- Bernhard Harms Prize, Kiel Institute for the World Economy (2024)
- Senior Prize Banque de France and Toulouse School of Economics (2024)
- President of the European Economic Association (2025)

== Selected works ==
=== Book chapters ===
- Rey, Hélène; Gourinchas, Pierre-Olivier (2014). "External adjustment, global imbalances and valuation effects". Handbook of International Economics. Vol. 4. pp. 585–645.
- Rey, Hélène (2013). "Comment on "time to ship during financial crises"". In Giavazzi, Francesco; West, Kenneth D. (eds.). NBER International Seminar on Macroeconomics 2012. Chicago, Illinois: National Bureau of Economic Research. pp. 261–263. ISBN 9780226053271.
- Rey, Hélène; Gourinchas, Pierre-Olivier (2007). "From World Banker to World Venture Capitalist: U.S. External Adjustment and the Exorbitant Privilege". G7 Current Account Imbalances: Sustainability and Adjustment. doi:10.3386/w11563.

=== Journal articles ===
- Rey, Hélène; Portes, Richard (March 2005). "The determinants of cross-border equity flows" (PDF). Journal of International Economics. 65 (2): 269–296. doi:10.1016/j.jinteco.2004.05.002.
- Rey, Hélène; Gourinchas, Pierre-Olivier (2007). "International financial adjustment". Journal of Political Economy. 115 (4): 665–703. CiteSeerX 10.1.1.331.4666. doi:10.1086/521966.
- Rey, Hélène; Imbs, Jean M.; Mumtaz, Haroon; Ravn, Morten O. (December 2010). "One TV, one price?". The Scandinavian Journal of Economics. 112 (4). Wiley: 753–781. doi:10.1111/j.1467-9442.2010.01631.x. S2CID 16487106.
- Rey, Hélène; Gourinchas, Pierre-Olivier; Truempler, Kai (November 2012). "The financial crisis and the geography of wealth transfers". Journal of International Economics. 88 (2): 266–283. doi:10.1016/j.jinteco.2012.05.008. S2CID 1096559.
- Coeurdacier, Nicolas; Rey, Hélène (2013). "Home Bias in Open Economy Financial Macroeconomics" (PDF). Journal of Economic Literature. 51 (1): 63–115. doi:10.1257/jel.51.1.63. S2CID 54926472.
- Rey, Hélène; Passari, Evgenia (2015). "Financial Flows and the International Monetary System". Economic Journal. 125 (584): 675–698. doi:10.1111/ecoj.12268. S2CID 9067115.

=== Papers ===
- Rey, Hélène (May 2015). "Dilemma not trilemma: the global financial cycle and monetary policy independence". NBER Working Paper No. 21162. doi:10.3386/w21162.
