= Johannes Stroebel =

Economist

Johannes Stroebel is the David S. Loeb Professor of Finance in the Finance Department at the Leonard N. Stern School of Business of New York University (NYU). He conducts research in climate finance, household finance, social network analysis, macroeconomics, and real estate economics. He is a Research Associate of the National Bureau of Economic Research.

== Education ==
Stroebel received his Ph.D. in economics from Stanford University in 2012.

== Career ==
Stroebel joined the Leonard N. Stern School of Business of New York University in 2013. He is currently a Research Associate of the National Bureau of Economic Research, a Research Director of the Volatility and Risk Institute at NYU Stern, and a Research Director of the Center for Global Economy and Business at NYU Stern.

== Awards ==
- Calvó-Armengol International Prize in 2025 "for his pioneering contributions to our understanding of how social connections, beliefs, and interactions shape economic and financial outcomes"
- Brattle Prize in 2016 for the paper "Asymmetric Information about Collateral Values"
- Fischer Black Prize in 2023
