= Melissa Dell =

American economist

- Born: 1983 or 1984 (age 42–43); Enid, Oklahoma, U.S.
- Education: Harvard University (BA); Trinity College, Oxford (MPhil); Massachusetts Institute of Technology (PhD)
- Children: 2
- Awards: Sloan Fellowship (2016); Carnegie Fellowship (2017); Calvó-Armengol International Prize (2018); Elaine Bennett Research Prize (2018); John Bates Clark Medal (2020)
- Scientific career
- Fields: Economics
- Workplaces: Harvard University
- Doctoral advisors: Daron Acemoglu
- Website: https://scholar.harvard.edu/dell/home

Melissa Dell (born 1983 or 1984) is an American economist who is the Andrew E. Furer Professor of Economics at Harvard University. Her research interests include development economics, computational economics, political economy, and economic history.

== Early life and education ==
Dell grew up in Enid, Oklahoma, where she attended Oklahoma Bible Academy. Despite difficulties completing races because of her poor eyesight, she was a champion long-distance runner in high school, setting a state record in the 3000-meter distance. As of 2010, she was an ultramarathon (100 km) runner. Her parents worked as civilian contractors at Vance Air Force Base, in the parts shop and at the daycare. She was the first student from her high school to attend Harvard University, which she was able to attend because of generous financial aid. There, she established an organization, "College Matters," and wrote a book, The College Matters Guide to Getting Into the Elite College of Your Dreams, to offer practical advice to ambitious students from similar backgrounds.

She graduated summa cum laude from Harvard University in 2005 (B.A. economics), where she competed on the track team, and attended Trinity College, Oxford, as a Rhodes Scholar, receiving an M.Phil. in economics in 2007. In 2012, she completed her Ph.D. in economics at the Massachusetts Institute of Technology. She was a Junior Fellow of the Harvard Society of Fellows from 2012 to 2014, and joined the faculty at Harvard in 2014 as an assistant professor. She was promoted to Full Professor in 2018.

== Research ==
Dell's research interests include development economics, economic history, and political economy, with a major focus on areas of Latin America and Southeast Asia. The main focus of her work has been explaining economic development through the persistence of historical institutions.

One of her most cited research papers, “The Persistent Effects of Peru’s Mining Mita,” published in the scholarly journal Econometrica in 2010, discusses Peru's Mining Mita and the long-term effects of colonial-era forced labor on the local populations centuries later.

For example, in her paper on the long-term effects of Peru's mining mita, she showed that current development outcomes were influenced by whether regions were included in forced labor policies that ended in the early 1800s. This paper was also methodologically important, as it was one of the first in economics to use a spatial regression discontinuity design. Dell has also investigated the effect of conflict on labor market and political outcomes and vice versa. She also has influential work on the economic effects of climate, especially for developing economies. Much of her research has focused on Latin America and Southeast Asia.

== Selected works ==
- Dell (2010). "The Persistent Effects of Peru's Mining Mita". Econometrica. 78 (6): 1863–1903. doi:10.3982/ecta8121.
- Dell, Melissa, Benjamin F. Jones, and Benjamin A. Olken. "Temperature shocks and economic growth: Evidence from the last half century." American Economic Journal: Macroeconomics 4, no. 3 (2012): 66–95.
- Dell, Melissa, Benjamin F. Jones, and Benjamin A. Olken. "What do we learn from the weather? The new climate-economy literature." Journal of Economic Literature 52, no. 3 (2014): 740–98.
- Dell, Melissa. "Trafficking networks and the Mexican drug war." American Economic Review 105, no. 6 (2015): 1738–79.
- Dell, Melissa, and Pablo Querubin. "Nation building through foreign intervention: Evidence from discontinuities in military strategies." The Quarterly Journal of Economics 133, no. 2 (2018): 701–764.
