= Concours général =

French student academic competition

In France, the Concours Général (French pronunciation: [kɔ̃kuʁ ʒeneʁal]), created in 1747, is the most prestigious academic competition held every year between students of Première (11th grade) and Terminale (12th and final grade) in almost all subjects taught in both general, technological and professional high schools. Exams usually take place in March, and their results are known in June or July. Students who show great ability in one field are selected to participate by their teachers and their school principal.

Most of the time, no more than one student per high school is allowed to participate in the competition, which requires strong knowledge of college level topics (Some "elite" high schools sometimes depart from this rule, presenting dozens of students, such as the Lycée Louis-Le-Grand, the Lycée Saint-Louis de Gonzague or the Lycée Henri IV in Paris).

In the humanities and social sciences, the exams involve one or more essays and last 6 hours. In the sciences, the exams last almost as long and are problem-based.

In a given subject, up to 18 awards can be given:

- up to 3 Prizes. A student winning a prize takes part in a ceremony held in the main amphitheatre of the Sorbonne University, where they are given the diploma and congratulated by the Minister of Education and members of the government.
- up to 5 Accessits
- up to 10 Regional awards

A student who wins any of the above is called a "lauréat du Concours Général". In Mathematics, the "Lauréat" is invited to a series of conferences at the Institute Poincaré and is usually selected to attend the Clay Institute summer school of science.

== Current list of subjects ==
Students of 11th grade only (all series):

- French
- History
- Geography
- Latin-French translation (version latine)
- French-Latin translation (thème latin)
- Greek-French translation (version grecque)

Students of both 11th and 12th grades:

- Plastic arts
- Music

Students of 12th grade (General High Schools):

In light of the Réforme des lycées, which went into effect with the class of 2021, students now participate in the Concours associated with one or both of their two specialized subjects. Philosophy is open to all, but is no longer separated into two exams for scientific and economic students, and literary students.

- Philosophy
- Mathematics
- Physics and Chemistry
- Biology and Geology
- Engineering
- Economics

Language exams:

- Arabic
- Chinese (from 2007)
- English
- German
- Hebrew
- Italian
- Portuguese
- Spanish
- Russian

Students of technological and professional high schools usually attempt their main subject.

== Alumni ==
The Concours Général was created in 1744, so being a lauréat of the Concours général is a very prestigious award for any high school student. Many well-known French scientists, artists, literary figures and entrepreneurs have won the Concours Général in one or even several subjects. Such names include:

=== Arts & letters, social science ===
- Maurice Denis
- Charles Baudelaire
- Edmond de Goncourt
- Victor Hugo
- André Chénier
- André Suarès
- Paul Bourget
- Fernand Gregh
- Antoine Blondin
- Jules Lemaitre
- Roger Nimier
- Lucien-Anatole Prévost-Paradol
- Émile Faguet
- André Maurois
- Edmond About
- Alfred Jarry
- Jean Giraudoux
- Charles Augustin Sainte-Beuve
- Jules Romains
- Alfred de Musset
- Charles Péguy
- Émile Littré
- Charles Forbes René de Montalembert
- Serge Audier
- Émile Boutroux
- Valérie Mangin
- Émile Chartier (Alain)
- Henri Bergson
- Fustel de Coulanges
- Jérôme Carcopino
- Jules Michelet
- René Huyghe
- Hippolyte Taine

=== Science and math ===
- Urbain Le Verrier
- Augustin Louis Cauchy
- Marcelin Berthelot
- Antoine Lavoisier
- Henri Poincaré
- Laurent Schwartz
- Évariste Galois
- Louis Pasteur
- Jean-Pierre Serre
- Yves Meyer
- Emmanuel Farhi
- Sadi Carnot
- Louis Néel

=== Politicians and statesmen ===
- Léon Blum
- Georges Pompidou
- Édouard Herriot
- Maurice Couve de Murville
- Maurice Schumann
- Maximilien de Robespierre
- Anne Robert Jacques Turgot, Baron de Laune
- Camille Desmoulins
- Jean Jaurès
- Alexandre Millerand
- Paul Painlevé
- André Tardieu
- Charles Alexandre de Calonne
- Henri d'Orléans, duc d'Aumale
- Auguste Blanqui
- Edgar Faure

== See also ==
- International Science Olympiad
