= Veronica Guerrieri =

Italian and American economist

Veronica Guerrieri is an economist specializing in macroeconomics, including competitive equilibria, capital and liquidity, and housing markets. Educated in Italy and the US, she works in the US as the Ronald E. Tarrson Distinguished Service Professor of Economics and Willard Graham Faculty Scholar at the University of Chicago Booth School of Business.

== Education and career ==
Guerrieri studied economics at Bocconi University in Milan, receiving a bachelor's degree in 2000, and a master's degree in 2001. She continued her studies at the Massachusetts Institute of Technology, completing her Ph.D. in 2006.

She has been a faculty member at the University of Chicago Booth School of Business since 2006. In 2013 she became a research associate of the National Bureau of Economic Research.

== Recognition ==
Guerrieri was the 2013 recipient of the Carlo Alberto Medal of the Collegio Carlo Alberto, and the 2014 recipient of the Germán Bernácer Prize, given "for her influential research contributions regarding the application of search theory to explain the emergence of illiquidity and fire sales in different asset markets".

She became a Sloan Research Fellow in 2011, and a Fellow of the Econometric Society in 2021.
