= Stijn Van Nieuwerburgh =

Economist and academic

- Born: July 8, 1976 (age 50); Ghent, Belgium
- Awards: Germán Bernácer Prize (2015)

Academic background
- Education: University of Ghent, Stanford University

Academic work
- Discipline: Economics
- Sub-discipline: Real Estate
- Institutions: New York University Stern School of Business; Columbia Business School

Stijn Van Nieuwerburgh is Belgian-American academic and economist who is the Earle W. Kazis and Benjamin Schore Professor of Real Estate at Columbia Business School. For his research on the economic impact of working from home on real estate and public finance, he is called "the prophet of urban doom" by The New York Times.

== Early life and education ==
Van Nieuwerburgh was born and grew up in Ghent in Belgium and received his B.A. from the University of Gent and his M.A. and Ph.D. from Stanford University after relocation to the United States.

== Career ==
He joined the faculty of New York University in 2003 and was named David S. Loeb Professor of Finance in 2016 before joining the Columbia faculty in 2018. His research has focused on real estate and asset pricing.

He is the recipient of the 2015 Germán Bernácer Prize, "for his influential research on the transmission of shocks in the housing market on the macro-economy and the prices of financial assets." He was also an editor of The Review of Financial Studies.

== Urban doom loop ==
Van Nieuwerburgh gained media attention when he published two papers in 2022 on how remote work has created an "urban doom loop" in major American cities. He argued that remote work makes office space less valuable, causes companies to move away and lowers a city's revenue from real estate taxes, subsequently leading to a reduction in public service investment and provision. People working from home also leads to lower urban foot traffic and less retail spending, resulting in a relative increase in urban homelessness and crime, which makes people feel unsafe and leave the city, damaging the city's revenue stream and perpetuating the vicious cycle.

He also saw working from home as the new normal, and forecasted "broader implications for investors in equity and debt markets, productivity and innovation, local public finances, and the climate."

Van Nieuwerburgh argued that between 30 and 40 percent of New York's office space could be turned into "wonderful housing" to make the city more attractive and ease the damage from remote work.

The doom loop has been used to describe many cities, including St. Louis.
