= Stephanie Schmitt-Grohe =

German economist

Stephanie Schmitt-Grohé
- Spouse: Martín Uribe
- Awards: Bernácer Prize (2004)

Academic background
- Education: University of Chicago (PhD); Baruch College (MBA); University of Münster (Vordiplom)
- Doctoral advisor: Michael Dean Woodford

Academic work
- Discipline: Economics
- School or tradition: New Keynesian economics
- Institutions: Columbia University; Duke University; Rutgers University; Federal Reserve Board of Governors
- Main interests: Macroeconomics; Monetary Policy
- Website: https://ideas.repec.org/e/psc44.html

Stephanie Schmitt-Grohé is a German economist who has been a professor of economics at Columbia University since 2008. Her research focuses on macroeconomics, fiscal policy, and monetary policy in open and closed economies. In 2004, she was awarded the Bernácer Prize, for her research on monetary stabilization policies.

== Biography ==
Schmitt-Grohé received a vordiplom in economics from the University of Münster in 1987, an MBA from Baruch College in 1989, and a PhD in economics from the University of Chicago in 1994. At Chicago, her doctoral adviser was Michael Dean Woodford, who developed of one of the first microfounded New Keynesian macroeconomic models.

From 1994 to 1998, Schmitt-Grohé worked in the Division of Monetary Affairs of the Federal Reserve Board. She became an assistant professor at Rutgers University in 1998, where she became a tenured associate professor in 2001. She left Rutgers in 2003 for Duke University, where she was a professor of economics from 2003 to 2008. She became a professor of economics at Columbia University in 2008, where she has remained ever since.

Schmitt-Grohé has been a research fellow at the CEPR since 2003, where she was affiliated to the program on international macroeconomics from 1998 to 2003. She has been a research associate at the NBER since 2003, where she has been attached to the program on economic fluctuations and growth since 2003, and to the program on international finance and macroeconomics since 2013.

== Research ==
Schmitt-Grohé has stated that much of her early work was motivated by the emergence of the New Keynesian paradigm in macroeconomics at the time. The assumption of imperfect competition and its effects on nominal and real distortions in the New Keynesian economic framework had given way to new ideas and research of stabilization policies. Schmitt-Grohé's scholarship in the area has been multifaceted, and includes, developing tools intended to assist with the rigors of developing these new models, evaluating existing modeling of fiscal and monetary stabilization policies, and developing stabilization policies under various distortionary assumptions. On top of her contributions to macroeconomic modelling, Schmitt-Grohé has dedicated research to discussions on contemporary issues, including, inflation targeting in the post-recession Eurozone and the debate on targeting inflation below zero. As of April 2019 Schmitt-Grohé's research ranks among the top 5% of economists registered with RePEc.

=== Research on stabilization policy ===
A series of publications by Schmitt-Grohé, Jess Benhabib and Martín Uribe between 2001 and 2002 seek to address what they considered a gap in the current literature on stabilization policy. Citing that the current research on monetary policy regimes with interest rate feedback rules lacked in that they only considered local dynamics, meaning small fluctuations around the proposed equilibrium, and that they do not take into account the zero lower bound on nominal interest rates. These simplifications had thus far lead to a single, unique steady state equilibrium, near the targeted inflation rate. Schmitt-Grohé's research deviated mainly in its loosening of these local dynamics and its consideration of a zero lower bound on nominal interest rates. The results of their study confirmed the existence of multiple equilibria; one near the targeted inflation rate as was previously identified; as well as a second equilibrium with zero nominal interest rates and low inflation to mild deflation. This research has taken on importance in after the 2008 financial crisis discourse regarding the presence of a liquidity trap and the subsequent historically low interest rates.

=== Currency pegs ===
In a 2012 paper, Stephanie Schmitt-Grohé and Martín Uribe explore the various issues arising from the system of smaller economies using currency pegs, an exchange rate policy where the smaller country's relative exchange rate is fixed to that of a larger economy. The issues cited arise due to the presence of external shocks, such as a fall in the terms of trade or steep hikes in interest rate premiums which lead to a decrease in aggregate demand, this decrease in aggregate demand must in turn be combated by a decrease in real prices. They state that within contemporary monetary policy, central banks can combat this shock by lowering either the nominal exchange rate or nominal prices. However, the presence of a currency pegging regime rules out devaluations of the nominal exchange rate, therefore central banks must resort to a devaluation of nominal prices. Economies that face downward rigidity on prices however, will experience less effectiveness from monetary policy, with real devaluation taking place slowly. They conclude that economies following a currency pegging system will face between 1.3 and 7.1% higher unemployment, and between 0.4%-4.8% lower consumption than an economy that follows a free-floating exchange rate regime.

== Selected awards ==
- Honorary Professor, Henan University, Kaifeng, China, 2018-
- National Science Foundation Grant, with Martín Uribe, 2011-2013
- Bernacer Prize, 2004
- Alfred P. Sloan Doctoral Dissertation Fellowship, 1993
- University of Chicago Fellowships, 1989–92
- Fulbright Fellowship, 1987-1988

== Published works ==
=== Economics textbooks ===
- Uribe, Martín; Schmitt-Grohé, Stephanie (2017). Open Economy Macroeconomics. Princeton University Press. ISBN 978-1-4008-8530-5.

=== Selected academic articles ===
- Benhabib, Jess; Schmitt-Grohé, Stephanie; Uribe, Martín (2002). "Chaotic Interest-Rate Rules" (PDF). The American Economic Review. 92 (2): 72–78. doi:10.1257/000282802320189032. JSTOR 3083380. SSRN 280088.
- Schmitt-Grohé, Stephanie; Uribe, Martı́n (October 2003). "Closing small open economy models" (PDF). Journal of International Economics. 61 (1): 163–185. doi:10.1016/S0022-1996(02)00056-9.
- Schmitt-Grohé, Stephanie; Uribe, Martı́n (January 2004). "Solving dynamic general equilibrium models using a second-order approximation to the policy function" (PDF). Journal of Economic Dynamics and Control. 28 (4): 755–775. doi:10.1016/S0165-1889(03)00043-5.
- Schmitt-Grohé, Stephanie; Uribe, Martín (October 2004). Optimal Operational Monetary Policy in the Christiano-Eichenbaum-Evans Model of the US Business Cycle (Report). CEPR. CiteSeerX 10.1.1.200.653.
- Ravn, Morten O.; Schmitt-Grohe, Stephanie; Uribe, Martín (2008). Incomplete Cost Pass-Through Under Deep Habits (Report). European University Institute. hdl:1814/7863.
