= Monika Piazzesi =

American academic

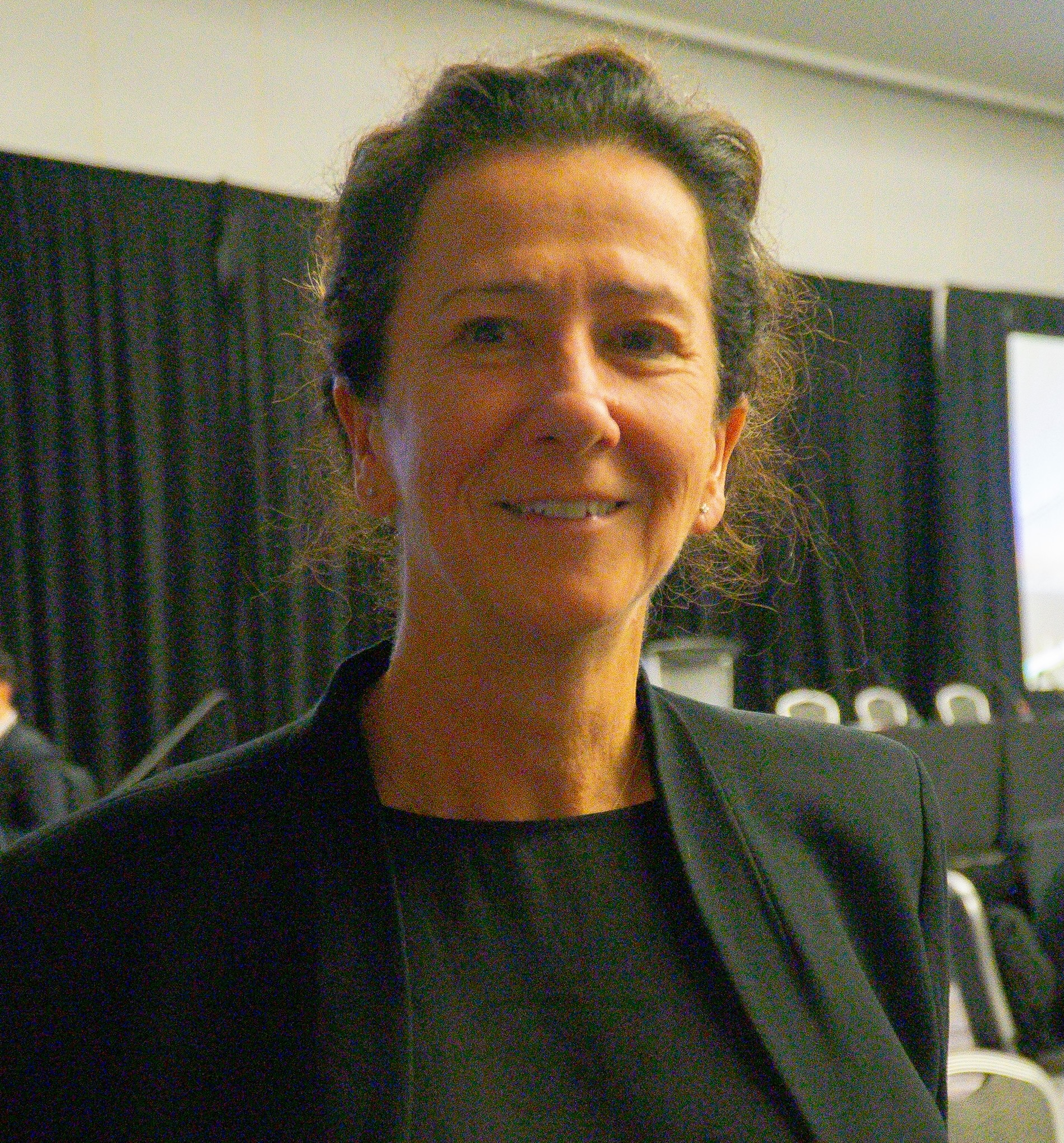
- Education: University of Bonn; Stanford University
- Awards: Germán Bernácer Prize, 2005; Elaine Bennett Research Prize, 2006
- Scientific career
- Workplaces: University of California, Los Angeles; University of Chicago; Stanford University
- Doctoral advisor: Darrell Duffie

Monika Piazzesi received her PhD in economics at Stanford University. She has been the Joan Kenney Professor of Economics at Stanford University since 2010. She is also a senior fellow at the Stanford Institute for Economic Policy Research. In 2005, when she was an assistant professor at the University of Chicago Business School, she received the Germán Bernácer Prize. She subsequently won the Elaine Bennett Research Prize. Her research focuses on asset pricing, macroeconomics, and time series econometrics, especially related to bond markets and the term structure of interest rates. She has published papers related to housing issues, asset prices and quantities, bond markets, banks' risk exposures, and monetary policy. She was President of the American Finance Association in 2024. She was director of the NBER Asset Pricing Program 2007–2019. In 2023, she was elected to the National Academy of Sciences.

== Biography ==
Piazzesi attended the University of Heidelberg in Germany, where she studied economics and received her Vordiplom in 1991. She received an undergraduate degree in economics from the University of Bonn in 1994 and her PhD in economics from Stanford University in 2000. She then took the position of assistant professor at the University of California at Los Angeles. She joined the University of Chicago Graduate School of Business faculty in 2003 as assistant professor and was promoted to associate professor in 2005 and became professor of finance in 2006. She served as the John Huizinga Faculty Fellow there from 2006 to 2008. She joined the Stanford faculty in 2008 as professor of economics, becoming the Joan Kenney Professor of Economics in 2010.

She has received numerous awards, including the Faculty Teaching Prize, Department of Economics, Stanford University (2011); Fellow, American Academy of Arts and Sciences (2011); Fellow, Econometric Society (2008); and the Elaine Bennett Research Prize, the American Economic Association (2006).

In addition to published research papers, she has authored other publications such as “Remapping the Flow of Funds”, “Estimating Rational Expectations Models” and “Affine Term Structure Models”. She is also working on papers related to Taylor Rules, monetary policy and yield curve.

Her academic area is finance and she has research interests in the fields of financial economics, macroeconomics and applied time series analysis.

== Academic work ==
Piazzesi worked in the asset pricing field and co-authored the article "Perspectives on the Future of Asset Pricing". This article summarizes the views shared by experts in the NBER Asset pricing program that convened at Stanford University.

She received the Bernácer Prize for having "developed a unified approach that improves our understanding of the connection between asset prices including bonds, equities and real estate and the institutional features of monetary policy and business cycles."

She was co-editor of the Journal of Political Economy from 2006 to 2014. From 2006 to 2008 she was associate editor of the American Economic Review, and from 2005 to 2008, of the Economic Journal. From 2008 to 2011, she was an affiliated professor of the Ludwig-Maximilians-Universität München.

She has taught the degree course "Finance 637: Macroeconomics and Financial Markets" since 2018. This course covers research themes at the intersection of macroeconomics and finance.

=== Selected works ===
- Ang, Andrew; Piazzesi, Monika (2003). "A no-arbitrage vector autoregression of term structure dynamics with macroeconomic and latent variables" (PDF). Journal of Monetary Economics. 50 (4): 745–787. doi:10.1016/S0304-3932(03)00032-1. S2CID 7229610.
- Cochrane, John H.; Piazzesi, Monika (2005). "Bond Risk Premia" (PDF). American Economic Review. 95: 138–160. doi:10.1257/0002828053828581. S2CID 16757437.
- Ang, Andrew; Piazzesi, Monika; Wei, Min (2006). "What does the yield curve tell us about GDP growth?" (PDF). Journal of Econometrics. 131 (1–2): 359–403. doi:10.1016/j.jeconom.2005.01.032. S2CID 3159052.
- Piazzesi, Monika; Schneider, Martin; Tuzel, Selale (2007). "Housing, consumption and asset pricing" (PDF). Journal of Financial Economics. 83 (3): 531–569. doi:10.1016/j.jfineco.2006.01.006. S2CID 5139186.
- Piazzesi, Monika (2010). "Affine Term Structure Models". Handbook of Financial Econometrics: Tools and Techniques. pp. 691–766. doi:10.1016/B978-0-444-50897-3.50015-8. ISBN 9780444508973.
- Piazzesi, Monika; Longstaff, Francis (2004). "Corporate earnings and the equity premium" (PDF). Journal of Financial Economics. 74 (3): 401–421. doi:10.1016/j.jfineco.2003.12.001.
