= Viñales (disambiguation) =

Viñales is a town in Pinar del Río, Cuba. It may also refer to:

== People ==
- Isaac Viñales (born 1993), Spanish motorcycle racer
- Maverick Viñales (born 1995), Spanish motorcycle racer
- Dean Berta Viñales (2006–2021) Spanish motorcycle racer
- Pablo Pavón Vinales (born 1945), Mexican trade union leader
- Kyle Vinales, American basketball player

== Places ==
- Viñales Valley, Cuba
- Viñales, a village in Bembibre, Spain

== See also ==
- Viñals
- Vinalesa, Spain
