= Franziska Michor =

Austrian biomathematician (born 1982)

- Born: 1982 (age 43–44); Vienna, Austria
- Education: Harvard University; University of Vienna; University of Trieste; Institute for Advanced Study
- Spouse: Roland Fryer
- Father: Peter W. Michor
- Scientific career
- Workplaces: Harvard University; Memorial Sloan Kettering Cancer Center; Cornell University; Dana–Farber Cancer Institute
- Thesis: Evolutionary dynamics of cancer (2005)
- Doctoral advisor: Martin Nowak
- Website: Michor Lab

Franziska Michor (born 1982) is an Austrian computational biologist. She is a professor in the department of data science at the Dana–Farber Cancer Institute. She serves as Director of the Physical Sciences-Oncology Center and the Center for Cancer Evolution.

== Education and early career ==
Michor was born in Vienna in 1982. Her father, Peter W. Michor, is a mathematician and a retired professor at the University of Vienna, and her mother was a nurse. As a child she became interested in mathematics, and was inspired to follow a scientific career that helped others. Michor was an undergraduate student in mathematics and molecular biology at the University of Vienna. She spent a year at the University of Trieste, where she studied medical biotechnology. She moved to the Institute for Advanced Study as a graduate student, where she worked in theoretical biology. Michor was a doctoral researcher in Harvard University, where she was based in the Department of Organismic and Evolutionary Biology. Her thesis considered the evolutionary dynamics of cancer. She identified the time required for the genes within cancer cells to mutate and become protective against cancer.

== Research and career ==
Michor completed her doctoral research in less than three years, after which she was made a Junior Fellow in the Harvard Society of Fellows. Her early work considered the development of a mathematical model to study the evolution of cells that lead to the end stage of chronic myelogenous leukemia. Specifically, Michor sought to understand why certain patients failed to improve after treatment with Gleevec. Michor was the first researcher to be honoured with the Austrian Scientists and Scholars in North America (ASciNA) award.

In 2007, Michor was appointed to the faculty at the Memorial Sloan Kettering Cancer Center, and as assistant professor at the Weill Cornell Graduate School of Medical Sciences. Her laboratory consider the evolutionary dynamics of cancer, including its initiation, progression, response to therapy, and emergence of resistance. She moved to the Dana–Farber Cancer Institute in 2010, where she was promoted to Professor in 2015.

Michor is on the steering committee of the American Association for Cancer Research Cancer Evolution Working Group.

== Personal life ==
Michor is married to Roland G. Fryer Jr., a professor of economics who, at age 30, became the youngest African-American to be given tenure at Harvard University.

== Awards and honors ==
- 2004 Fred Hutchinson Cancer Research Center Harold M. Weintraub Graduate Student Award
- 2005 Elected Junior Fellow of the Harvard Society of Fellows
- 2007 Theodosius Dobzhansky Prize of the Society for the Study of Evolution
- 2008 Austrian Scientists and Scholars in North America (ASciNA) Award
- 2009 Leon Levy Foundation Young Investigator Award
- 2010 Gerstner Young Investigator Award
- 2012 Alice Hamilton Award
- 2012 Speaker at TEDMED
- 2015 Vilcek Prize for Creative Promise in Biomedical Science
- 2015 Carnegie Corporation of New York Great Immigrants Award
- 2015 NYSCF - Robertson Stem Cell Prize
- 2016 The 36th Annual AACR Award for Outstanding Achievement in Cancer Research

== Selected publications ==
- Franziska Michor; Timothy P Hughes; Yoh Iwasa; Susan Branford; Neil P Shah; Charles L Sawyers; Martin A Nowak (1 June 2005). "Dynamics of chronic myeloid leukaemia". Nature. 435 (7046): 1267–1270. doi:10.1038/nature03669. ISSN 1476-4687. PMID 15988530. Wikidata Q40403398.
- Philipp M. Altrock; Lin L. Liu; Franziska Michor (1 November 2015). "The mathematics of cancer: integrating quantitative models" (PDF). Nature Reviews Cancer. 15 (12): 730–745. doi:10.1038/nrc4029. ISSN 1474-175X. PMID 26597528. Wikidata Q38644551.
- Andriy Marusyk; Doris P. Tabassum; Philipp M. Altrock; Vanessa Almendro; Franziska Michor; Kornelia Polyak (30 July 2014). "Non-cell-autonomous driving of tumour growth supports sub-clonal heterogeneity". Nature. 514 (7520): 54–58. doi:10.1038/nature13556. ISSN 1476-4687. PMC 4184961. PMID 25079331. Wikidata Q34287934.
