= S. Rao Aiyagari =

American economist

Sudhakar Rao Aiyagari (November 9, 1951 – May 20, 1997) was an Indian-born economics professor at the University of Rochester. He had previous been a leading research economist at the Minneapolis Fed, prior to which he had taught, in the 1980s, at New York University, University of Wisconsin, Madison, and Carnegie-Mellon University in Pittsburgh.

Aiyagari made significant contributions to the economics literature, primarily in the areas of macroeconomics, monetary theory and intertemporal general equilibrium theory. He died of a heart attack while playing tennis aged 45. Aiyagari held a doctorate in economics (received 1981) from the University of Minnesota and master's degrees in economics and physics from Jawaharlal Nehru University in New Delhi and the Indian Institute of Technology, Delhi, India.

== Select publications ==
- Aiyagari, S Rao (December 1995). "Optimal Capital Income Taxation with Incomplete Markets, Borrowing Constraints, and Constant Discounting" (PDF). Journal of Political Economy. 103 (6). University of Chicago Press: 1158–75. doi:10.1086/601445. S2CID 155057759.
- Aiyagari, S Rao (August 1994). "Uninsured Idiosyncratic Risk and Aggregate Saving" (PDF). The Quarterly Journal of Economics. 109 (3). Oxford University Press: 659–684. doi:10.2307/2118417. JSTOR 2118417.
