= Jun Pan =

Jun Pan is the SAIF Chair Professor of Finance at the Shanghai Advanced Institute of Finance (SAIF) at Shanghai Jiao Tong University. She is an editor at the Review of Finance and an associate editor at the Journal of Finance.

== Career ==
She obtained her BSc in physics at Shanghai Jiao Tong University followed by a MSc in Physics at Western Illinois University. After that, she went on to obtain two PhDs: on in Physics at New York University and another in Finance at the Graduate School of Business at Stanford University.

After her graduate studies she went to MIT Sloan being promoted from Assistant professor in 2000 to full professor 2010. She was then awarded a distinguished professor. She moved to Shanghai Jiao Tong University in 2020.

== Research ==
Her research is on finance and asset pricing. Her most cited paper has been published in Econometrica and is titled "Transform Analysis and Asset Pricing for Affine Jump-Diffusions". The paper is econometric in nature and offers practical applications fixed-income pricing models. She also has published papers in the Journal of Financial Economics, the Journal of Finance and the Review of Financial Studies.

Her research has been cited 15187 times and she is the 140th most cited female economist according to RePEC. She won the Stephen A. Ross Prize in Financial Economics.
