= Social VAT =

Earmarking of VAT revenues for social security

Social VAT is the earmarking of a defined amount of VAT revenues to finance social security. The shift from taxing labour to taxing consumption in order to finance social security is based on several premises.

- reduce non-wage costs in order to improve competitiveness
- achieve sustainable revenues for the social security system
- share the tax burden of social security systems more equitably

The impact of a shift from payroll financing to VAT financing is similar to devaluation as labour costs fall and improve competitiveness.

== History ==
Several countries have switched social security funding from payroll taxation or social security contributions on salaries and wages towards consumption taxation funding.

== Examples ==
=== Denmark ===
In 1987 Denmark introduced a wide-ranging tax reform with the aim of guaranteeing the viability of the social security system while permitting Danish companies to remain competitive. Initially employer payroll tax for unemployment and disability insurance was phased out and replaced by a VAT-like tax on consumption. The tax was later merged into the general VAT by increasing the VAT rate from 21% to 25%. Currently employer contributions are limited to contributions to the state pension fund ATP which also covers other contingencies such as maternity leave, salary guarantee and disability.

=== Germany ===
In 2007 Angela Merkel's government decided upon a 3%-point increase in the standard VAT rate (from 16% to 19%) and a simultaneous reduction of 1.8%-points in employer social security contributions by reducing the unemployment contingency by 2.3%-points and increasing the pension contribution by 0.5%-points. By reducing non-wage labour costs the measure had a positive impact on German competitiveness.

=== Hungary ===
In 2009 Hungary decided a simultaneous 5% reduction in employer social security contributions and a 5% increase in VAT.

=== France ===
In his new year allocution French President Sarkozy announced that France would start to shift social security funding from labour to consumption. Although not general in France, some overseas territories of France already introduced a shift from employer contributions to VAT under a 1994 law (loi Perben) to promote economic development in Martinique, Guadeloupe and Réunion. Employer social security was reduced and VAT was increased from 7.5% to 9.5%.

In a television address to the nation on 29 January 2012 Nicolas Sarkozy announced amongst other measures an increase in VAT of 1.6 percentage points from 19.6% to 20% coupled with a partial removal of social security contributions financing child benefits and other family benefits. The French government estimates that the cut in non-wage costs of 10.4 billion euros per year will improve the competitive position of French firms and close part of the gap with its main competitors on international markets.
