= José Manuel Campa =

Spanish economist (born 1964)

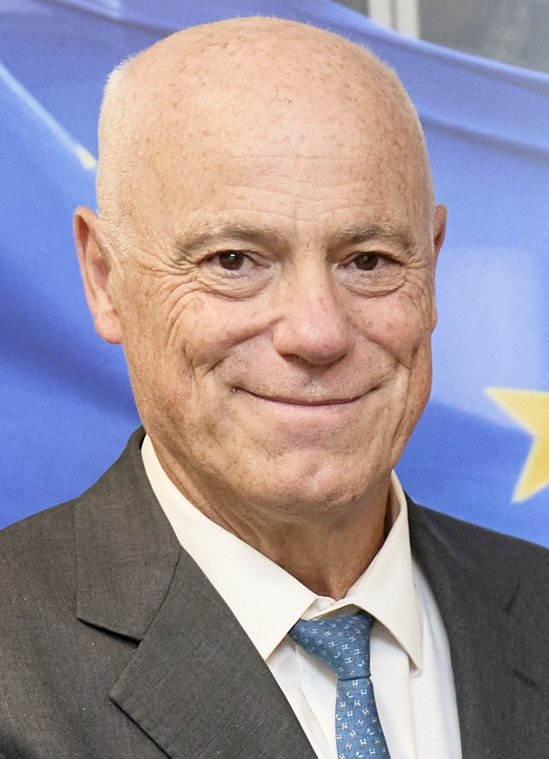
- José Manuel Campa in 2025

Chairperson of the European Banking Authority
- In office 1 May 2019 – 31 January 2026
- Preceded by: Andrea Enria
- Succeeded by: François-Louis Michaud

Secretary of State for Economy
- In office 14 May 2009 – 23 December 2011
- Preceded by: David Vegara Figueras
- Succeeded by: Fernando Jiménez Latorre

Personal details
- Born: José Manuel Campa Fernández; 20 July 1964 (age 62) Oviedo, Spain
- Education: University of Oviedo; Harvard University

José Manuel Campa Fernández (born 20 July 1964) is a Spanish economist, professor and former government official who served as chairperson of the European Banking Authority from May 2019 until 31 January 2026. Prior to this, he has been a senior member of Santander Bank and has previously served as Secretary of State for Economy in the Government of Spain.

== Biography ==
Campa has a degree in law and economics from the University of Oviedo and a PhD in economics from Harvard University.

Between 14 May 2009 and 23 December 2011 he served as the Secretary of State for Economy of the Spanish government under the premiership of José Luis Rodríguez Zapatero.

Before being Secretary of State he was finance professor in the IESE Business School of the University of Navarre.

He has been a consultant of the World Bank, of the International Monetary Found, the Inter-American Development Bank, of the Federal Reserve Bank of New York, of the Bank for International Settlements, of the European Commission and of the Bank of Spain.

In 2014, he was appointed Director of Investor Relations and Analysts of the Santander Bank. He continues being finance professor of the IESE Business School as an External Collaborating Professor.

On 19 February 2019 he was nominated to be the next Chairperson of the European Banking Authority, replacing Andrea Enria. The European Parliament approved the nomination on 14 March 2019. He assumed the office on 1 May 2019.

In February 2024, the European Council renewed Campa's mandate as Chairperson of the EBA for a second five-year term, until May 2029. In September 2025, Campa announced his resignation from his position as Chairperson of the EBA, effective on 31 January 2026. François-Louis Michaud succeeded Campa as chairperson on 16 April 2026 after the Council of the European Union formally appointed him.

In March 2026, he rejoined IESE Business School as a professor in the departments of Financial Management and Economics, at the Madrid campus.
