= Darrell Duffie =

American economist

J. Darrell Duffie
- Born: May 23, 1954 (age 72)
- Education: Stanford University
- Scientific career
- Fields: Mathematical finance
- Workplaces: Stanford Graduate School of Business
- Doctoral advisor: David Luenberger
- Doctoral students: Monika Piazzesi; Yilin (David) Yang

James Darrell Duffie (born May 23, 1954) is a Canadian financial economist and is Dean Witter Distinguished Professor of Finance at Stanford Graduate School of Business.

He is the author of numerous research articles, and several books, including Futures Markets, Dynamic Asset Pricing Theory, and—with Kenneth Singleton—Credit Risk.

== Education ==
He holds a Ph.D. (1984) in Engineering Economic Systems from Stanford University, a Master of Economics (1980) from the University of New England (Australia), and a Bachelor of Science in Engineering (Civil Engineering) (1975) from the University of New Brunswick.

== Career ==
Duffie has been on the finance faculty at Stanford since 1984. He is a Fellow and member of the Council of the Econometric Society, a Research Associate of the National Bureau of Economic Research, a member of the Financial Advisory Roundtable of the Federal Reserve Bank of New York, and a Fellow of The American Academy of Arts and Sciences. He was the President of The American Finance Association for 2009. He has served on the editorial board of many journals, including Econometrica. In 2003, Duffie was awarded the SunGard/IAFE Financial Engineer of the Year Award from the International Association of Financial Engineers.

In 2014, Duffie chaired the Market Participants Group, charged by the Financial Stability Board with recommending reforms to Libor, Euribor, and other interest rate benchmarks. He is a co-author of the proposal for Across-the-Curve Credit Spread Index ("AXI") and its extension Financial Conditions Credit Spread Index ("FXI") but has no related compensation and has no affiliation with their operationalization. AXI and FXI are forward looking benchmark credit spreads that can be used in conjunction with the Secured Overnight Financing Rate (“SOFR”) to form a credit sensitive interest rate benchmark. The spreads were launched in 2022 and are published and administered by Invesco Indexing LLC, an independent index provider owned by global asset manager Invesco Ltd.
