= Journal of International Economics =

- Discipline: Economics
- Language: English
- Edited by: Costas Arkolakis and Martin Uribe

Publication details
- History: 1971–present
- Publisher: Elsevier (Netherlands)
- Frequency: Bimonthly
- Impact factor: 3.373 (2020)

Standard abbreviations
- ISO 4: J. Int. Econ.

Indexing
- CODEN: JIECBE
- ISSN: 0022-1996
- LCCN: 75024860
- OCLC no.: 1797961

Links
- Journal homepage; Online access

The Journal of International Economics is a peer-reviewed academic journal in the field of economics. The journal publishes articles on both theoretical and empirical aspects of international economics. Various topics covered include trade patterns, commercial policy, international institutions, exchange rates, open economy macroeconomics, international finance, and international factor mobility.

Beginning in February 2000 the journal initiated the Bhagwati Award, named in honor of Jagdish Bhagwati. The award is given biannually to the best article appearing in the journal in the preceding two years. The monetary value of the award is $1,000.

According to the Journal Citation Reports, the journal has a 2020 impact factor of 3.373.
