= José Viñals =

Spanish economist and businessman (born 1954)

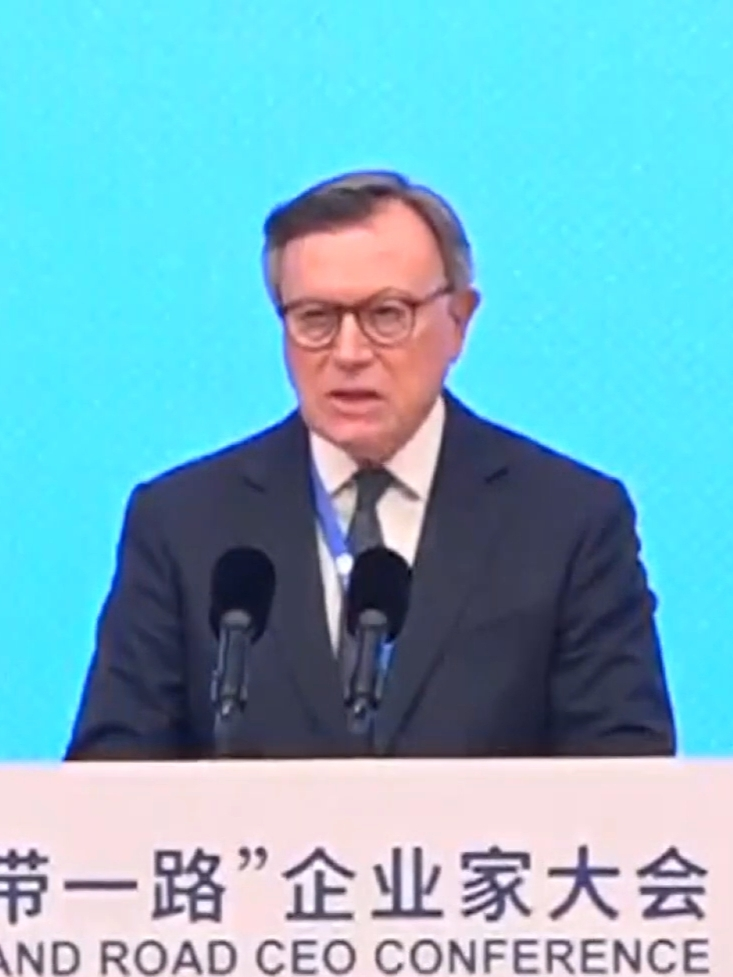
- José Viñals in 2023
- Born: José Maria Viñals Íñiguez; 20 June 1954 (age 72); Madrid
- Education: University of Valencia; London School of Economics; Harvard University
- Occupations: Group Chairman, Standard Chartered; Chairman, Standard Chartered Bank
- Spouse: married
- Children: 4

José Maria Viñals Íñiguez (born 20 June 1954) is a Spanish economist and businessman. He serves as Group Chairman of Standard Chartered and Chairman of Standard Chartered Bank, the United Kingdom subsidiary of Standard Chartered.

== Early life ==
José Viñals was born 20 June 1954 in Madrid, Spain. He graduated from the University of Valencia with a bachelor's degree in economics in 1976, and went on to earn a master's degree in economics from the London School of Economics in 1977 and a PhD from Harvard University in 1981.

== Career ==
Viñals began his career as an assistant professor of economics at Stanford University from 1981 to 1986.

Viñals worked as an economist for the Bank of Spain from 1986 to 2006, when he retired as deputy governor.

Viñals worked for the International Monetary Fund from 2009 to 2016, when he retired as the financial counsellor and director of the monetary and capital markets department. He was "also the IMF’s chief spokesman on financial matters, including global financial stability."

Viñals succeeded John Peace as group chairman of Standard Chartered on December 1, 2016.

== Other activities ==
- Institute of International Finance (IFF), Member of the Board

== Personal life ==
Viñals is married and has four children.
