= Michel Aglietta =

French economist (1938–2025)

- Born: Michel Joseph Aglietta; 18 February 1938; Chambéry, France
- Died: 24 April 2025 (aged 87); Paris, France
- Occupations: Economist, academic

Academic background
- Education: École polytechnique ENSAE ParisTech; Paris 1 Panthéon-Sorbonne University (PhD); Harvard Business School
- Thesis: Régulation du mode de production capitaliste dans la longue période. Prenant exemple des États-Unis (1870-1970) (1974)
- Doctoral advisor: Raymond Barre; Jean-Louis Guglielmi
- Other advisors: Jean Weiller; Kenneth Arrow; Paul Sweezy
- Influences: Marx; Perroux; Keynes; Kalecki; Minsky; Polanyi; Schumpeter; Braudel; Simmel; Girard

Academic work
- Discipline: Regulatory economics Monetary economics
- School or tradition: Regulation school Institutional economics
- Institutions: INSEE (1964–1976); University of Picardy (1976–1982); Paris Nanterre University (1982–); CEPII (1979–); OFCE; Groupama; Bank of France; Conseil d'Analyse Économique (1997–2003); Haut Conseil des finances publiques (2013–)
- Notable ideas: Institutionalist theory of money
- Awards: 2016 Legion of Honour

Michel Aglietta (18 February 1938 – 24 April 2025) was a French economist, academic and monetary theorist. He worked as an administrateur at the Institut national de la statistique et des études économiques (INSEE) and as a professor of economics at Paris Nanterre University.

== Life and career ==
Aglietta was born in Chambéry in Savoy as the only son of bricklayer-turned-construction businessman Paul Aglietta and Emma Bardotti, an Italian immigrant couple of modest origins. He was raised Catholic. He attended preparatory scientific classes for two years at the Lycée du Parc in Lyon before commencing his studies at the École polytechnique in 1959. He completed his military service as an officer cadet in Kabylia during the Algerian War in 1961–1962, where he befriended the fellow student Philippe Herzog, who introduced him to the works of Karl Marx and François Perroux. He returned to study economics at the École nationale de la statistique et de l'administration économique (ENSAE) between 1962 and 1964 under Edmond Malinvaud, Maurice Allais and Raymond Barre. He joined the Institut national de la statistique et des études économiques (INSEE) as an administrateur in 1964 and worked on modelling income distribution for the Programming Division as part of the five-year forecasts delivered to the Haut-Commissariat à la Stratégie et au Plan. After the planning work was completed in 1968 but rendered obsolete by the economic consequences of the student revolt and abandoned by the new minister of finance Valéry Giscard d'Estaing in 1969, Aglietta left France to study economics with Kenneth Arrow, Paul Sweezy and John Thomas Dunlop at Harvard Business School on Malinvaud's recommendation as a NATO-funded research fellow from September 1970 to June 1972.

In 1973, he received his diplôme d'études supérieures from the Paris 1 Panthéon-Sorbonne University with a thesis on Recherche d’un concept structurel de compétitivité et application à l’évolution du commerce international dans la période récente, written under the supervision of Jean Weiller. In October 1974, he defended his doctoral thesis on long-term management of the conflict between labour and capital in American capitalism at the same university, before a jury composed of Raymond Barre (his supervisor), Hubert Brochier, Carlo Benetti, Alain Cotta and Edmond Malinvaud. In 1975, he submitted his second (supplementary) doctoral thesis on Les vicissitudes de la politique monétaire des États-Unis au cours des cinq dernières années, prepared under the guidance of Jean-Louis Guglielmi. He married Catherine Blum, a fellow INSEE employee, in 1974.

After completing his agrégation in 1976, he worked as a professor at the University of Picardy in Amiens until 1982. The 1976 monograph based on his dissertation, A Theory of Capitalist Regulation: The US Experience, together with an INSEE seminar that preceded the book's publication, laid the ground for the regulation school of economics, with Robert Boyer as its other leading figure. He became a specialist in international monetary economy, known for his work on the functions of financial markets. With André Orléan, whom he met at INSEE in 1975, he proposed an institutionalist credit theory of money premised on monetary sovereignty, drawing on the work of the Marxist monetary theorist Suzanne de Brunhoff and anthropologist René Girard. This money-centred view of the economy first appeared in the 1982 book La violence de la monnaie. In 1982, Aglietta joined Paris Nanterre University where he remained for the rest of his academic career, while teaching also at Sciences Po and HEC Paris. He supervised nearly 50 dissertations.

Aglietta became a scientific counsellor at the Centre d'Etudes Prospectives et d'Informations Internationales (CEPII) in 1979 and at the Observatoire français des conjonctures économiques (OFCE) during the 1980s, a member of the Institut Universitaire de France and a consultant for the asset management arm of the French insurance conglomerate Groupama. During the 1990s, he worked as an economist for the Bank of France. He also ran his late father's family company in Chambéry from 1974 into the late 1990s. From 1998 to 2006, he was a member of the Cercle des économistes. From 1997 to 2003, he was a member of the Conseil d'Analyse Économique (CAE) for the French Prime Minister Lionel Jospin of the Socialist Party. In 2013, he was appointed to the Haut Conseil des finances publiques.

Aglietta declared his support for François Hollande in the 2012 French presidential election, alongside other economists including Philippe Aghion and Thomas Piketty. He advised the former French minister of economy Arnaud Montebourg during his unsuccessful bid in the 2017 French Socialist Party presidential primary, alongside Jean-Paul Fitoussi. He warned in 2017 against the economic consequences of Marine Le Pen's project of returning to the French franc. In 2019, he expressed admiration for China's apparent capacity for long-term management of capitalism. In his last book of 2024, written with Étienne Espagne, he offered a viability theory framework for an eco-regulationist approach to economy that transcends the logic of capital accumulation in order to address the climate crisis.

He was awarded the Legion of Honour in 2016.

He died in Paris on 24 April 2025, at the age of 87.

== Main works ==
- Le modèle physico-financier de projection à moyen terme (FIFI) (co-author of vol. 1), 2 vols., Paris: Institut national de la statistique et des études économiques, 1973
- Régulation et crises du capitalisme. L'expérience des États-Unis, Paris: Calmann-Lévy, 1976 (2nd edn., without subtitle: Odile Jacob, 1997)
  - English translation by David Fernbach: A Theory of Capitalist Regulation: The US Experience, London: New Left Books, 1979 (reissued with a new postface in 2015)
- La violence de la monnaie (with André Orléan), Paris: Presses universitaires de France, 1982 (2nd edn. 1984)
- Les métamorphoses de la société salariale. La France en projet (with Anton Brender), Paris: Calmann-Lévy, 1984
- La fin des devises-clés. Essai sur la monnaie internationale, Paris: La Découverte, 1986
- L'Ecu et la vieille dame. Un levier pour l'Europe (ed.), Paris: Économica, 1986
- Souveraineté, légitimité de la monnaie. Séminaire organisé par le CREA, Centre de recherche en épistémologie appliquée, de l'École polytechnique (ed., with André Orléan), Paris: AEF, 1995
- Macroéconomie financière, Paris: La Découverte, 1995 (6th edn., with Natacha Valla, 2017)
- Macro-économie internationale, Paris: Montchrestien, 1997
- La monnaie souveraine (ed., with André Orléan), Paris: Odile Jacob, 1998
- Risques bancaires et transferts de risques, Paris: Groupama Asset Management, 2003
- Dérives du capitalisme financier (with Antoine Rebérioux), Paris: Albin Michel, 2004
  - English translation: Corporate Governance Adrift: A Critique of Shareholder Value, Cheltenham: Elgar, 2005
- Le risque déflationniste a-t-il été trop rapidement écarté ? (with Laurent Berrebi), Paris, Groupama Asset Management, 2004
- La Chine vers la superpuissance (with Yves Landry), Paris: Économica, 2007
- Désordres dans le capitalisme mondial (with Laurent Berrebi), Paris: Odile Jacob, 2007
- Crise et rénovation de la finance (with Sandra Rigot), Paris: Odile Jacob, 2009
- La crise. Pourquoi en est-on arrivé là ? Comment en sortir ?, Paris: Michalon, 2008 (2nd edn. as La crise. Les voies de sortie, 2010)
- Les hedge funds. Entrepreneurs ou requins de la finance? (with Sabrina Khanniche and Sandra Rigot), Paris: Perrin, 2010
- Zone euro. Éclatement ou fédération (interviews by Richard Robert), Paris: Michalon, 2011
- China's Development: Capitalism and Empire (with Guo Bai), London: Routledge, 2013
- Un New Deal pour l'Europe (with Thomas Brand), Paris: Odile Jacob, 2013
- Le dollar et le système monétaire international (with Virginie Coudert), Paris: La Découverte, 2014
- Europe. Sortir de la crise et inventer l'avenir, Paris: Michalon, 2014
  - English translation by Gregory Elliott: The Reform of Europe: A Political Guide to the Future, London: Verso Books, 2019
- La monnaie. Entre dettes et souveraineté, Paris: Odile Jacob, 2016
  - English translation by David Broder: Money: 5,000 Years of Debt and Power, London: Verso, 2018
- L'avenir de la zone euro (with Jacques Sapir), Paris: Institut Diderot, 2016
- La double démocratie. Une Europe politique pour la croissance (with Nicolas Leron), Paris: Éditions du Seuil, 2017
- L'argent et la psychanalyse. Économie, dette et désir (co-author), Paris: Campagne première, 2017
- Capitalisme. Le temps des ruptures (ed.), Paris: Odile Jacob, 2019
- Le futur de la monnaie (with Natacha Valla), Paris: Odile Jacob, 2021
- La course à la suprématie monétaire mondiale. À l'épreuve de la rivalité sino-américaine (with Guo Bai and Camille Macaire), Paris: Odile Jacob, 2022
- Pour une écologie politique. Au-delà du Capitalocène (with Étienne Espagne), Paris: Odile Jacob, 2024

== Sources ==
- Durand, Cédric (2025), "Michel Aglietta (1938–2025)" (PDF), New Left Review, 156: 85–99
