= Economic planning in France =

Economic planning in France, overseen by the General Planning Commission (French: Commissariat Général du Plan), was initiated in 1946 under the leadership of Jean Monnet. It continued for nearly half a century, evolving through various approaches.

== Origins and initial objectives ==
The concept of economic planning in France did not emerge immediately after World War II. It was shaped by diverse political movements during the interwar period and contributed to the 1933 split between the SFIO and the PSdF, influenced by the planisme of Henri de Man, leader of the Belgian Labour Party. A minority within the SFIO, the Révolution constructive group, remained supportive of planisme.

In 1934, a proposed plan brought together politicians and trade unionists from varied political backgrounds, both left and right. Some historians note that the 1930s saw a proliferation of planning proposals, though none were implemented at the state level.

Jacques Sapir traces French planning back to World War I, when ammunition shortages and mass conscription necessitated organized economic management.

== The Vichy regime's "Ten-Year Plan" ==
The Vichy regime introduced the first state-led economic planning instruments in France, concurrent with similar discussions by the National Council of the Resistance's Comité Général d'Étude from 1942–1943 and the French Committee of National Liberation in Algiers in 1944. The Vichy regime established the Délégation Générale à l'Équipement National (DGEN). It adopted the principle of a plan (law of April 6, 1941). In May 1942, the DGEN presented a 600-page, ten-year plan for reconstruction, industrial and technological catch-up, and controlled urbanization. The plan avoided nationalization, with the state's role limited to stimulating, guiding, and financing private investment.

Achievements under the Vichy plan were modest. Notable projects included land development in Sologne and La Crau, early work on the Tancarville Bridge, the Tunnel de la Croix-Rousse in Lyon, and several hydroelectric dam projects.

Only the plan's two-year "initial phase" was launched, later adopted by the De Gaulle government in 1944. The DGEN, with much of its staff retained, served as the foundation for the future General Planning Commission.

== Planning after 1945 ==
Post-1945 French planning, managed by the Commissariat au Plan, was indicative and incentivizing, unlike Soviet planning. The General Planning Commission (CGP) relied on two forecasting bodies: Insee and the SEEF (Service des Études Économiques et Financières of the Ministry of Finance).

French planning was distinctive in several ways. It represented the state's most unique effort to steer the market. By setting quantitative or qualitative goals agreed upon by social partners, the plan guided investments toward priority sectors for growth. In this sense, it acted as a "reducer of uncertainties," as described by Pierre Massé.

== Overview of the plans ==
The positions regarding the First Plan of Modernization and Equipment and the means to ensure its execution include the following:

Purpose and structure of the Plan

The 1947–1950 Plan of Modernization and Equipment, submitted to the Council, aimed primarily to:

- Rapidly improve the population's standard of living, particularly in food supply;
- Modernize and equip key industries (coal, electricity, steel, cement, agricultural machinery, and transport);
- Modernize agriculture;
- Allocate maximum resources to reconstruction, balancing the needs of key industries and modernizing the construction materials and building industries;
- Modernize and expand export industries to balance the trade accounts by 1950.

This created the foundation for a second phase focused on transforming living conditions, especially housing.

=== First Plan or Monnet Plan (1946–1952) ===
The First Plan of Modernization and Equipment is remembered as the one that, in the aftermath of World War II, quantified and translated into action the dilemma of "modernization or decline."

Its goals addressed economic lag and shortages, restarting production and meeting the population's essential needs, raising the standard of living, and improving housing and collective living conditions. The Plan extended to restoring public and private infrastructure and equipment damaged or destroyed by the war.

It focused selectively on six core sectors: coal, electricity, cement, agricultural machinery, transport, and steel. With a limited number of objectives and broad consensus, the First Plan was executed.

The plan fostered a new mindset among business leaders without undermining private initiative. The state's strengthened role in production, bolstered by post-war nationalizations and price controls, supported effective economic management.

The Marshall Plan significantly aided the Monnet Plan by financing much of the investment in core sectors.

The plan's initial duration was extended to 1952 to align with other schedules.

=== Second Plan (1954–1957) or Hirsch Plan ===
The Second Plan coincided with the final years of the Fourth Republic. It retained quantitative production targets, covering more sectors. Planning expanded to public investments, particularly in schools and hospitals. Multi-year programs were initiated, not at the request of relevant ministers but by the Budget Director, who sought to prioritize amid growing funding demands.

From the Second Plan, planning shifted from core sectors to actions enhancing resource efficiency—research and development, agricultural market organization, business restructuring, and workforce retraining.

Approved by law two years later, the Second Plan was reasonably well-executed despite severe financial difficulties caused by the Algerian War. Its completion saw a growing trade deficit, forcing the French government in January 1958 to send Jean Monnet to Washington for $600 million in emergency aid.

=== Third Plan (1958–1961) ===
The Third Plan aimed to sustain growth amid three key changes:

- Opening borders and France's entry into the Common Market (Treaty of Rome, 1957);
- The escalating Algerian War and accompanying inflationary pressures;
- The imminent entry into the workforce of the post-war baby boom generation.

The Third Plan's development, tied to General Charles de Gaulle's vision for national and state recovery, introduced two significant changes: the use of national accounting to set a gross domestic product growth target and test internal consistency, and a forward-looking approach with long-term projections (1955–1965).

Execution of the Third Plan was marked by the 1959 Rueff stabilization plan.

Recovery occurred faster than anticipated, but at the cost of slowed growth, largely offset by the 1960–1961 interim plan.

=== Fourth Plan (1962–1965) ===
By 1960, the French economy was clearly on a path of sustained growth, transitioning from scarcity to relative abundance, with mass consumption emerging.

In this new economic context, the original principles of planning expanded. The focus shifted from directing production to priority sectors to ensuring optimal conditions for economic and social development. The Fourth Plan targeted modernization of "lagging" sectors (hospital sector, motorways, telecommunications, and national education).

Planning became more indicative, setting goals not solely dependent on the state. While increasingly macroeconomic, it incorporated social considerations.

The law of August 4, 1962, approving the Plan for Economic and Social Development, defined parliamentary approval procedures for plan legislation for the first time.

This applied to the Fourth Plan, a high point in French planning history.

Its development benefited from favorable conditions: the leadership of the new Commissioner General, Pierre Massé; the 1960–1962 economic climate and steady global growth; and the commitment of Charles de Gaulle and the government to the "ardent obligation" of planning as a key tool for asserting economic policy choices. Procedural innovations, such as the creation of the Conseil Supérieur du Plan, consultation with the Conseil Économique et Social on major directions, and the reintegration of the CGT into modernization commissions, fostered a consensual atmosphere.

The Fourth Plan revolved around three objectives:

Strong growth while maintaining major economic balances;

A doubling of the growth rate of collective infrastructure compared to GDP; Efforts to address social and regional inequalities, focusing on distributing the benefits of expansion, or, in Pierre Massé's words, "sharing the surplus," particularly for collective services.

The Fourth Plan was the most successfully executed of all plans. However, two events stood out: the failure of the 1964 Conference des Revenus and the beginning of a decline in France's fertility rate in the same year.

=== Fifth Plan (1966–1970) ===
The Fifth Plan aimed to balance rapid industrial growth with social progress through expanded collective infrastructure, amid increased competition due to open borders. It set indicative price and wage guidelines to curb inflation. To prevent economic overheating, its growth target was slightly lower than that of the Fourth Plan.

Enhancing production competitiveness and controlling income and price trends became primary concerns.

The May 1968 unrest disrupted the Fifth Plan's execution. While growth remained unaffected, prices surged, leading to a slowdown in collective infrastructure development. The French economy's performance was constrained by inadequate vocational training and poor management of workplace social relations.

=== Sixth Plan (1971–1975) ===
The Sixth Plan prioritized industrial imperatives, with nuclear programs and the TGV championed by Charles de Gaulle and continued by President Georges Pompidou after the 1969 referendum. For the first time, the concept of fonction collective emerged, broadening the scope of collective infrastructure planning.

The development of the turbotrain, precursor to the TGV, connecting Paris to Lyon in two hours, was confirmed in 1972 by Transport Minister Robert Galley, following trials at 220 km/h in spring 1972 and 300 km/h that summer.

Initially abandoned due to "opposition from aircraft manufacturers and Air Inter" and high costs (1.41 billion francs), the project was revived after a March 26, 1971, interministerial council approved a Paris-Lyon link by 1978 or 1979, costing over 1.5 billion francs and deemed profitable.

Olivier Guichard, Minister of Regional Planning and Equipment, favored enhanced air links or an aérotrain, but Galley reaffirmed the decision in 1972. On March 23, the SNCF unveiled the turbotrain à grande vitesse, or TGV 001, at Alsthom's Belfort plant.

A third-generation successor to the gas-turbine ETG trains, operating successfully since March 16, 1970, at 160 km/h on the Paris-Caen-Cherbourg line, the TGV held export potential, attracting interest from the United States, where the Federal Department of Transportation commissioned Sofrerail for high-speed rail expertise in June 1972.

Meanwhile, EDF accelerated nuclear deployment during the Sixth Plan, commissioning six new reactors. In May 1969, Ambroise Roux outlined a rationalization agreement with his former partner Alstom, in which Thomson-Brandt held an 18% stake. By November 1969, the CGE acquired 50% of Alstom's capital. This followed the purchase of boiler and steam turbine assets from Stein et Roubaix and Rateau, despite earlier mentions of a 40% stake.

Facing intensifying global competition and an increasingly specialized international division of labor, the Sixth Plan addressed structural constraints on the French economy: the significant agricultural population, the need for better enterprise management and social relations, and housing shortages hindering workforce mobility.

The Sixth Plan aligned with President Georges Pompidou's priorities—strong growth and industrial focus—while aiming for low inflation, faster growth in collective infrastructure than in production, and improved living conditions.

In regional planning, the Sixth Plan granted medium-sized cities (20,000 to 100,000 inhabitants) greater political autonomy in territorial development for the first time.

However, the 1973 first oil crisis halved growth rates within OECD countries, despite advanced nuclear and TGV programs. The Trente Glorieuses ended as France completed post-war reconstruction and bridged major infrastructure gaps. Most households now owned cars, appliances, and televisions.

The combination of these unforeseen yet predictable events caused a sharp growth slowdown, revealing the limits of political control over the economy.

The Sixth Plan's execution was consequently compromised. The Cultural Development Council was established.

=== Seventh Plan (1976–1980) ===
The difficulty of forecasting amid major global crises, such as the oil crises of 1973 and 1979, soaring oil prices, and dollar fluctuations, made planning increasingly challenging. The Seventh Plan marked a questioning of planning's relevance, prepared during a period of slowed global growth. Initial international scenarios, deemed too pessimistic, were revised to set more ambitious growth and employment targets.

The unpredictable external context was considered for collective infrastructure, with 25 priority action programs (PAPs) allocated 110 billion francs across ministry budgets, achieving satisfactory execution and reflecting heightened public finance selectivity.

During execution, the Commissariat Général du Plan produced a report on adapting the Seventh Plan, highlighting themes that shaped later plans: adapting industry to global competition and addressing the financial fragility of French firms.

=== Eighth Plan (1981–1985) ===
In 1978, Commissioner Michel Albert described the economic crisis as "not a cyclical break but a structural rupture," emphasizing tighter constraints. He noted the Plan's role in reminding that not everything is possible simultaneously.

Projections, however, downplayed the second oil crisis's impact.

Prepared with input from foreign experts Wassily Leontief and Sir Andrew Shonfield, the Eighth Plan employed the DMS macroeconomic model to craft an employment-focused economic policy within external constraints. Various policy options were computer-analyzed, which Pierre Massé called "mathematics in the service of democracy."

Ultimately, the Eighth Plan was neither presented to Parliament nor implemented, as a change in majority suspended it.

=== Ninth Plan (1984–1988) ===
Following François Mitterrand's election in May 1981, the government under Pierre Mauroy sought to revive planning while modernizing its methods. The interim plan (1982–1983), a consumption-driven stimulus, fell short of expectations. The law of July 29, 1982, reforming planning, introduced a complex framework: an 80-member national planning commission, a two-phase plan, priority execution programs (PPEs) succeeding PAPs, state-region contracts, and contracts with public enterprises.

The five-year fixed-horizon plan persisted but adopted a decentralized, contractual approach, empowering regions, which gained development responsibilities under decentralization laws. State-public enterprise relations were governed by multi-year conventions and contracts.

The July 29, 1982, law and January 21, 1983, decree established state-region contracts, emphasizing partnership in planning and regional partnership in planning and regional development.

Post-rigour policy, the Ninth Plan aimed to curb inflation through wage cost control, keeping net wage growth below productivity gains. Investment was to return to pre-1975 levels, technological gaps in competitive industries were to be closed, and open borders were prioritized, with the franc anchored in the European Monetary System. Restoring corporate financial health was a key focus.

=== Tenth Plan (1989–1992) ===
In the Tenth Plan, the international context was as prominent as during the Monnet Plan. Its horizon, initially 1993, was set to 1992 to align with the single market's launch. Macroeconomic analysis relied on the European Commission's 1988–1992 European scenario.

Planning served three functions: long-term foresight via the "Entrer dans le XXIe siècle" report by the Horizon 2000 group; medium-term economic projections by the Perspectives Économiques group, involving public and private forecasting teams, CEE, and OECD experts; and coherence in plan preparation.

The plan, now termed "strategic," shifted from forecasting to defining key actions for the period.

Its commitment level differed from past plans. Less binding in programmed sections, as PAPs and PPEs were phased out, it was strengthened in contractual state-region contracts, retaining financial programming. It focused on structural orientations and qualitative goals: high employment, social cohesion, and adaptation to the European market.

The second generation of contracts (1989–1993) improved on the first (1984–1988) with greater selectivity, simplified procedures, and enhanced decentralization, with regional prefects playing a larger role. Regions like Brittany, Limousin, Rhône-Alpes, and Basse-Normandie conducted medium- and long-term studies, leading to development plans.

The European dimension included contributions to EU structural funds.

Contract funding rose by 25% (52 billion francs from the state, nearly 46 billion from regions). State priorities supported regions with industrial conversion challenges (Lorraine, Nord, Champagne-Ardenne) and rural areas (Auvergne, Poitou-Charentes).

Public awareness grew of evaluation's importance, more advanced in Anglo-Saxon countries, providing citizens with policy impact data, optimizing resource allocation, and enhancing state accountability.

The January 22, 1990, decree defined evaluation as assessing whether legal, administrative, or financial means achieved a policy's intended effects and objectives. It established an interministerial evaluation framework, with the CIME (comité interministériel de l'évaluation), chaired by the Prime Minister, and the CSE (conseil scientifique de l'évaluation), comprising 11 independent experts consulted on funded studies.

=== From the Eleventh Plan project to the plan's redefinition (1992–2006) ===
Prepared in 1992 through consultative commissions, the Eleventh Plan project, intended for 1993–1997, was not adopted by the government following the March 1993 elections, which favored quinquennial laws for economic policy. The crisis of French planning became evident.

Nevertheless, the third generation of state-region contracts (1994–1998) emerged. The 1991 Université 2000 plan, involving all local authorities to assess higher education trends and set five-year programs, strengthened consultation practices. The CIAT of October 3, 1991, endorsed the contractual approach, tasking regional prefects with drafting strategy proposals for state action. These informed ministerial budget drafts, while regional council presidents were encouraged to develop regional plans through broad consultation.

The state's total commitment reached 67.5 billion francs, a 32% increase from the previous generation.

With urban contract funds, the state allocated over 76 billion francs to this generation, supporting rural development, education, research, transport infrastructure, and economic competitiveness. An evaluation system for contracts was established, with dedicated funding.

The CIAT in Mende on July 12, 1993, planned a territorial development law and national debate. Contracts were defined as key territorial planning tools, with state interventions tailored to regional economic conditions to promote solidarity.

In December 1993, Prime Minister Édouard Balladur tasked Jean de Gaulle, a Paris deputy, with a mission to reflect on "the future of the Plan and the role of planning in French society," resulting in a report titled "L'avenir du Plan et la place de la planification dans la société française."

== See also ==
- Economic planning
- Economic history of France

== Bibliography ==
- Broder, Albert (1998). Histoire économique de la France au XXe siècle, 1914-1997 (in French). Paris: Ophrys. ISBN 978-2708008533.
- Cohen, Stephen S. (1977). Modern Capitalist Planning: The French Model. Berkeley, CA: University of California Press.
- Commissariat Général du Plan (1961). Rapport Général du IVe Plan de Développement Économique et Social (1962–1965) (in French). Paris: Documentation Française.
- Commissariat Général du Plan (1978). Rapport sur l'Adaptation du VIIe Plan (in French). Paris: Documentation Française.
- Commissariat Général du Plan (1983). Rapport Général du IXe Plan de Développement Économique et Social (1984–1988) [General Report on the 9th Economic and Social Development Plan (1984-1988)] (in French). Paris: Documentation Française.
- Commissariat Général du Plan (1988). Rapport Général du Xe Plan de Développement Économique et Social (1989–1992) (in French). Paris: Documentation Française.
- Commissariat Général du Plan (1989). Entrer dans le XXIe siècle: Rapport du groupe Horizon 2000 (in French). Paris: Documentation Française.
- Commissariat Général du Plan (1990a). Rapport sur les Contrats de Plan État-Région 1989–1993 (in French). Paris: Documentation Française.
- Commissariat Général du Plan (1990b). Rapport sur l'Évaluation des Politiques Publiques 1990 (in French). Paris: Documentation Française.
- Commissariat Général du Plan (1994). Rapport sur les Contrats de Plan État-Région 1994–1998 (in French). Paris: Documentation Française.
- Estrin, Saul; Holmes, Peter (1983). French Planning in Theory and Practice. London: George Allen & Unwin.
- Fourastié, Jean (1979). Les Trente Glorieuses, ou la révolution invisible de 1946 à 1975 (in French). Paris: Fayard.
- Hayward, Jack (1986). The State and the Market Economy: Industrial Patriotism and Economic Intervention in France. Brighton: Wheatsheaf Books.
- Kindleberger, Charles P. (1975). Economic Growth in France and Britain, 1851-1950. Cambridge, MA: Harvard University Press.
- Lutz, Vera (1969). Central Planning for the Market Economy. London: Longmans.
- Massé, Pierre (1966). Le Plan ou l'anti-hasard (in French). Paris: Gallimard.
- Schmidt, Vivien A. (1996). From State to Market? The Transformation of French Business and Government. Cambridge: Cambridge University Press.
- OECD (1975). Regional Development Policies in France. Paris: OECD Publishing.
- OECD (1985). The Governance of Land Use in France. OECD Regional Development Studies. Paris: OECD Publishing. doi:10.1787/9789264268791-en. ISBN 978-92-64-26878-4.
- OECD (1990). Regional Development Policies in France. Paris: OECD Publishing.
- OECD (1990). Evaluation of Public Policies in France. Paris: OECD Publishing.
- OECD (1995). Regional Development Policies in France. Paris: OECD Publishing.
