= Centre d'Etudes Prospectives et d'Informations Internationales =

International economy think tank in Paris

CEPII
- Centre d'Etudes Prospectives et d'Informations Internationales
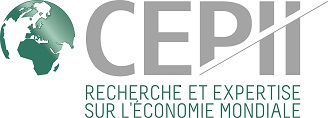

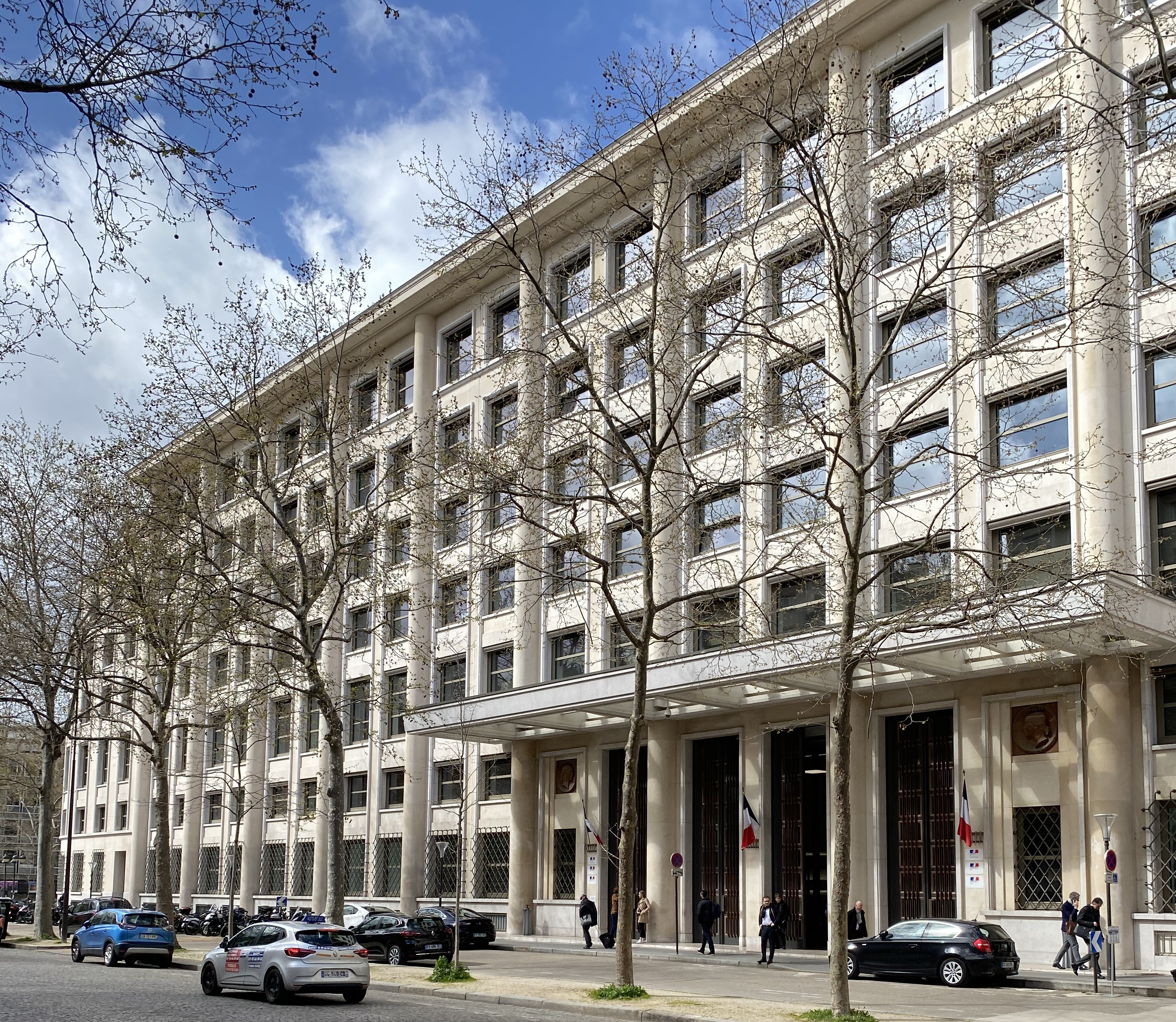
- Fontenoy-Ségur government office complex, seat of CEPII since 2017
- Predecessor: GEPEI
- Formation: 1978
- Headquarters: 20, avenue de Ségur
- Location: Paris, France
- Founder: Michel Courcier
- Director: Antoine Bouët
- Chairman: Jean Lemierre
- Funding: French government
- Website: http://www.cepii.fr/

The Centre d'Études Prospectives et d'Informations Internationales (lit. 'Centre for Prospective Studies and International Information'), generally referred to by its acronym CEPII, is a French institute for research in international economics. It is government-funded and part of the Office of the Prime Minister, within a network coordinated by France Stratégie.

The origins of CEPII go back to the creation in 1963 by French official Michel Courcier of the GEPEI (French: Groupe d'Études Prospectives des Échanges Internationaux), rebranded GEPI (French: Groupe d'Études Prospectives Internationales) in the 1970s. In 1978, CEPII was given permanent status by government order, with Courcier as its founding director.

The CEPII has a core team of around 30 economists. The four main research areas are: factor markets and growth; the international financial and monetary system; EU economy; international trade models.

== History ==
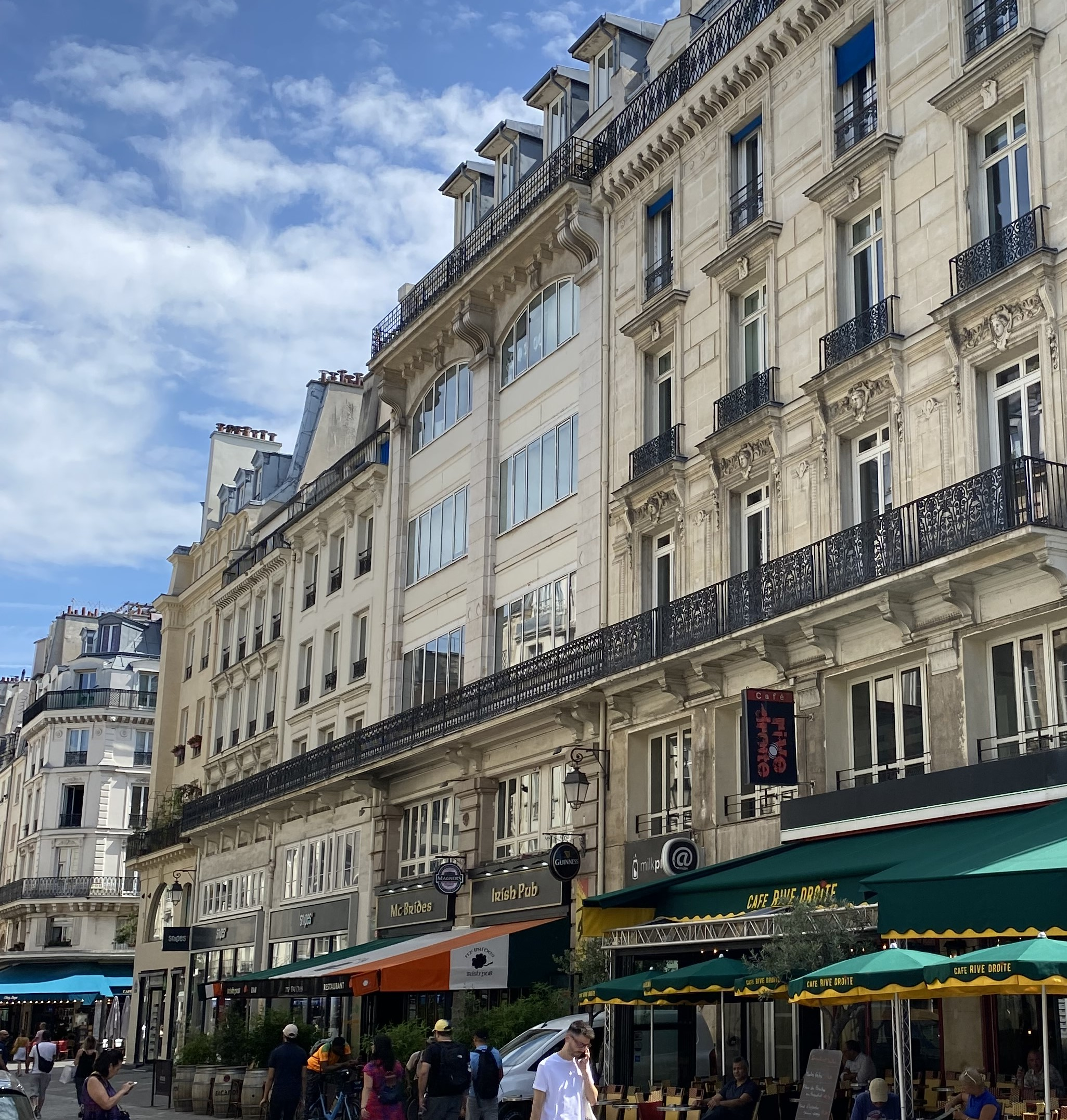
Building at 54-58, rue Saint-Denis in Paris, location of CEPII in the 1970s

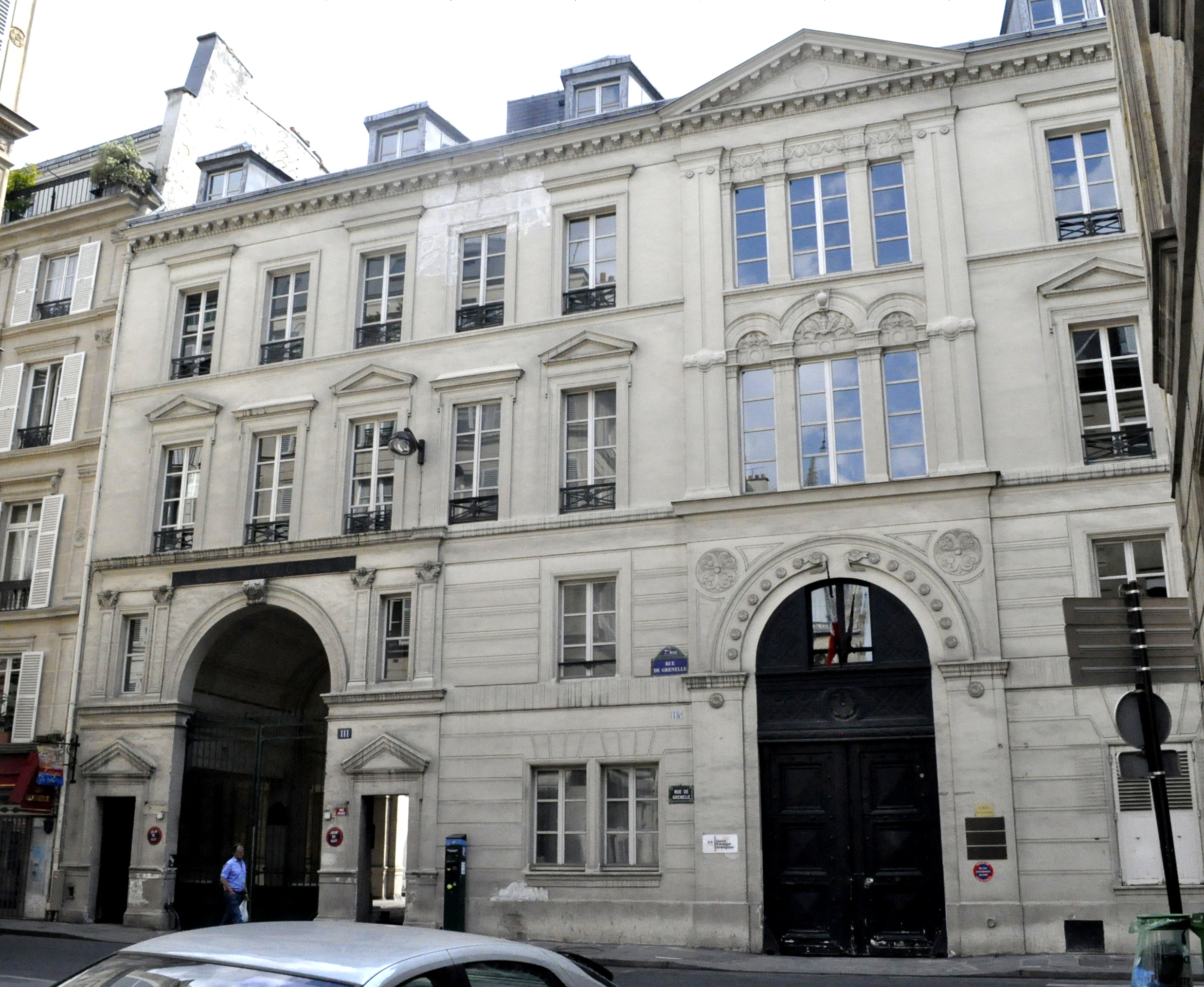
Building at 113, rue de Grenelle in Paris, location of CEPII from 2010 to 2017

=== Precursors ===
Michel Courcier had started his career after the liberation of France in the research service of the Ministry of Finance, and had assisted several former French colonies such as Cambodia, Madagascar and Senegal in their creation of a national accounting framework. From his international experience, he gained a belief that the methodologies and achievements of French national accounting could and should be expanded to the international level, which became the driving insight for the creation of GEPEI in 1963. The research group was hosted by the Centre Français du Commerce Extérieur (CFCE), a trade promotion agency of the French government. An early opportunity came with the preparation of President Charles de Gaulle's visit to the Soviet Union in June 1966, for which the GEPEI prepared briefing materials and from which it developed regular relationships with the Soviet Gosplan. The GEPEI thus became a leading center of expertise on the economy of the Communist bloc. Meanwhile, its research team was joined by economists such as Gérard Lafay in 1966, Anton Brender in 1969,, or Jean Pisani-Ferry in 1977. By the early 1970s, Courcier and Lafay had developed an economic model of the global economy.

=== Founding ===
In 1978, Prime Minister Raymond Barre, on advice from General Planning Commissioner Michel Albert and from his own economic adviser Jean-Claude Casanova, reformed the GEPI by expanding its resources, relocating it within the machinery of government from CFCE to the General Planning Commission, and rebranding it as CEPII. CEPII thus acquired an interagency profile mirrored by its board (French: Conseil du CEPII) which brought together the heads or deputy heads of major government organizations with economic expertise such as the Planning Commission, the Direction du Trésor, INSEE, the Directorate for External Economic Relations (later merged into the Trésor), the Direction Générale de l'Industrie (later merged into the Directorate General for Enterprise), the Bank of France, and the Secretariat-General for National Defence.

=== Development ===
The GEPEI was initially established in Paris on Quai Branly, then Avenue d'Iéna, then on 54-48, rue Saint-Denis. In late 1980, its successor CEPII moved from there to 9, rue Georges Pitard, where it remained for three decades. In 2010 CEPII relocated to 113, rue de Grenelle, then in 2017 to 20, avenue de Ségur in Paris.

The CEPII developed a series of publication formats: the monthly Lettre du CEPII from May 1979,, the quarterly Économie Prospective Internationale from January 1980 (rebranded Économie Internationale in 1993), working papers (French: documents de travail) from 1984, the yearly essay L'Économie mondiale from 1991, and a first website in 1996.

=== Merger with OFCE ===
In late 2023, a government-commissioned report by economists Jean-Luc Tavernier and Nicolas Véron recommended a merger between CEPII and French Observatory of Economic Cycles (OFCE), another government-funded think tank that focuses on domestic economics. Upon the report's publication, Prime Minister Élisabeth Borne endorsed the recommendation.

As of May 2023, OFCE was ranked 16th worldwide (and first in France) among economic think tanks by the RePEc initiative.

== Leadership ==
The successive chief executives (French: Directeur) of the CEPII have been:

- Michel Courcier, July 1978 - December 1979 (and head of the GEPEI, then GEPI since 1963)
- Christian Sautter, January 1980 - May 1981
- Yves Berthelot, July 1981 - August 1985
- Jean-Michel Charpin, September 1985 - March 1990
- Anton Brender, March 1990 - March 1992
- Jean Pisani-Ferry, June 1992 - June 1997
- Jean-Claude Berthélemy, January 1998 - March 2000
- Lionel Fontagné, March 2000 - June 2006
- Agnès Bénassy-Quéré, July 2006 - December 2012
- Sébastien Jean, December 2012 - August 2022
- Antoine Bouët, since October 2022

Chairs of the Conseil du CEPII:

- Philippe Huet, July 1978 - December 1982
- Michel Albert, December 1982 - December 1995
- Francis Mer, December 1995 - March 2000
- Michel Camdessus, March 2000 - July 2004
- Christian Stoffaës, July 2004 - 2009
- Jean Lemierre, since November 2009

The CEPII created a Scientific Committee (French: Comité scientifique) in 2000, successively chaired by François Bourguignon (2000-2004), Olivier Blanchard (2004-2007), Francesco Giavazzi (2007-2020?), and Marc Melitz (since 2020?).

== See also ==
- Kiel Institute for the World Economy
- Peterson Institute for International Economics
- Michel Aglietta
