= National Council of Industry =

The National Council of Industry or Conseil national de l’industrie is a French body that is periodically consulted by the Prime Minister of France, from whom it depends. It is grouped under France Stratégie.
