= Haut-Commissariat à la Stratégie et au Plan =

French economic advisory agency, 1946-2006

Coordinates: 48°51′30″N 2°19′07″E

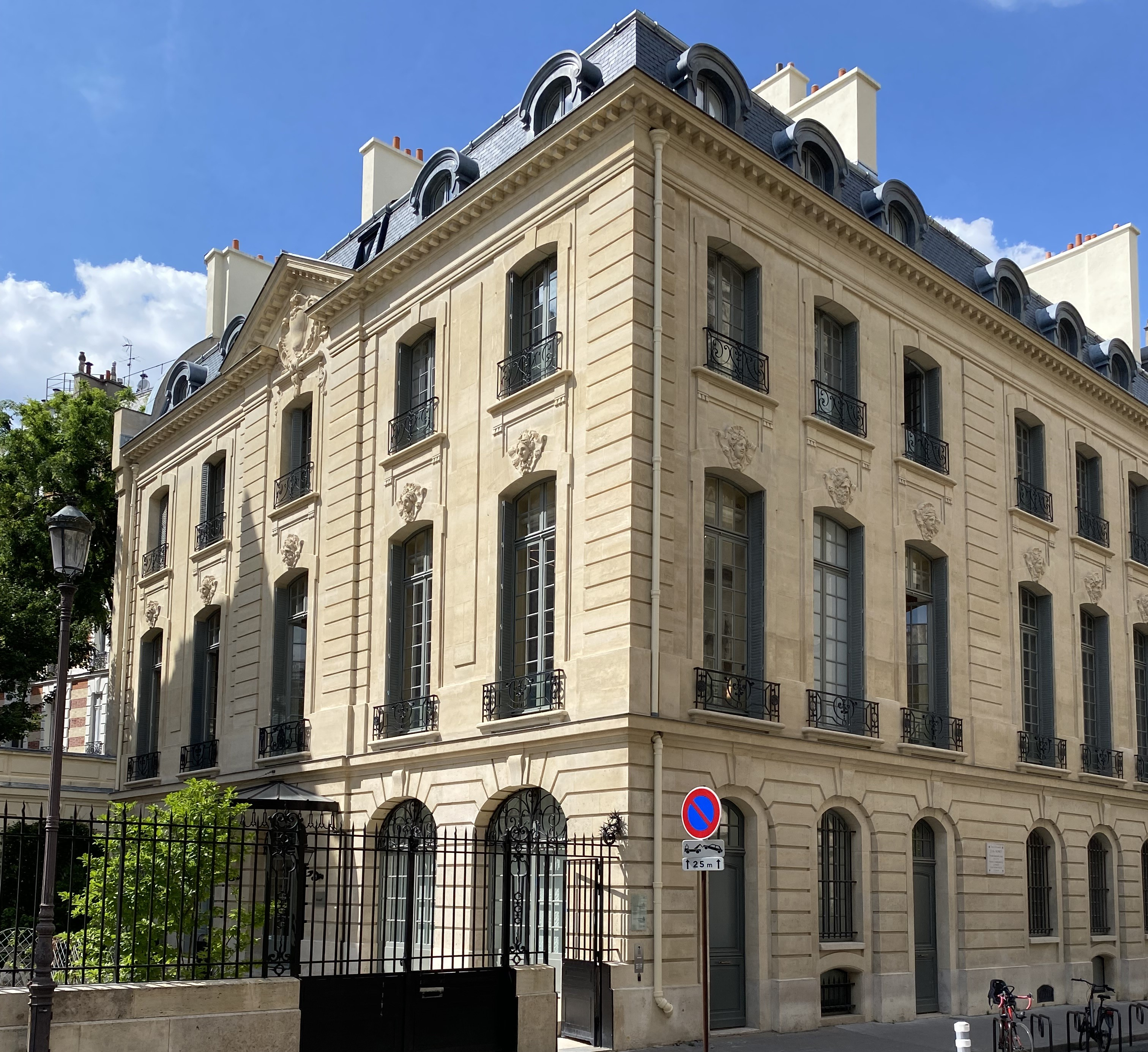
Hôtel de Vogüé at 18, rue de Martignac in Paris, seat of the CGP and of its successor organizations from 1946 to 2017

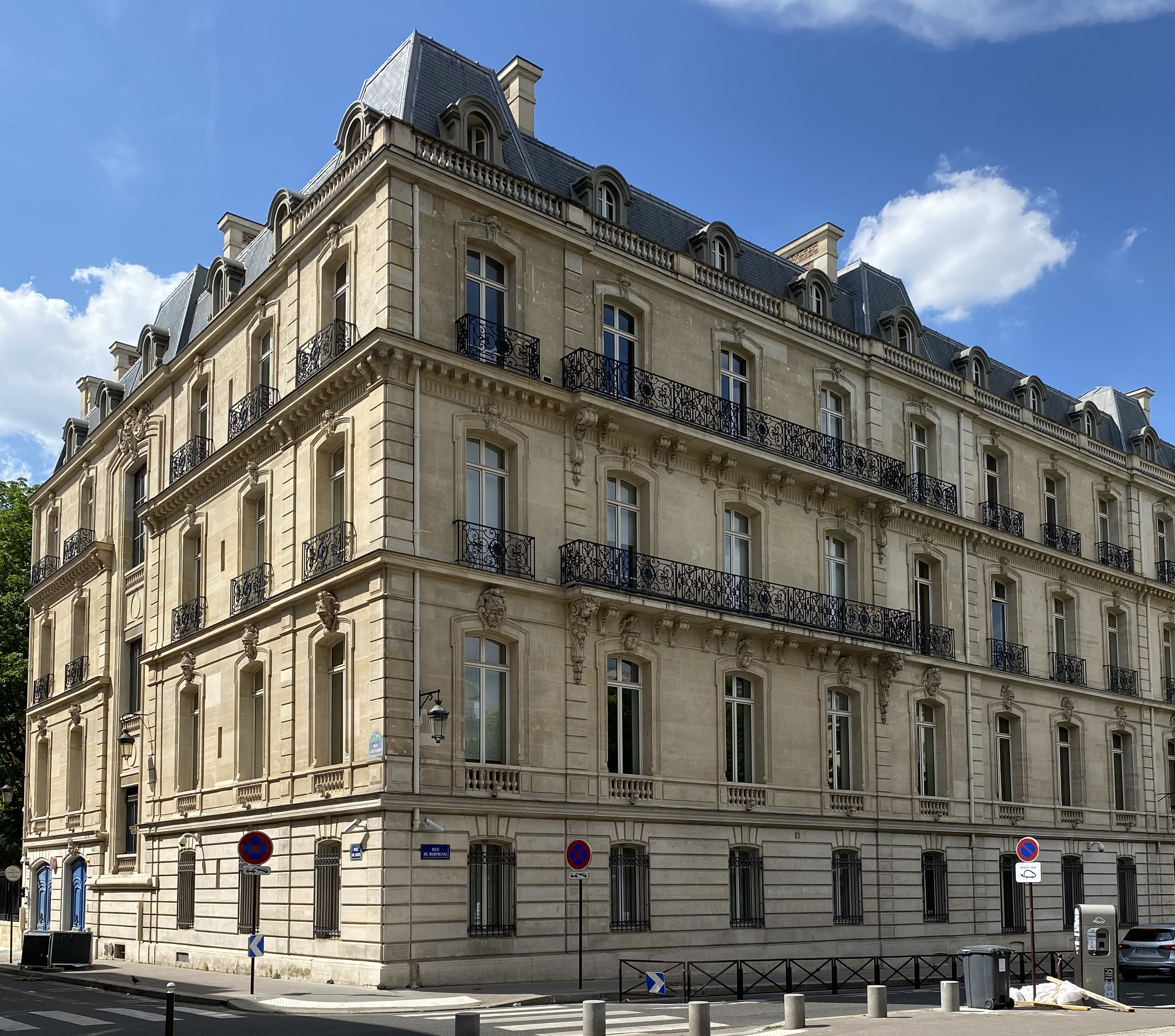
Building at 30, rue Las Cases where the Plan expanded in the late 1960s and remained until 2002

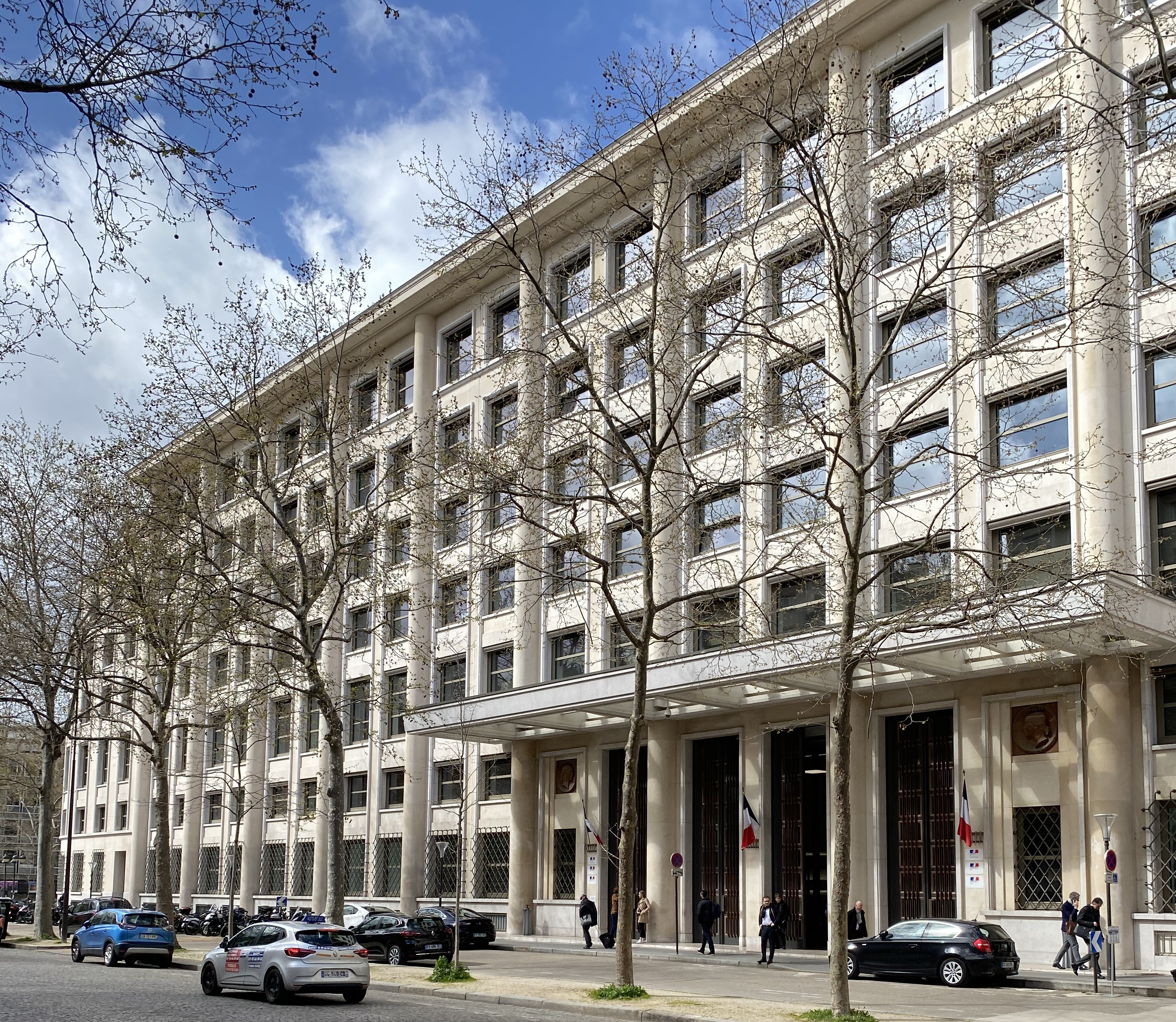
Fontenoy-Ségur government office complex, seat of France Stratégie from 2017 to 2025

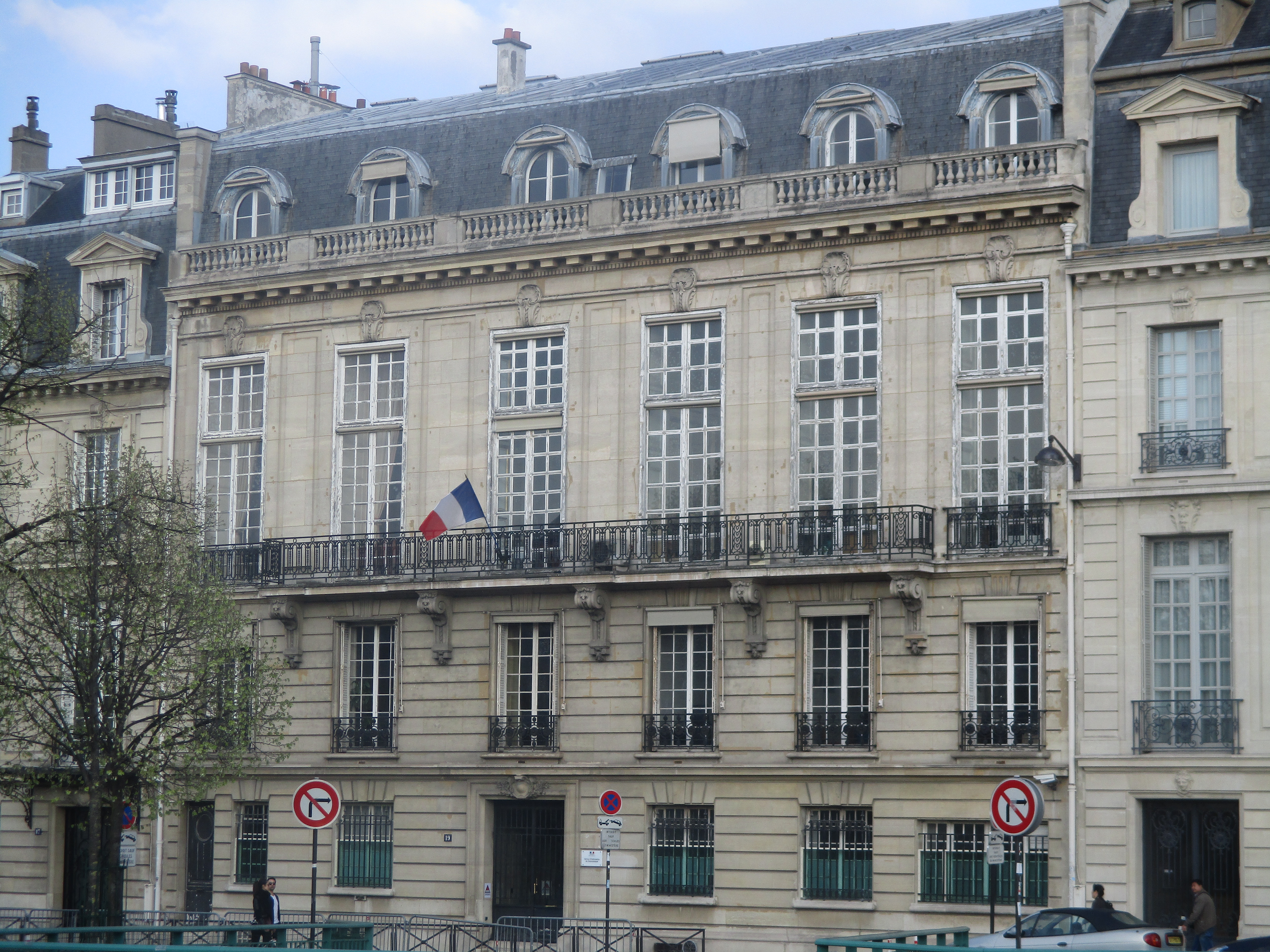
Hôtel de Beistegui at 19, rue de Constantine in Paris, seat of the HCP then of the HCSP since 2020

The Haut-Commissariat à la Stratégie et au Plan (HCSP, lit. 'High Commission for Strategy and Planning') is an advisory body reporting to the government of France, which took its present name and form in May 2025. It was originally founded in the context of the Monnet Plan, intended to address resource scarcity in France in the immediate aftermath of World War II.

With relatively minor changes to its role, it has been successively known as the Commissariat Général du Plan (CGP, lit. 'General Planning Commission', 1946-2006), Centre d'Analyse Stratégique (CAS, lit. 'Center for Strategic Analysis', 2006-2013), Commissariat Général à la Stratégie et à la Prospective (CGSP, lit. 'General Commission for Strategy and Foresight', 2013-2014), and France Stratégie (lit. 'France Strategy', 2014-2025); it has also absorbed the Haut-Commissariat au Plan (HCP, lit. 'High Commission for Planning', 2020-2025), a separate body whose name referred to the original Commissariat Général. All these organizations have been known colloquially as "le Plan" (lit. 'the Plan').

== Commissariat Général du Plan ==
The idea of the Commissariat Général came from exchanges between Charles de Gaulle and Jean Monnet. It was established by De Gaulle as Chairman of the Provisional Government of the French Republic, on 3 January 1946. Monnet was appointed its first General Commissioner, a position he held until moving to Luxembourg in 1952 as first President of the High Authority of the European Coal and Steel Community.

The Commissariat Général's first plan, the Modernization and Re-equipment Plan, was designed to spur economic reconstruction following World War II. Its aims were: (1) to develop national production and foreign trade, particularly in those fields where France is most favourably placed; (2) to increase productivity; (3) to ensure the full employment of manpower; (4) to raise the standard of living and to improve the environment and the conditions of national life. This plan is commonly known as the Monnet Plan after Monnet, its chief architect.

In pursuit of its objectives, the Commissariat Général set production targets for 1950 according to the resources that were then expected to be available, starting with six crucial sectors: coal mining, steel, electricity, rail transport, cement, and farm machinery. Later oil, chemicals, fertilizers, synthetic fertilizers, synthetic fibres, shipbuilding and other sectors were added. The Commission's plan emphasized expansion, modernization, efficiency, and modern management practice. It set investment targets, and allocated investment funds.

The plan’s process – focusing, prioritizing, and pointing the way – has been called "indicative planning" to differentiate it from highly directive and rigid Soviet style planning.

== Centre d'Analyse Stratégique ==
The Centre d'Analyse Stratégique was established by decree on 6 March 2006, succeeding the Commissariat Général. Its stated mission was to advise the Government in the creation and application of economic, social, environmental and cultural policy.

It drew upon an 11-member Steering Committee that included two Deputies, two Senators and a member of the Economic and Social Council.

All of the Centre's work was made public on its official site and in printed editions by La Documentation française. Each year, the Centre also organized around a dozen public events, including seminars, colloquiums and one-day conferences.

== Commissariat Général à la Stratégie et à la Prospective / France Stratégie ==
In April 2013 the CAS was reorganized as the Commissariat Général à la Stratégie et à la Prospective, which was rebranded in June 2014 as France Stratégie without change of legal basis. Like its predecessors, it was government-funded and part of the Office of the French Prime Minister. It also served as hub for a network of research bodies and institutes, including CEPII and the Conseil d'Analyse Économique.

== Haut-Commissariat au Plan ==
The Haut-Commissariat au Plan was established in 2020 as a separate body from France Stratégie with a light secretariat, tailored for politician François Bayrou who became its first and only head.

== Haut-Commissariat à la Stratégie et au Plan ==
In December 2024, Bayrou became Prime Minister of France but initially kept his position as Haut-Commissaire au Plan. In March 2025, former minister Clément Beaune was appointed as head of both France Stratégie and the HCP, and the two bodies were merged by executive order in May.

== Premises ==
The Plan was headquartered in the Hôtel de Vogüé, a historical property at 18, rue de Martignac in Paris; the name "rue de Martignac" was often use metonymically to refer to the Planning Commission.

The Planning Commission expanded to nearby offices at 30, rue Las Cases and 5, rue Casimir Périer, both vacated by Crédit Agricole when the latter relocated its head office to near the Gare Montparnasse in the 1960s. In 2001–2002, these extensions of the Planning Commission relocated from there to another government building in the same neighborhood at 113, rue de Grenelle.

In 2017, France Stratégie moved together with other services of the office of the Prime Minister to the newly renovated office complex known as Ensemble Fontenoy-Ségur, known colloquially as "Ségur".

In 2020, the HCP was located from creation at a former urban mansion on 19, rue de Constantine on the Esplanade des Invalides, a prestige building ereceted in the 1880s that had been the home of Carlos de Beistegui and his family from 1913 to his death in 1970, was acquired by the French state in 1971, and hosted the Service d'Information du Gouvernement, another piece of the office of the Prime Minister, from 1974 to 2017. Since the 2025 merger, the HCSP's head Clément Beaune has kept his office there, while most of the body's staff has remained at "Ségur".

== Leadership ==
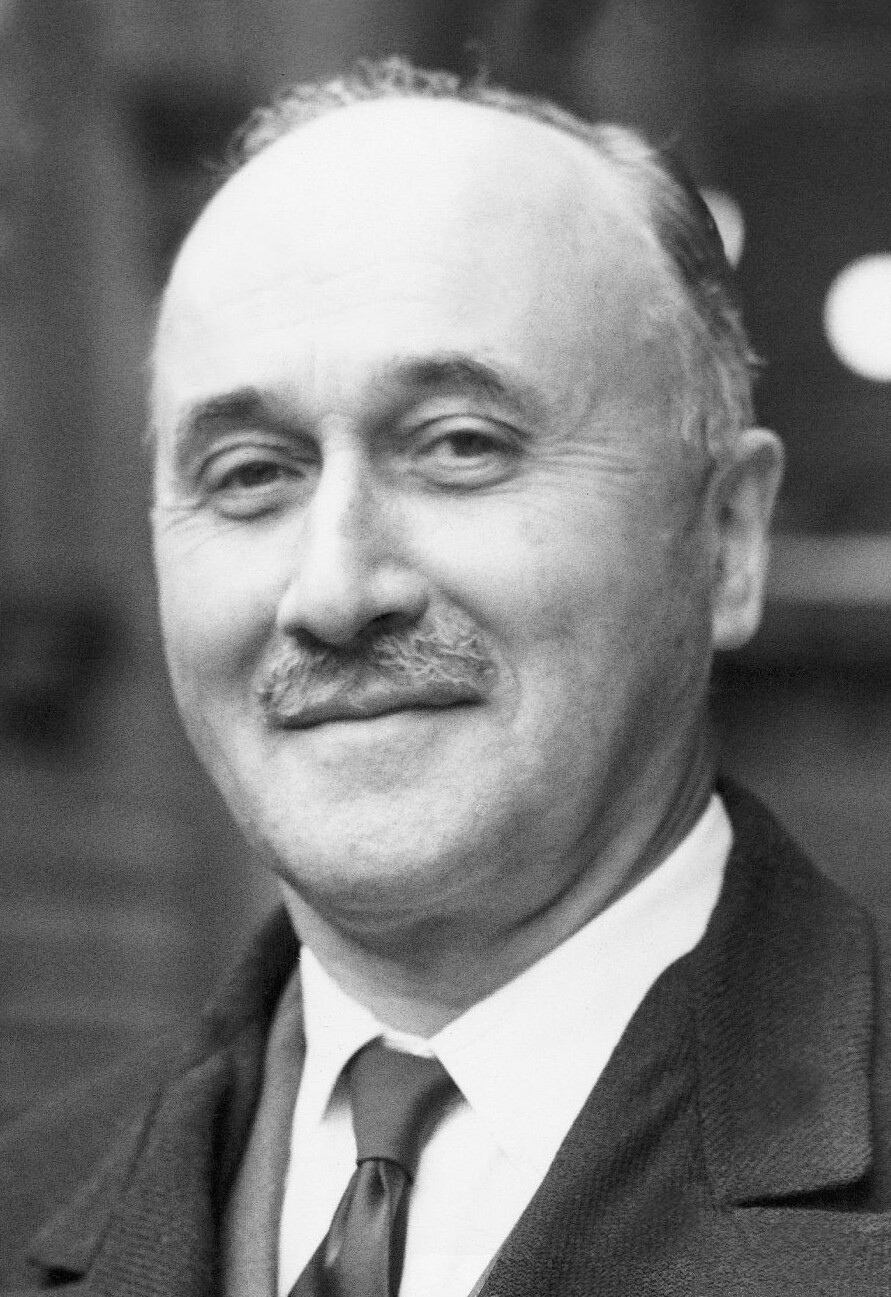
Jean Monnet, founding Commissaire Général du Plan

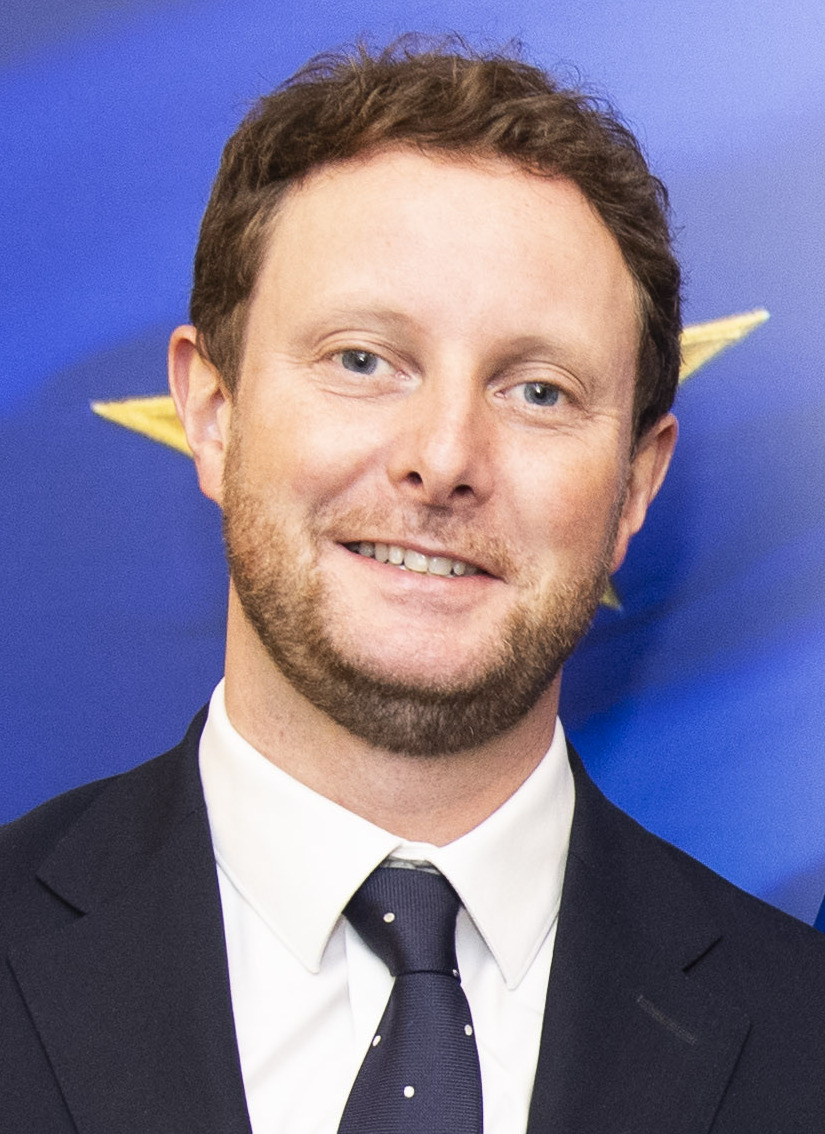
Clément Beaune, current Haut-Commissaire à la Stratégie et au Plan

- Jean Monnet, Commissaire Général, 1946–1952
- Étienne Hirsch, Commissaire Général, 1952–1959
- Pierre Massé, Commissaire Général, 1959–1966
- François-Xavier Ortoli, Commissaire Général, 1966–1967
- René Montjoie, Commissaire Général, 1967–1974
- Jean Ripert, Commissaire Général, 1974–1978
- Michel Albert, Commissaire Général, 1978–1981
- Hubert Prévot, Commissaire Général, 1981–1984
- Henri Guillaume, Commissaire Général, 1984–1987
- Bertrand Fragonard, Commissaire Général, 1987–1988
- Pierre-Yves Cossé, Commissaire Général, 1988–1992
- Jean-Baptiste de Foucauld, Commissaire Général, 1992–1995
- Henri Guaino, Commissaire Général, 1995–1998
- Jean-Michel Charpin, Commissaire Général, 1998–2003
- Alain Etchegoyen, Commissaire Général, 2003–2005
- Sophie Boissard, Commissaire Générale, 2005–2006; Directrice Générale du Centre d'Analyse Stratégique, March 2006 – July 2007
- Philippe Mills, acting Directeur Général, July – December 2007
- René Sève, Directeur Général, December 2007 – 2009
- Vincent Chriqui, Directeur Général, January 2010 – 2013
- Jean Pisani-Ferry, Commissaire Général, May 2013 – January 2017
- Michel Yahiel, Commissaire Général, January 2017 – January 2018
- Gilles de Margerie, Commissaire Général, January 2018 – November 2023
- François Bayrou, Haut-Commissaire au Plan, September 2020 – March 2025
- Cédric Audenis, acting Commissaire Général, November 2023 – March 2025
- Clément Beaune, Haut-Commissaire au Plan and Commissaire Général of France Stratégie, March – May 2025; Haut-Commissaire à la Stratégie et au Plan, since May 2025

== See also ==
- Haut Commissariat au Plan (Morocco)
- Federal Planning Bureau in Belgium
- Bureau for Economic Policy Analysis in the Netherlands
- Number 10 Policy Unit in the United Kingdom
- Economic planning in France
- Economic history of France
