= Natacha Valla =

French economist

Natacha Valla (born January 1, 1976) is a French economist and Dean of the Sciences Po School of Management and Innovation. She was Deputy Director General for monetary policy at the European Central Bank from May 2018 to January 2020. She is also chair of the SUERF, European Money and Finance Forum, editorial board.

== Background and education ==
Valla was born in Marseille, France. When she was six, her family moved to Gabon for her father's career, who was an engineer at EDF. After graduating from high school in Lyon, she was enrolled in a literary Higher School Preparatory Class in the Lycée du Parc. She holds a master's degree from Georgetown University. She is also a graduate from the European University Institute, where she completed her PhD thesis titled Learning and distribution in monetary economics.

== Career ==
Valla started her career as an economist at the European Central Bank in 2001. In 2008, Valla was appointed executive director at Goldman Sachs Global Economic Research, focusing on the study of the Eurozone. From 2014 to 2016, she was deputy director of Centre d'Etudes Prospectives et d'Informations Internationales (CEPII), the main French think tank in international economy according to the World Economic Forum, before joining the European Investment Bank in 2016 as head of Policy Strategy division. During this period, she was also a permanent member of the Conseil d'Analyse Économique, part of the scientific committee of the French Prudential Supervision and Resolution Authority (ACPR), the French banking regulatory body. She was appointed Deputy Director General of the European Central Bank in 2018. In 2021, she joined Lazard as senior advisor, and was appointed president of Conseil National de Productivité in 2022.

== Academic career ==
Valla has published research on numerous subjects in the field of international finance, monetary and applied macro-economics. She was a fellow at the Paris School of Economics and a member of the French Société d'Economie Politique. She is also co-author of a textbook of financial macroeconomics and has taught at the University of Florence, the University of Paris Dauphine, HEC and Sciences Po. She currently teaches at New York University in Abu Dhabi.

== Other activities ==
=== Corporate boards ===
- Wakam, Observer on the Board of Directors (since 2021)
- LVMH, Member of the Board of Directors (since 2016)
- AccorHotels, Member of the Board of Directors (since 2016)
- Autoroutes SA, Member of the Board of Directors
- SCOR SE, Member of the Board of Directors

=== Non-profit organizations ===
- Arte, Member of the Programme Advisory Committee
- Institut Montaigne, Member of the Board of Directors
- Official Monetary and Financial Institutions Forum (OMFIF), Member of the Advisory Council

== Awards ==
In 2000, Valla was awarded the SCE Prize in Computational Economics for her graduate research.

In 2018, Valla was recipient of the French National Order of Merit.

== Personal life ==
Valla is married to Konrad Pesendorfer. She is the mother of two sons and a daughter.
