= Dezernat Zukunft =

German think tank

Dezernat Zukunft (lit. 'Department for the Future') is a think tank based in Berlin, Germany. It was created in 2018 by economists Philippa Sigl-Glöckner and Max Krahé.

== Overview ==
Dezernat Zukunft has received funding, among others, from the European Climate Foundation, the Laudes Foundation, Open Philanthropy, Partners for a New Economy, and the Silicon Valley Community Foundation. Its research on fiscal policy and climate change mitigation has been featured by media such as CNBC, The Economist, and the Financial Times.

== European Macro Policy Network ==
Starting in 2021, Dezernat Zukunft has sponsored the establishment of the European Macro Policy Network, a cluster of like-minded national economic think tanks in European countries.

As of March 2026, EMPN members included, in addition to Dezernat Zukunft and EMPN's own headquarters in Brussels:

- (Austria) Vienna Institute for International Economic Studies (WIIW)
- (Finland) Finnish Centre for New Economic Analysis (UTAK)
- (France) Institut Avant-Garde (IAG)
- (Germany) Chemnitz University of Technology
- (Italy) Luiss Hub for New Industrial Policy and Economic Governance (LUHNIP) at Luiss University
- (Italy) a partnership of Sapienza University of Rome with Fondazione Giacomo Brodolini (FGB)
- (Netherlands) Instituut voor Publieke Economie (IPE)
- (Sweden) Arena Idé

== Funding ==
Dezernat Zukunft has received significant funding from U.S.-based philanthropic organizations, including substantial grants from Open Philanthropy, founded by Facebook co-founder Dustin Moskovitz and his wife Cari Tuna.

== See also ==
- OFCE
