= Cédric Durand =

French economist (born 1975)

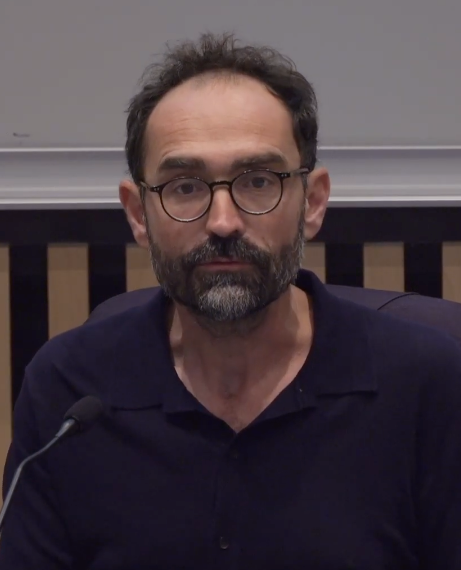
- In a 2024 interview
- Born: 1975 (age 50–51)

Academic background
- Education: School for Advanced Studies in the Social Sciences
- Thesis: Une analyse institutionnaliste de la coordination industrielle : étude des transformations de la métallurgie russe (1992–2001) (2002)
- Doctoral advisor: Jacques Sapir

Cédric Durand (born 1975) is a French economist. He earned a degree from the Grenoble Institute of Political Studies and a doctorate from the School for Advanced Studies in the Social Sciences. His doctoral thesis was supervised by Jacques Sapir, and he did postdoctoral work at the National Autonomous University of Mexico.

After teaching at Claude Bernard University Lyon 1 and Sorbonne Paris North University, he became a professor in the Department of History, Economics and Society (DHES) at the University of Geneva in 2020. His research focuses on globalization, financialization, and the transformations of contemporary capitalism. It is rooted in the tradition of Marxist political economy. Cédric Durand has also advocated for a cyber-socialist and ecological economy and politics, which he calls cyber-ecosocialism.

His recent work focuses on the transformation of capitalism into a kind of technofeudalism where a few very large corporations use their monopoly on data to control social activity and extract rent.

== Political and intellectual engagement ==
In 2011, while a member of the New Anticapitalist Party, Durand together with Razmig Keucheyan, published an opinion piece in Libération entitled "L'isolement du NPA" (The Isolation of the NPA), in which the authors encouraged the party “to engage in a constructive political confrontation with the other currents of the radical left.”

In 2023, he held the Chair of Economics at the Institut La Boétie, a think tank affiliated with La France Insoumise.

Durand has contributed articles to the journal Contretemps.

== Publications ==
- Durand, Cédric, ed. (2013). En finir avec l'Europe (in French). Paris: La Fabrique. ISBN 9782358720489. OCLC 859139507.
- Durand, Cédric (2014). Le capital fictif. Comment la finance s’approprie notre avenir. Essais (in French). Paris: Les prairies ordinaires. ISBN 9782350960937. OCLC 897723704.
- Orléan, André; Durand, Cédric; Cohen, Daniel; Bellofiore, Riccardo, eds. (2018). Penser la monnaie et la finance avec Marx. Autour de Suzanne de Brunhoff (in French). Presses Universitaires de Rennes. ISBN 9782753574786. OCLC 1053807425.
- Durand, Cédric (2020). Technoféodalisme. Critique de l’économie numérique (in French). Paris: La Découverte. ISBN 9782355221156. OCLC 1204202322.
- Durand, Cédric; Keucheyan, Razmig (2024). Comment bifurquer: Les principes de la planification écologique (in French). Zones. ISBN 9782355221910. OCLC 1426859504.
- Durand, Cédric (2025). Faut-il se passer du numérique pour sauver la planète ?. Les Livres de l'Institut La Boétie (in French). Paris: Editions Amsterdam. ISBN 9782354803148. OCLC 1514366890.
