= Alain Etchegoyen =

French philosopher and novelist

Alain Etchegoyen (6 November 1951, Lille – 9 April 2007, Le Mans), was a philosopher and novelist. He was the last Plan Commissionner before that Commission was abrogated. He wrote some twenty books, essays and novels.

A former student of l'École Normale Supérieure, he was a professor in classes prépas at the Lycée Louis-le-Grand, and in a professional lycée in Hauts-de-Seine.

== Career ==
Etchegoyen started his career (1979–1982) in CNRS, then went to the Industry and Research Ministry (1982–1984), before working in the Plan Commission (1984–1985).

In 1985, Etchegoyen founded the Association de l'édition du Corpus des textes philosophiques de langue française. In the middle of the 1980s, he created a consulting company, with Michelin among its customers. At the end of the 1980s, he led the takeover of the faience maker Géo Martel. In the middle of the 1990s, he became administrator of Usinor-Sacilor (now part of Arcelor).

== Books ==
- L'Entreprise a-t-elle une âme? (1990)
- La Valse des éthiques (Prix Médicis essais 1991)
- Eloge de la communication insupportable (1992)
- La Démocratie malade du mensonge (1993), couronné du Grand prix de l'Académie française.
- Vérités ou libertés, la justice expliquée aux adultes (2001)
- Votre devoir est de vous taire (2005)
- Meurtre à la virgule près (2007)
