= Monnet Plan =

Postwar reconstruction plan for France

This article deals with the 1946–50 plan of the immediate post-war period. For the Monnet plan of 1950, see European Coal and Steel Community.

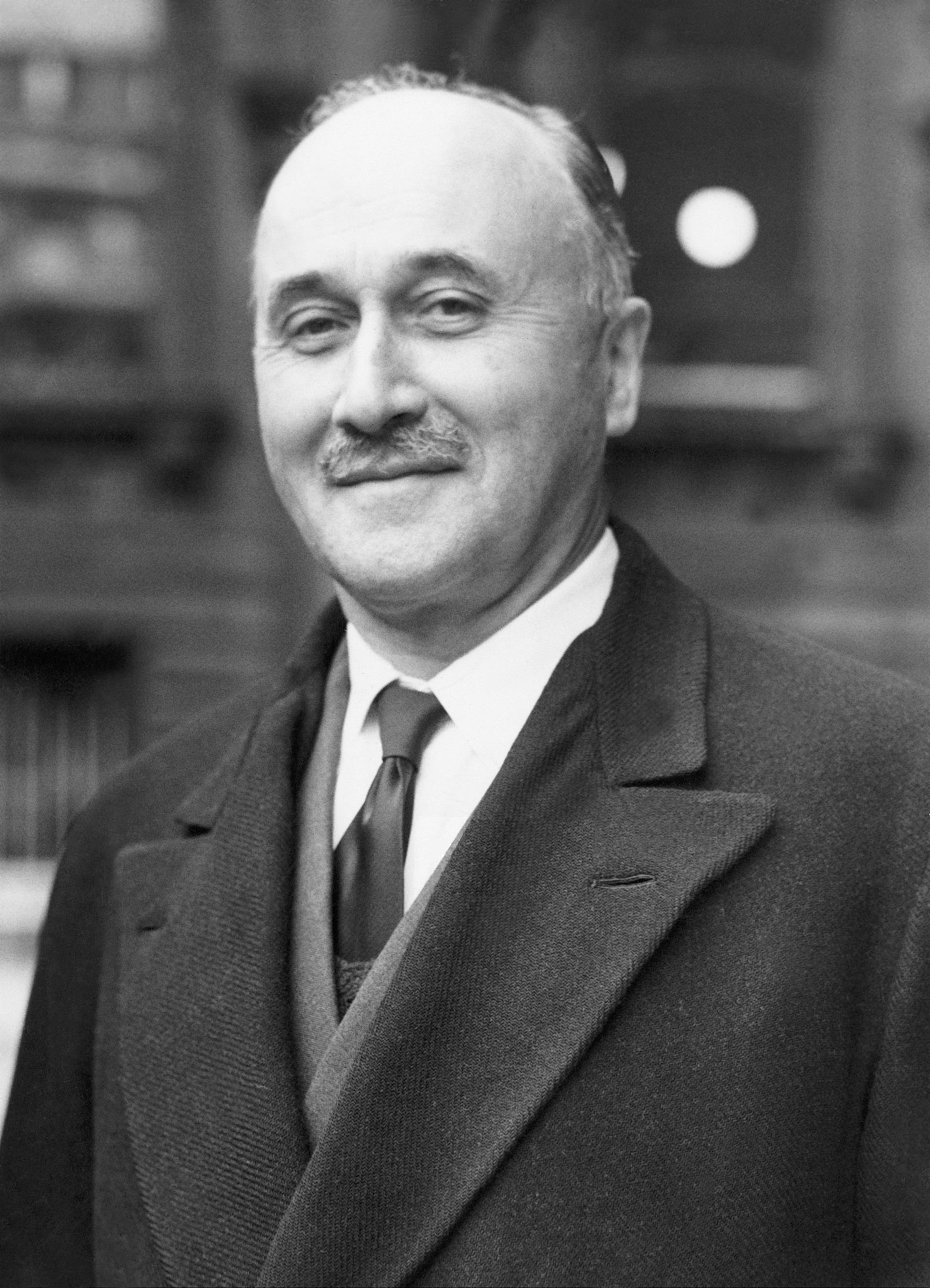
Jean Monnet, French Planning Commissioner, 1946–1952

Faced with the challenge of reconstruction after World War II, France implemented the Modernization and Re-equipment Plan, which was designed to spur economic recovery. This plan is commonly known as the “Monnet Plan” after Jean Monnet, the chief advocate and first head of the General Planning Commission (Le Commissariat général du Plan).

The Monnet Plan emphasized expansion, modernization, efficiency, and modern management practice. It set investment targets, and allocated investment funds. The plan’s process – focusing, prioritizing, and pointing the way – has been called “indicative planning” to differentiate it from highly directive and rigid Soviet-style central planning.

== Background and rationale for a plan ==
France emerged from WWII severely weakened economically. It had been in a period of economic stagnation even when the war broke out and by 1945, national income, in real terms, was little more than half of what it had been in 1929. Further, worker productivity was just one third of the U.S. level, chiefly due to low investment. For example, in France there was one tractor for every 200 people on the land, while in the U.S., there was one for every 43.

The Monnet Plan aimed to increase investment and modernize the French economy. Part of the drive to modernization was to change ways of thinking. For example, the plan promoted machinery adoption in agriculture because “a farmer driving a tractor will no longer think like a farmer following a horse.”

== Implementation ==
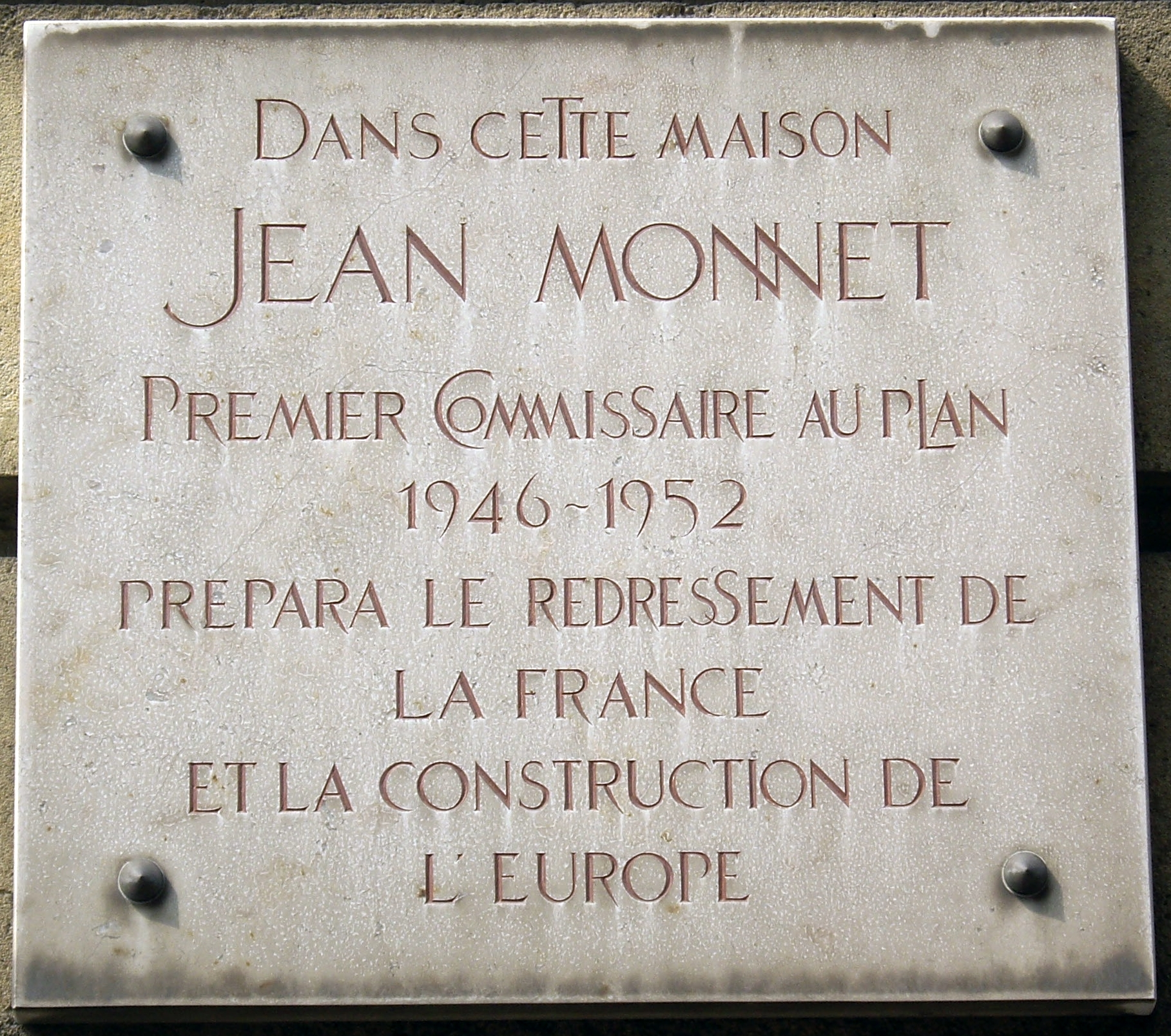
Plaque at 18, rue de Martignac, Paris, the offices of the Planning Commission. It reads: In this house, Jean Monnet, the first Planning Commissioner, 1946-1952, prepared the recovery of France and the construction of Europe.

The General Planning Commission was established on 3 January 1946 by the Chairman of the French Provisional Government, Charles de Gaulle. The formal aims of the Plan were: (1) to develop national production and foreign trade, particularly in those fields where France is most favourably placed; (2) to increase productivity; (3) to ensure the full employment of manpower; (4) to raise the standard of living and to improve the environment and the conditions of national life.

In pursuit of its objectives, the Plan set production and other targets for 1950 according to the resources that were then expected to be available, starting with six crucial sectors: coal mining, steel, electricity, rail transport, cement, and farm machinery. Later oil, chemicals, fertilizers, synthetic fertilizers, synthetic fibres, shipbuilding and other sectors were added.

While targets were set, there was no enforcement mechanism. However, three of the six basic industries had been nationalized: coal, electricity and rail transport. The remaining three were fairly well concentrated and implicitly threatened with nationalization. In the steel industry, capital for expansion was provided from government sources on condition of mergers and restructuring. The Plan had less direct impact on sectors outside the six basic industries and, for example, it never tried in any direct way to hold back sectors such as oil, pharmaceuticals, and cars, which spontaneously found markets and capital to grow fast.

The central feature or "kingpins" of the planning system were the Modernization Commissions. These commissions were a means of communicating the planners’ ideas to those responsible in the economy, and through them to the general public: but they were also a source of information for the planners. More than a thousand people worked on the eighteen Modernization Commissions in 1946 The background and expertise of commission members was intentionally diverse. For example, the Electricity Commission had 22 members, including six heads of firms, three trade unionists, two white-collar workers, five experts, and four civil servants.

A key aspect of the Plan was that it was widely accepted – it was approved by the Communist and Christian trade unions, by farm unions and by industrialists of the National Council of French Employers. This was important because, for example, the Manpower Commission’s proposals were adopted, which allowed the longer, forty-eight-hour week to eventually become the norm. This could not have been done if it had not been accepted by the workforce, and was a crucial factor in French recovery.

== Plan administration ==
Monnet was determined that the General Planning Commission be attached to the Prime Minister’s office rather than under one of the economic ministries. He wanted to avoid permanent negotiations between ministerial departments and was willing to resign, if necessary, on this point. Yergin and Stanislaw argue that this was a brilliant administrative coup and succeeded in insulating the planning function from the vagaries of French politics.

While hundreds of people participated in Modernization Commissions, the General Planning Commission staff was small, and never numbered more than thirty-five senior officials. However, the group was "probably the most creative team in Paris" and included many who would go on to other roles in the French and European government or administration, including future French Prime Minister Felix Gaillard; Robert Marjolin, later one of the founders of the European Common Market; Etienne Hirsch; Pierre Uri; and Paul Delouvrier.

== The role of foreign loans and aid ==
Capital investment was central to the Monnet Plan. The Plan envisaged investing some 24% of national income per year. As the economy’s output was already low, to limit consumption cuts, France aimed to secure loans to finance capital and equipment imports. In March 1946, a French delegation went to Washington with the first publication of the French planning council: Statistical Review of the Economic and Financial Situation of France at the Beginning of 1946. This report outlined France’s needs, resources, and proposed projects, and explained how funds lent would be spent. It was written in English as well as in French, with the U.S. Congress in mind.

On May 28, 1946 an agreement was reached with the U.S. government for approximately $1 billion worth of new funding, plus the prospect of a $500 million loan from the World Bank (IBRD). This was less than the requested $3 billion over three years, but was adequate for the Plan to be launched, and the Modernization and Re-equipment Plan was submitted to the government on 27 November 1946.

The Monnet Plan had called for short term austerity measures, but it had promised a rapid rise in consumption. However, in 1947, due to inflation, drought, and the worst harvest in 150 years, France was threatened with the loss of even basic essentials. The grim postwar situation in Europe was observed by U.S. policymakers, and on June 5, 1947 Secretary of State George Marshall said that "Europe’s requirements for the next three or four years of foreign food and other essential products – principally from America – are so much greater than her present ability to pay that she must have substantial additional help or face economic, social, and political deterioration of a very grave character." Ten months later, on April 3, 1948, the U.S. launched the European Recovery Program (ERP), commonly known as the Marshall Plan. ERP aid was spread over 50 months, and the Modernization and Re-equipment Plan was prolonged for two years to coincide with the 1952 end date of the ERP.

The bulk of France’s ERP aid, just under $3 billion, was channelled to fulfilling the objectives of the Monnet Plan. ERP dollars were used to acquire raw material and machinery imports, which were sold in France for francs. These francs or “counterpart funds,” were allocated by the French government to the Plan. In 1949 and 1950, between 50% and 90% of the Monnet Plan’s resources came from counterpart funds. ERP aid represented 20% of all French investment from 1948 to 1952, and that margin was sufficient for some projects to go ahead that probably would not have otherwise – such as investments in large-capacity steel rolling mills.

== Goals and impact ==
The Monnet Plan's goals were ambitious. The initial objectives were to reach France’s 1938 production level by 1948; to reach the 1929 level, 25% higher, by 1949; and by 1950 to improve on the 1929 level by a further 25%. Although not all of the stated goals were met, Yergin and Stanislaw argue that what the Plan did, at a crucial period, “was provide the discipline, direction, vision, confidence, and hope for a nation that otherwise might have remained in a deep and dangerous malaise.” And it set France on the road to an economic miracle in the 1950s.

The Monnet Plan created the impetus for the Schuman Plan, initiated by Jean Monnet and proposed by French foreign minister Robert Schuman on 9 May 1950. Prewar, France had been the world’s biggest importer of coal, and the Monnet Plan anticipated coal imports from Germany. To avoid the concern, which dated to the prewar period, that coal would be available on more favourable terms to the German market and so provide an advantage to German industry, Schuman aimed to prevent coal and steel firms from acting as cartels which could restrict supply by national market. The Schuman Plan would mean the pooling of markets and the expansion of production. This was viewed as a force for peace in Europe, since "The solidarity in production thus established will make it plain that any war between France and Germany becomes not merely unthinkable, but materially impossible." The Schuman Plan led to the creation of the European Coal and Steel Community, which laid the foundation for the 1958 establishment of the European Economic Community, the forerunner of the European Union.

The Monnet Plan was the first plan produced by the General Planning Commission (Le Commissariat général du Plan), and the agency continued to produce multi-year plans for France until 2006. The General Planning Commission was succeeded by the Center for Strategic Analysis, which was replaced in 2013 by France Stratégie.

== See also ==
- Marshall Plan
- Jean Monnet
- Schuman Declaration
