= OFCE =

Government-funded think tank in Paris

- Observatoire Français des Conjonctures Économiques
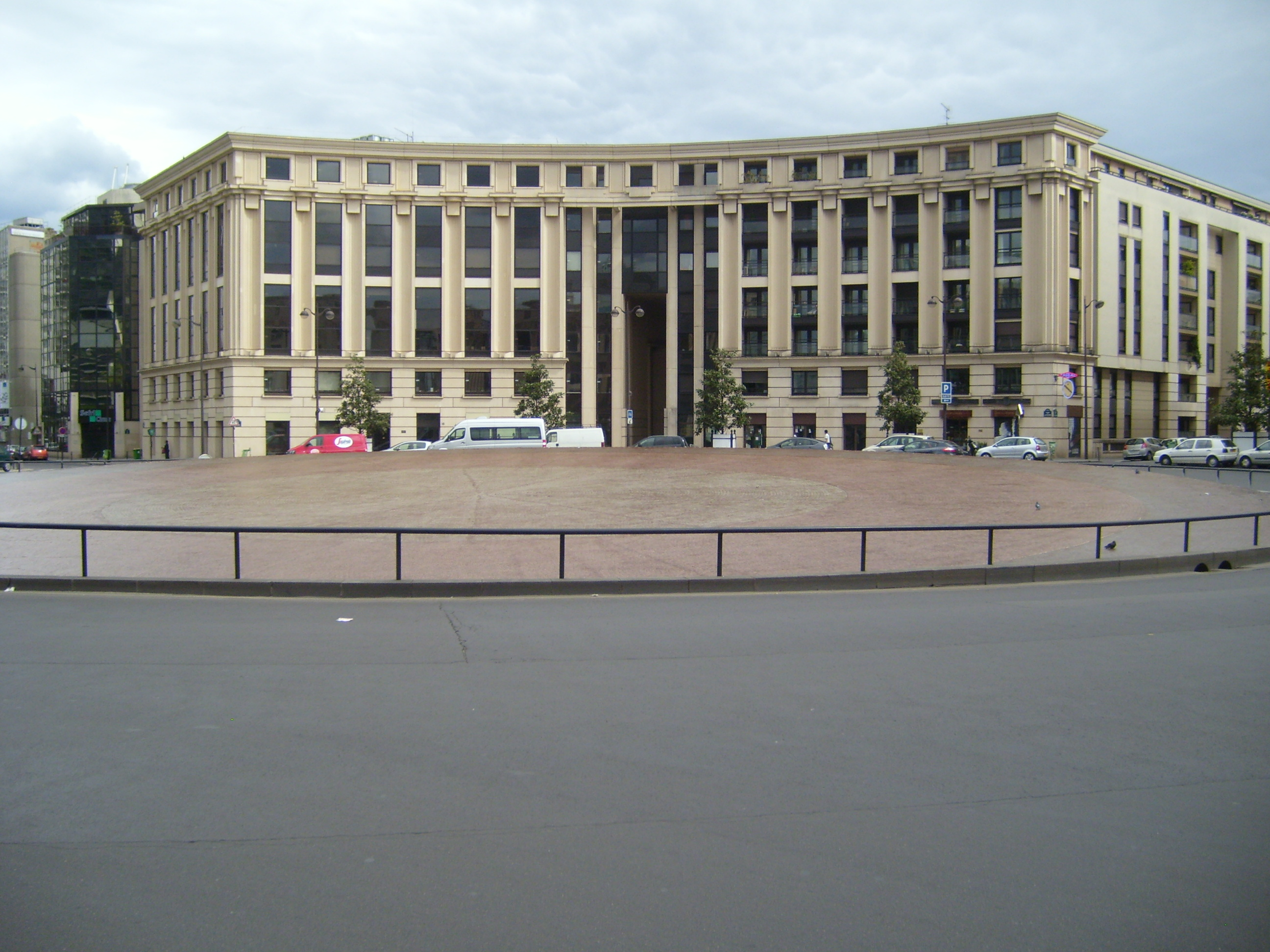
- Building at 10, place de Catalogne in Paris, seat of OFCE since 2017
- Formation: 1981
- Headquarters: 10, place de Catalogne
- Location: Paris, France
- President: Xavier Ragot
- Parent organization: Sciences Po
- Website: https://www.ofce.sciences-po.fr/

The Observatoire Français des Conjonctures Économiques (lit. 'French Observatory of Economic Cycles'), often referred to by its acronym OFCE, is a prominent French economic policy think tank in Paris. It is mostly government-funded and hosted by the Sciences Po higher education organization. OFCE's research is regularly featured in French media, and it has ongoing relationships with French and European public authorities. As of May 2023, OFCE was ranked 16th worldwide (and first in France) among economic think tanks by the RePEc initiative.

== History ==
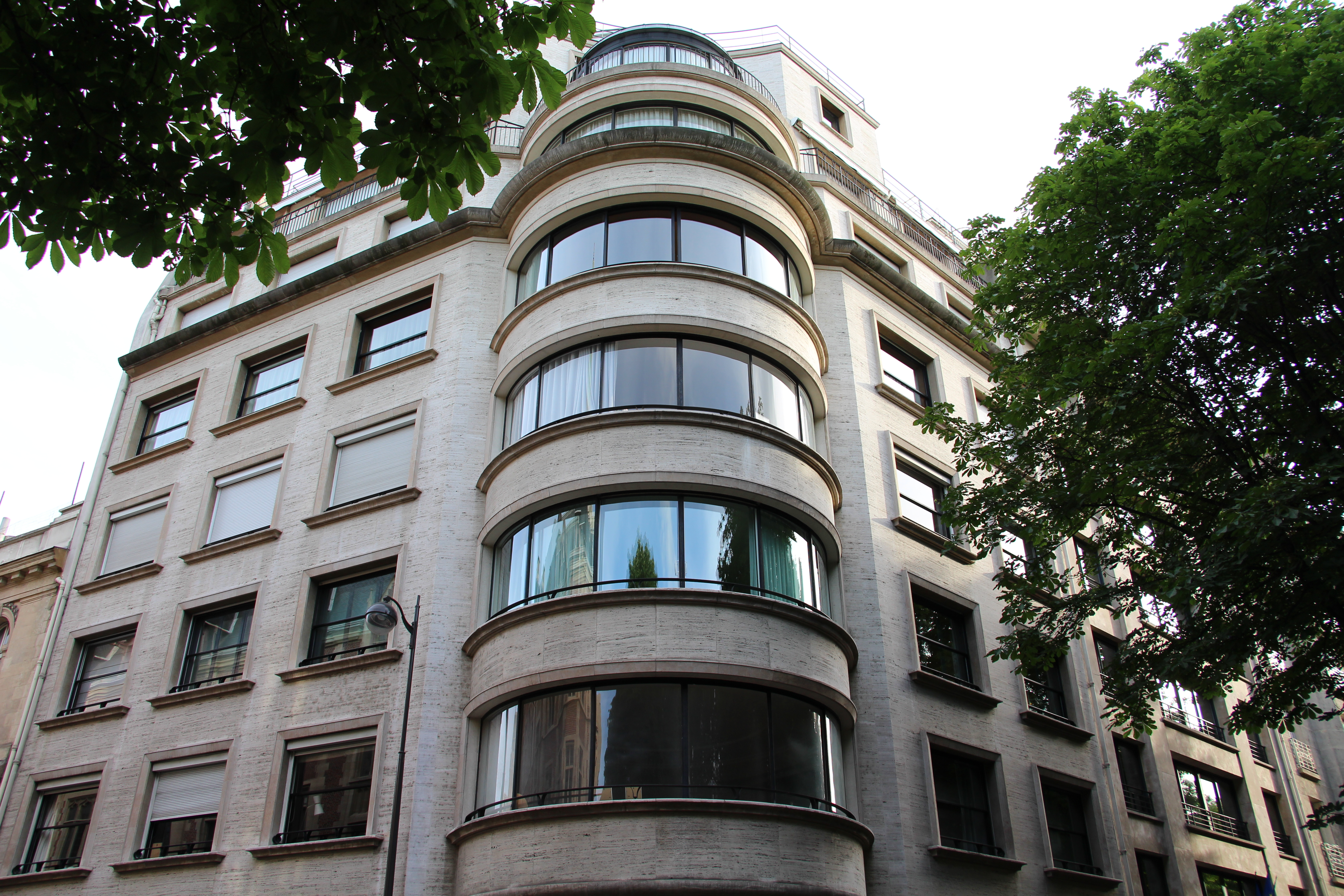
Building at 69, quai d'Orsay in Paris, OFCE seat until 2017

OFCE was founded in 1981 following a 1979 report by René Lenoir and Baudouin Prot. It was long established in a riverfront building on 69, Quai d'Orsay in Paris, and moved in March 2017 to more modern offices at 10, place de Catalogne.

The successive Presidents of OFCE have been:

- 1981–1989: Jean-Marcel Jeanneney
- 1989–2010: Jean-Paul Fitoussi
- 2011–2013: Philippe Weil
- Since 2014: Xavier Ragot

In the early 2020s, OFCE President Xavier Ragot has been cited internationally among the top French economists.

== Merger with CEPII ==
In late 2023, a government-commissioned report by economists Jean-Luc Tavernier and Nicolas Véron recommended a merger between OFCE and CEPII, another government-funded think tank that focuses on international economics. Upon the report's publication, Prime Minister Élisabeth Borne endorsed the recommendation.

== See also ==
- German Institute for Economic Research
- Ifo Institute for Economic Research
- Dezernat Zukunft
