= Jean-Michel Charpin =

French economist (born 1949)

- Born: 23 February 1949 (age 77); Marseille, France
- Education: École polytechnique, École nationale de la statistique et de l'administration économique, Sciences Po
- Occupation: Economist
- Known for: Former director of Insee, Commissaire au Plan

Jean-Michel Charpin (born 23 February 1949) is a French economist and honorary inspector general of finance.

== Early life and education ==
Jean-Michel Charpin is an alumnus of the École polytechnique (class of 1968), the École nationale de la statistique et de l'administration économique (ENSAE), and holds a degree from the Institut d'études politiques de Paris (Sciences Po).

== Career ==
Charpin began his career in 1973 at the National Institute of Statistics and Economic Studies (INSEE) as an economist focused on medium-term projections before moving to the European Commission.

Between 1983 and 1985, he served as chief of staff to Jean Le Garrec, a government minister in the Pierre Mauroy and Laurent Fabius governments.

He was the director of the CEPII from 1985 to 1990, and also taught at École centrale Paris (1977–1982) and the École nationale d'administration (ENA; 1988–1991). Charpin later joined BNP in 1990 before becoming the Commissaire au Plan between January 1998 and January 2003. He subsequently served as Director-General of INSEE from January 2003 to October 2007.

He is vice-president and treasurer of the Paris School of Economics, and a member of the French Academy of Technologies. Charpin contributed to the French Council of Economic Analysis from 1997 to 2007 and authored the 1999 report to the Prime Minister of France on pensions, titled "L'avenir de nos retraites".

In 2004–2005, he chaired the drafting group for the Code of Good Practice for European Statistics.

== Personal life ==
Jean-Michel Charpin has four children.
