= Paul Delouvrier =

French administrator and economist (1914–1995)

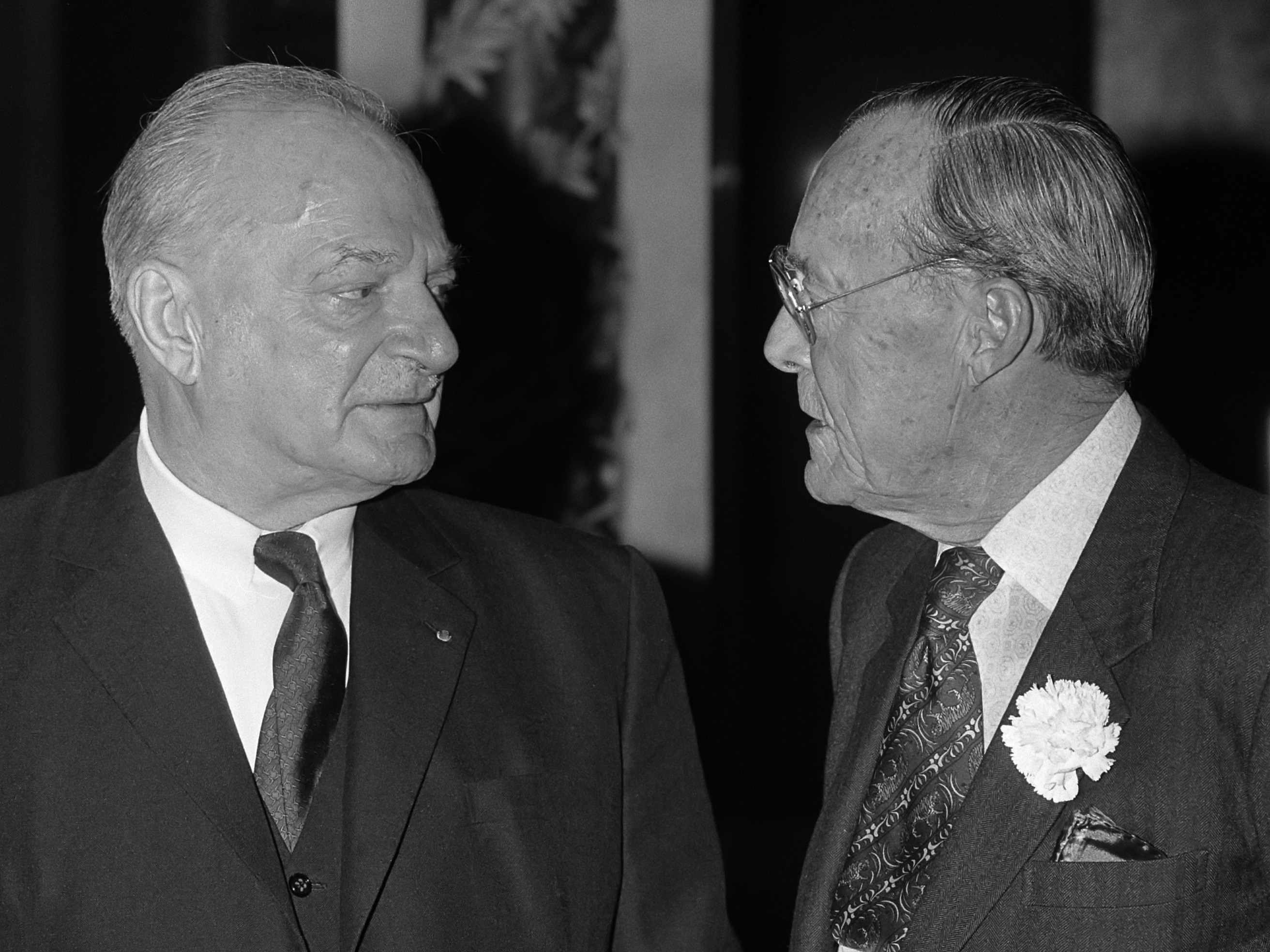
- Paul Delouvrier (l.) receiving the Erasmus Prize (1985)
- Born: 25 June 1914; Remiremont, France
- Died: 16 January 1995 (aged 80); Provins, France
- Occupations: Administrator and Economist

Paul Delouvrier (French pronunciation: [pɔl dəluvʁije]; 25 June 1914 – 16 January 1995) was a French administrator and economist. He was awarded the Erasmus Prize in 1985, a year when the theme for the award was Urban Development.

== Biography ==
Paul Delouvrier was born in Remiremont in the Vosges mountains of eastern France. He played an active role in the French Resistance and took part in the liberation of Paris in 1944.

After the war, he held various financial and economic posts and was a member of the "bright, young team" assembled by Jean Monnet to plan the postwar recovery in France and, later, economic integration in Western Europe.

Delouvrier was working in Luxembourg directing the finance division of the European Coal and Steel Community when French Prime Minister Charles De Gaulle asked him to take over from the military as his chief executive in Algeria. Serving as Governor from December 1958 to November 1960, during Algeria's War of Independence, his task was to prepare the transition to civilian rule and put in place an ambitious economic and social program for the country.

From 1961 to 1969, Delouvrier was the French Government's chief representative for the Paris region where he established the basis for the Master Plan for the area's development. He mapped out new satellite towns, and is credited with creating an efficient suburban commuter network that feeds into the Paris subway system, the Metro.

In 1969 Delouvrier became President of Electricité de France, the French state-controlled power company. From 1979, he was President of l'Etablissement public du Parc de La Villette, the culture and science park constructed on the former abattoirs in Paris.

== Honours and awards ==
The Musée Paul Delouvrier, in Évry, France

In 1985 Delouvrier was awarded the Erasmus Prize. Sometimes described as a Dutch version of the Nobel Prize, the Erasmus Prize has been awarded annually since 1958 "to a person or institution that has made an exceptional contribution to the humanities, the social sciences or the arts, in Europe and beyond."

The Paris-based Institut Paul Delouvrier was established in Delouvrier's memory. The Musée Paul Delouvrier, located in the town of Évry near Paris, was named for Delouvrier.

Business positions
| Preceded by Pierre Massé | CEO of Electricité de France; 1969-1979 | Succeeded by Marcel Boiteux |
