= French-Soviet Joint Declaration of June 30, 1966 =

Cooperation agreement between France and the Soviet Union

French-Soviet Joint Declaration of June 30, 1966 is an important agreement on a range of cooperation between the Soviet Union and France, signed in Moscow at the same date by President of the Presidium of the Supreme Soviet of the USSR Nikolai Podgorny and President of the French Republic Charles de Gaulle, which resumed with the Russian Federation since then.

== Historical and political context ==
On June 30, 1966, on a trip in Moscow of President of France Charles de Gaulle and Minister of Foreign Affairs Maurice Couve de Murville, France and the Soviet Union signed a joint declaration of cooperation on foreign affairs, science, and technology. The trip and the signing of the treaty had both a high symbolical value and dramatic implications with respect to the situation and stance of France in the Western World during the Cold War, and to the then ongoing yet still inchoate building of the European Union. The latter concerns were further emphasized by France's withdrawal from integrated NATO earlier the same year.

Chronologically, in 1959, as De Gaulle just took the power in France through a discreet coup d'état since called "May 1958 crisis in France" with the support of the military and of allies of Communist politician and former Director of the French intelligence services Jacques Soustelle, and reformed the French constitution of 1946, thus giving birth to the Fifth Republic (France), he began building up the defenses of France. On March 11 of the same year, he pulled the French Mediterranean Fleet out of NATO command.

Indeed, De Gaulle moved swiftly, as three months later only, in June 1959, he prohibited NATO nuclear weapons from being stationed in France. "His ultimate goal was two-fold. De Gaulle sought to make France independent of the United States and the United Kingdom's influence and to possess the ability to conduct autonomous negotiations with the USSR should the East Germans move into West Germany. In coming years, he removed the rest of France's Navy from the NATO command".

In November 23, 1959, in Strasbourg, De Gaulle gave a speech in which the following short sentence struck many. "Yes, it is Europe, from the Atlantic to Ural; it is Europe, the whole Europe that will decide the fate of the World!" ("Oui, c'est l'Europe, depuis l'Atlantique à l'Oural, c'est l'Europe, c'est toute l'Europe, qui décidera du destin du monde!") From that speech on, De Gaulle often repeated the same latter phrase, thus making it a motto among the French ruling elite since then.

"On Feb, 13, 1960, France became a nuclear power when it exploded a nuclear device in the Sahara Desert. What concerned the western nations in the NATO alliance was the statement of the French Chief of the General Staff. He pointed out that their nuclear weapons could fire in any direction. The obvious threat was that America could just as easily become a target. The remark was in response to the American Secretary of State Dean Rusk, when he warned France that American nuclear weapons would be pointed at France if they performed a nuclear strike beyond the agreed plans. In March 1966, De Gaulle removed all French armed forces from NATO control and told the United States (and other NATO military members) to leave France. France remained an ally to NATO forces, but only agreed to station French troops in Germany during the Cold War". The French forces in Germany remained stationed in Germany until 1993, but in the context of a French-German military cooperation agreement.

Moreover, unbeknownst to the public until April 1968, in December 1961, Soviet KGB defector to the United States Anatoliy Golitsyn had "demonstrated that NATO's headquarters in France were so deeply penetrated that all secrets of this body were deliverable to Moscow within 48 hours. The most worrying news was Golitsyn's firsthand information pointing to the existence of a KGB spy among De Gaulle's closest, most trusted advisers". In the spring of 1962, "this moved President Kennedy to take extraordinary measures to warn De Gaulle of traitors close to him — a warning that De Gaulle, always suspicious of America, refused to heed". The revelations of Golitsyn about France were as follow.

"The Ministry of the Interim, which has responsibility for internal security; the French representation in the NATO organization; the Ministry of Defense, and the Ministry of Foreign Affairs were all penetrated in the higher echelons by KGB agents. An official who then appeared to be a member of De Gaulle's cabinet, and who had ministerial or near-ministerial rank in 1944 in De Gaulle's first government, had been identified in KGB discussions as a KGB agent. A network with the code name ʻSapphire,ʼ consisting of more than half a dozen French intelligence officers, all of whom had been recruited by the KGB, was operating inside the SDECE itself. A new section for collecting scientific intelligence had been or was being created inside the SDECE, with the specific mission of spying out U.S. nuclear and other technological advances, eventually in the Soviet interest".

In 1963, SDECE's Chief of Station in Washington D.C. Philippe Thyraud de Vosjoli reported spontaneously to the CIA that his hierarchy in Paris asked to him to organize a clandestine intelligence ring in the United States, with the specific purpose to collecting information about U.S. military installations and scientific researches. What furthermore troubled Thyraud de Vosjoli is that, in their details, the objectives he was asked to spy on matched exactly a scheme that Golitsyn had revealed to his French interrogators months earlier. Additionally, the SDECE had asked to him to give the names of the sources he had in Cuba, "to cease working on Cuba altogether". On a meeting between Director of the SDECE General Paul Jacquier and Thyraud de Vosjoli at the headquarter of this agency in Paris, the former told to the latter, "Until now, ... you have been working in liaison with the Americans. That is all behind you, because we no longer consider America as our ally, our friend".

In 1966, in reaction to France's shift of stance in favor of the Soviet Union, U.S. President Lyndon B. Johnson considered he had to allow for the possibility of another reversal of situation in French politics, and said officially but cryptically, "As our old friend and ally, France's place awaits her wherever she decides to resume her leading role".

== The agreement ==
Below is a translation of the major points of the French-Soviet Joint Declaration of June 30, 1966, concerning European affairs, the Vietnam War, and the sharing of technology and scientific researches including high physics and atomic energy.

European problems drew first and foremost the attention of De Gaulle and of the Soviet statesmen. Those problems obviously are of paramount importance to France and to the Soviet Union since it is from their solving that the establishment in the whole continent of a normal situation depends on, and, consequently, of a real and stable peace. To them, the concerns are above all about the European security and the German question, on which the two parties exchanged their views.

Both governments agree that Europe's problems must be considered in a European framework, first. They believe that the States of the continent must devote their efforts to the creation of conditions necessary for the agreements to be concluded, and to the establishment of a climate of detente between all the countries in particular, in the East as in the West. Such climate would actually encourage closer relations between the latter, and the examination and settlement of the problems that arise, consequently.

To France and to the Soviet Union alike, the first objective is, in this spirit, the normalization, and then the gradual development of the relations between all European countries in the respect of the independence of each, and of non-intervention in their domestic affairs. This action must resume in all areas, be they economic, cultural, technological, and political of course.

It was noted with satisfaction on both sides that significant progresses have been made already towards the normalization of the situation in Europe. The latter effort must be pursued with the intention to paving the way for fruitful cooperation over Europe from all parties.

France and the Soviet Union have agreed that their own cooperation can constitute a decisive contribution to the latter endeavors. The two countries note with satisfaction that, in recent years, important progresses have been made, which are the results of De Gaulle's trip to Moscow and the talks he had on this occasion with the Soviet leaders. They are determined to continue in this direction, striving to rally gradually in their efforts all European countries.

The situation in Southeast Asia has been examined. The situation in the Indochinese Peninsula was found to be increasingly worrying, due to the worsening of the war in Vietnam that is multiplying suffering and chaos in this country, and is dragging the neighboring states, Cambodia and Laos, into precariousness. The French Government and the Soviet Government continue to believe that the only possible solution to such a situation, which poses a threat to the cause of peace, is a settlement based on the 1945 Geneva Agreements excluding any foreign intervention in Vietnam. In this spirit, they agree to continue exchanging their information and to confront their views. (...)

As for the French-Soviet scientific relations, it was found that contacts between French and Soviet scientists and researchers have become numerous and fruitful [sic]. Their development for the mutual benefit of the two countries will be encouraged. The conversations have shown the good results already obtained in the framework of the cooperation between France and the USSR for the pacific use of atomic energy. Plans were made on both sides to broaden the latter basis to joint work in high-energy physics in particular. "Foreign ministers signed a cooperation agreement for the study and exploration of outer space for peaceful purposes, as well as an agreement on scientific, technical, and economic cooperation. The French Government and the Soviet Government attach great importance to these two agreements, which will increase trade and develop cooperation between the two countries in science and technology, particularly in the most advanced fields.

It was decided on both sides to conclude a consular convention between France and the Soviet Union and to exchange negotiations for that purpose very soon. "In view to strengthening mutual confidence and broadening the areas of agreement and cooperation between France and the USSR, the two governments have decided to resume consultations among themselves on a regular basis.

Those consultations will focus on European problems and other international problems of common interest. The two governments will endeavor to concert their efforts in the interests of peace and security in Europe and in the World. Additionally, the consultations will relate to bilateral relations, taking into account the will of the two parties to develop friendly relations and further cooperation between France and the USSR.

In order to reinforce mutual contact at the highest level, France and the Soviet Union have decided to establish a direct line of communication between the Kremlin and the Élysée, which can be used for exchanges of views and the sending of messages whenever it appears necessary.

De Gaulle invited to visit France the official Soviet leaders with whom he had talks, Mr. L. I. Brejnev, Mr. A. N. Kossyguine, and Mr. N. V. Podgorny. The latter gratefully accepted the invitation on behalf of the Presidium of the Supreme Soviet of the USSR and the Soviet Government.

The visit of De Gaulle to the USSR and the talks to which it gave rise constitute a vital contribution to the development of the understanding between France and the Soviet Union, and between the French people and the Soviet people. Thus way, the joint efforts will contribute to a renewed feeling of confidence in the traditional role of Europe as bedrock of civilization, and in common interests in the progress of peace throughout the World.

The President of the French Republic. The President of the Praesidium of the Supreme Soviet of the USSR.

== Consequences ==
The validity of the agreement between France and the Soviet Union survived the fall of the Soviet Union, and its terms resumed with the Russian Federation since then. On June 21, 2016, France's Ambassador in Moscow Jean-Maurice Ripert gave a speech in Moscow to celebrate "the 50th anniversary of the visit of General de Gaulle in Moscow".

In particular, it gave birth from the inception to a close and uninterrupted cooperation between the two countries in aeronautics and space, and to regular exchanges of engineers and scientists for the development of a large range of technologies. In 1968, France had made operational her Guiana Space Center in Kourou, in French Guiana, South America, from which she began to launch satellites with Ariane (rocket family) rocket launchers. In 2019, the Guiana Space Center of Kourou is co-managed by the European Space Agency (ESA), the Centre National d'Études Spatiales (CNES), French rocket builder Arianespace, and Azerbaidjani satellite operator Azercosmos. In the 2000s, ESA partnered with Russian company TsSKB Progress and the Russian federal Space Agency Roscosmos, and the latter built the launch-pad Ensemble de Lancement Soyuz–ELS (Soyuz (rocket) Launch Pad) in the French Guiana Space Center of Kourou. Finished in September 2010, it is identical to the Russian launch pad of Baikonur Cosmodrome, and has been co-financed by Arianespace multinational European company and the European Union. Since 2011, Russia is launching satellites with commercial rockets Soyuz-2, imported in parts in the French Guiana Space Center of Kourou and assembled on site. Russia uses the Kourou space center to launch her own satellites. The latter cooperation justified the settlements of a number of other Russian companies in French Guiana that currently hires numerous Russians in the place.

Additionally, France and the Soviet Union developed a close partnership in intelligence activities from 1962, which resumed eventually with the Russian Federation and until today (2019) either.
