= Pierre Massé =

French economist and engineer (1898–1987)

- Born: 13 January 1898; Paris, France
- Died: 15 December 1987 (aged 89); Paris, France
- Education: École Polytechnique; École des ponts ParisTech
- Occupation: Civil servant

Pierre Benjamin Daniel Massé (French: [pjɛʁ bɛ̃ʒamɛ̃ danjɛl mase]; 13 January 1898 – 15 December 1987) was a French economist, engineer, applied mathematician, and high official in the French government.

== Education and career ==
After graduation from l'École polytechnique, Massé became an engineer at l'École nationale des ponts et chaussées and a Doctor of Science. From 1928 he worked in the electrical industry and became at Électricité de France in 1946 the director of electrical equipment and operations and in 1948 the deputy general manager. In 1957 he became president of l'Électricité de Strasbourg. In 1959 Charles de Gaulle named him Commissaire général du Plan (General Commissioner of Planning) and he held this position until 1966. Massé was chairman of the board of directors of Électricité de France from 1965 to 1969 and an associate professor of la Faculté de Droit de Paris from 1965 to 1967. He was the first president of the Fondation de France from 1969 to 1973. He was elected a member of l'Académie des sciences morales et politiques in 1977.

Pierre Massé did research in economics on the theories of economic depreciation, dynamic programming, and total factor productivity and in mathematics on Pontryagin's minimum principle. He was an invited speaker at the International Congress of Mathematicians in 1928 at Bologna.

== Selected publications ==
- Hydrodynamique fluviale, régimes variables. Hermann & Cie. 1943; 88 pages
- Les Réserves et la régulation de l'avenir dans la vie économique. Hermann & Cie. 1946; 2 volumes
- Le Choix des investissements, critères et méthodes. Dunod. 1959; 489 pages
  - Optimal Investment Decisions: Rules for Action and Criteria for Choice. Prentice-Hall. 1962; translation of Le Choix des investissements
- Le Plan, ou l'Anti-hasard (1965; 1991)
- Les Dividendes du progrès (1969)
- La Crise du développement (1973)
- Des Pas sur le sable. Pensée universelle. 1977; 63 pages
- Aléas et progrès: entre Candide et Cassandre (1984)

Business positions
Preceded by Pierre Guillaumat	CEO of EDF; 1965–1969	Succeeded by Paul Delouvrier
