= Anton Brender =

French economist

Anton Brender is a member of the Cercle des économistes.

He is also a professor at the Paris Dauphine University, and Chief Economist for the Belgian-French financial institution Candriam.

== Works ==
- Les Taux d'intérêt : approche empirique, avec F. Pisani, Economica, 1997
- Le Nouvel âge de l'économie américaine, avec F. Pisani, Economica, 1999
- Les marchés et la croissance, avec F. Pisani, Economica, 2001
- Face aux marchés, la politique, La Découverte, 2002
  - 2e édition, La France face aux marchés financiers, La Découverte, 2004
- La nouvelle économie américaine, avec F. Pisani, Economica, 2004
- La France face à la mondialisation, La Découverte, 2004
- Les déséquilibres financiers internationaux, avec F. Pisani, 2007
- Money, Finance, and the Real Economy: What Has Gone Wrong? with F. Pisani, E. Gagna, Centre for European Policy Studies, 2015
