= Devaluation (disambiguation) =

Devaluation is a reduction in the value of a currency with respect to other monetary units.

Devaluation may also refer to:

- Devaluation (psychology), the attribution of exaggerated negative qualities to self or others
- Educational devaluation, the process whereby educational degrees become less valuable over time
- Internal devaluation, an economic policy
