= Nicolas Véron =

French economist

Nicolas Véron (French pronunciation: [nikɔla veʁɔ̃]) is a French economist. He is a senior fellow at Bruegel in Brussels, which he co-founded in 2002–05, and at the Peterson Institute for International Economics in Washington DC, which he joined in 2009. In 2012, he was included in the global 50 Most Influential list of Bloomberg Markets Magazine.

== Research and career ==
Véron is an alumnus of École Polytechnique and of École nationale supérieure des mines de Paris where he received the Corps des mines training. He was a French civil servant from 1995 to 2000, first in the Prefecture in Lille then as the corporate advisor to Labor Minister Martine Aubry in the Jospin government. In 2000–02 he worked for publicly listed French Internet company MultiMania, later renamed Lycos France, as VP Business Development then Chief Financial Officer. He then cofounded Bruegel together with Jean Pisani-Ferry, starting in 2002.

His research focuses on banking and financial regulation, including in recent years, the European Banking union. He has testified before the US Senate, the European Parliament, the UK House of Lords, the Portuguese National Assembly, the Italian Parliament and the German Bundestag.

Véron became an independent board member of the derivatives arm (Global Trade Repository) of DTCC in July 2013. From 2014 to 2016 he was also a member of the scientific advisory board of AMF, France's securities regulator.

== Selected publications ==
- L'Architecture des villes, with Ricardo Bofill (Odile Jacob Publisher, 1995 – ISBN 2-7381-0304-9)
- Smoke & Mirrors, Inc.: Accounting for Capitalism, with Matthieu Autret and Alfred Galichon (Cornell University Press, 2006 – ISBN 978-0-8014-4416-6)
- The Global Accounting Experiment (Bruegel, 2007 – ISBN 978-90-78910-02-2)
- Le grand dérèglement – Chroniques du capitalisme financier (Lignes de Repères, 2009 – ISBN 978-2-915752-46-5)
- Transatlantic Economic Challenges in an Era of Growing Multipolarity, co-editor with Jacob Funk Kirkegaard and Guntram Wolff (Peterson Institute for International Economics, 2012 – ISBN 978-0-88132-645-1)
- L'Union bancaire, un succès européen (En Temps Réel, 2014 – ISBN 978-2-915897-85-2)
- Europe's Radical Banking Union (Bruegel, 2015 – ISBN 978-90-78910-37-4)
- European Banking Supervision: The First Eighteen Months, co-edited with Dirk Schoenmaker (Bruegel, 2016 – ISBN 978-90-78910-41-1)
