= André Sapir =

Belgian economist

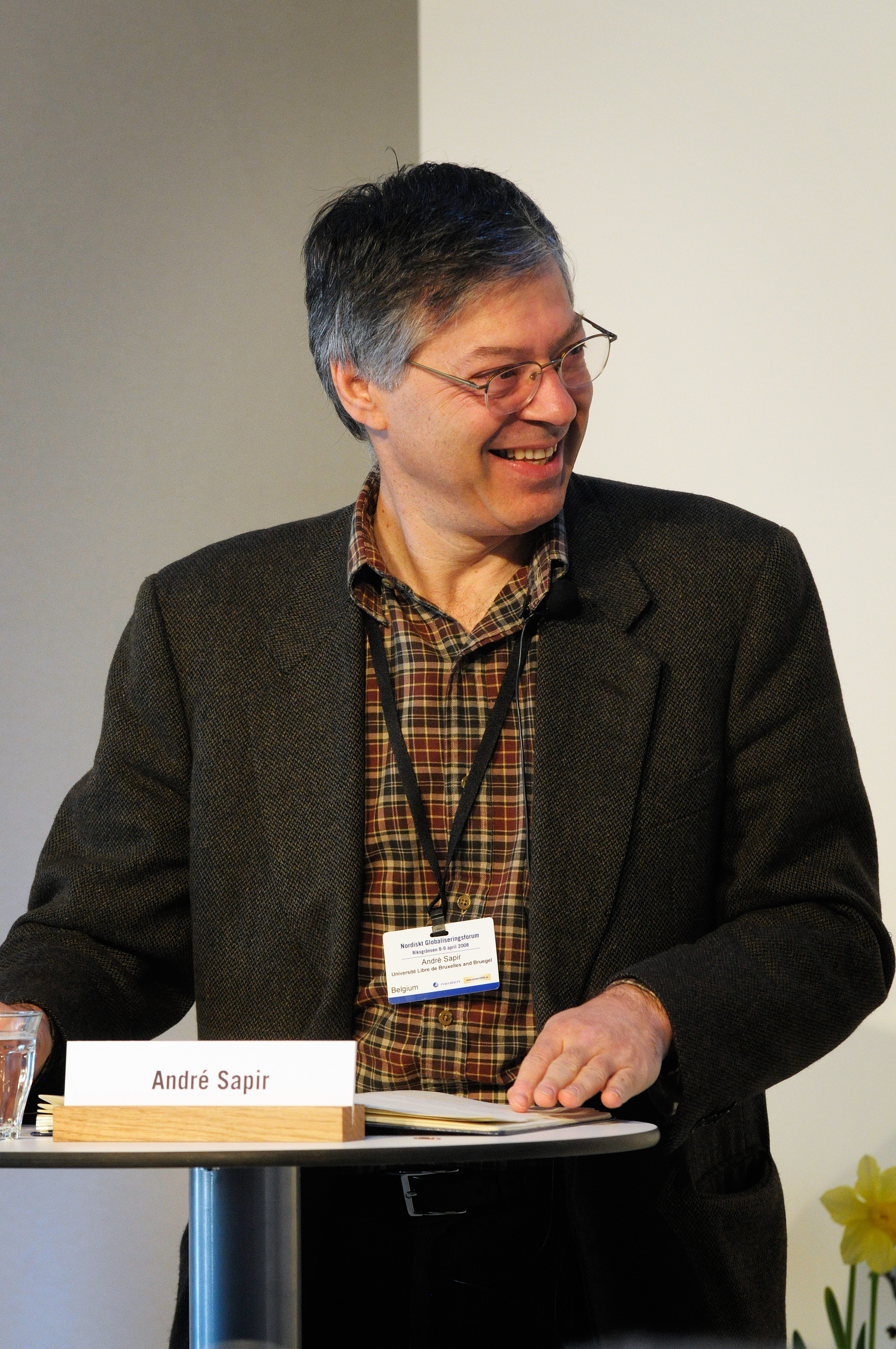

Academic background
- Education: Johns Hopkins University
- Doctoral advisor: Bela Balassa

André Sapir is a Belgian economist and professor at the Solvay Brussels School of Economics & Management (Université libre de Bruxelles). He is also a senior fellow at Bruegel, the Brussels-based think tank.

== Professional career ==
Sapir holds a PhD from Johns Hopkins University, where he studied with Bela Balassa. He then was an assistant professor of economics at the University of Wisconsin-Madison, from 1977 to 1982, before returning to his native Brussels.

From 2001 to 2004 he was economic adviser to European Commission President Romano Prodi. As such, he was the coordinator of the landmark report on Europe's growth policy known as the Sapir Report. He then served until 2009 in the group of Economic Policy Advisors to Prodi's successor José Manuel Barroso.

He is a member of the King Baudouin Foundation’s board of trustees and chairman of its selection committee for the King Baudouin International Development Prize; and of the International Scientific Advisory Councils of the Vienna Institute for Comparative Economic Studies (WIIW), of Centre d'Etudes Prospectives et d'Informations Internationales (CEPII) in Paris, and of Fundacion Ideas in Madrid. He is also a fellow at the Centre for Economic Policy Research (CEPR), and a founding editorial board member of the World Trade Review, published by Cambridge University Press and the World Trade Organization.

== Works ==
- A European Mechanism for Sovereign Debt Crisis Resolution: A Proposal, Bruegel Blueprint No. 10, Bruegel, Brussels, 2010 (with François Gianviti, Anne Krueger, Jean Pisani-Ferry and Jürgen von Hagen). ISBN 978-9-078910-18-3
- An Agenda for a Growing Europe: The Sapir Report, Oxford University Press, Oxford, 2004 (co-authored with Philippe Aghion, Giuseppe Bertola, Martin Hellwig, Jean Pisani-Ferry, Dariusz Rosati, José Viñals, Helen Wallace and Marco Buti, Mario Nava, Peter M. Smith). ISBN 978-0199271481
- Economic Policy in EMU, Oxford University Press, Oxford, 1998 (co-authored and co-edited with Marco Buti). ISBN 0-19-829477-8 (Italian translation published by Il Mulino, Bologna, 1999)

== Personal life ==
Sapir lives in Brussels. He is married to epidemiologist Debarati Guha-Sapir.
