= Karbownik =

Karbownik is a Polish surname. Notable people with the surname include:

- Andrzej Karbownik (born 1947), Polish professor of technical sciences, rector of the Silesian University of Technology
- Franciszek Karbownik (1922–2005), Polish military historian
- Jakub Karbownik (born 2001), Polish footballer
- Henryk Karbownik (1927–1999), Polish Catholic priest, lawyer, legal historian
- Michał Karbownik (born 2001), Polish footballer
- Paweł Karbownik (born 1980), Polish economist and official
