= Vogelaar =

Vogelaar is a Dutch occupational surname meaning "bird catcher". It is equivalent to the English surname Fowler. Notable people with the surname include:

- Carel de Vogelaer (1653–1695), Dutch still life painter
- Ella Vogelaar (1949–2019), Dutch politician, minister of Integration and Housing 2007–08
- Jacq Firmin Vogelaar (1944–2013), pseudonym of the Dutch writer Frans Broers
- Kate Vogelaar, Irish model

== See also ==
- Vogler and Vogeler, German forms of the surname
- Reinhilde Veugelers (born 1963), Belgian economist with a dialectical form of the name
