= Guntram Wolff =

German economist

Guntram Wolff is an economist and European public policy scholar. As of September 2024, he is professor of economics at Université Libre de Bruxelles (Solvay Brussels School/ ECARES), senior fellow at Bruegel, and senior fellow at the Kiel Institute for the World Economy. He was the director of Bruegel from 2013 to 2022, and director and CEO of the German Council on Foreign Relations from 2022 to 2024.

== Education ==
Wolff holds a PhD from the University of Bonn, studied economics in Bonn, Toulouse, Pittsburgh and Passau. He is fluent in German, English, French and has some knowledge of Bulgarian and Spanish.

== Career ==
Wolff joined Bruegel in 2011 from the European Commission, where he worked on the macroeconomics of the euro area and the reform of euro area governance. Prior to joining the commission, he was coordinating the research team on fiscal policy at Deutsche Bundesbank. He also worked as an adviser to the International Monetary Fund (IMF).

Wolff's research is focused on European governance, climate policy, geo- and defence economics and macroeconomics and has been published in academic journals such as Nature, Science, Nature Communications, Energy Policy, Climate Policy, Research Policy, Journal of European Public Policy, European Journal of Political Economy, Public Choice and Journal of Banking and Finance. He regularly testifies to the European Union Finance Ministers’ ECOFIN meeting, the European Parliament, the German Parliament (Bundestag) and the French Parliament (Assemblée Nationale). From 2012 until 2016, he was a member of the Conseil d'Analyse Économique (CAE) under successive Prime Ministers Jean-Marc Ayrault and Manuel Valls. He has also been an honorary professor at the Willy Brandt School of Public Policy at University Erfurt.

In 2013, Wolff joined the Glienicker Gruppe, a group of pro-European lawyers, economists and political scientists founded by Jakob von Weizsäcker and Maximilian Steinbeis.

In 2018, IMF Managing Director Christine Lagarde appointed Wolff to the External Advisory Group on Surveillance, a group mandated to review the Fund's operational priorities through 2025. In early 2021, he was appointed by the G20 as panel member and project director in charge of the High Level Independent Panel (HLIP) on financing the global commons for pandemic preparedness and response, co-chaired by Ngozi Okonjo-Iweala, Tharman Shanmugaratnam and Lawrence Summers.

Wolff has taught economics at the University of Pittsburgh and at Université libre de Bruxelles. His columns and policy work are published and cited in leading international media such as the Financial Times, the New York Times, Wall Street Journal, Caixin, Nikkei, El País, La Stampa, FAZ, Handelsblatt, Les Echos, BBC, ZDF, among others.

== Other activities ==
- Member, European Council on Foreign Relations ECFR
- Member, Bulgarian Council for Economic Analyses
- Member, Advisory Board of Observatory Group
- Elcano Institute advisory board member
- Círculo de Empresarios, Member of the Advisory Board

== Selected Publications ==
=== Book ===
Claeys, Grégory; Le Mouel, Marie; Tagliapietra, Simone; Wolff, Guntram; Zachmann, Georg (2024). The Macroeconomics of Decarbonisation: Implications and Policies. Cambridge University Press. ISBN 978-1009438360.

=== Journal articles (selected) ===
- Mejino-López, J., & Wolff, G. B. (2026). Europe’s dependence on US foreign military sales: evidence for policy makers from a new database. Defence and Peace Economics, 1–18. https://doi.org/10.1080/10242694.2026.2647243
- Mejino-López, J., J.Ospital, and G. B.Wolff. 2026. “Pivot to Asia, Europe or the Homeland? 18 Years of US Foreign Military Sales.” Global Policy 1–10. https://doi.org/10.1111/1758-5899.70136.
- Hilgenstock, B., Ribakova, E., Vlasyuk, A. & Wolff, G. (2025) Enforcing export controls learning from and using the financial system. Global Policy, 16, 190–199. Available from: https://doi.org/10.1111/1758-5899.13463
- Gritz, Alexandra; Wolff, Guntram (2023). "Gas and Energy Security in Germany and Central and Eastern Europe". Energy Policy. 184 113885. doi:10.1016/j.enpol.2023.113885. SSRN 4369254.
- Steinberg, Federico; Wolff, Guntram (2023). "Dealing with Europe's Economic (In-)security". Global Policy. 15 (1): 183–192. doi:10.1111/1758-5899.13303. hdl:10486/709451.
- Darvas, Zsolt; Wolff, Guntram (2022). "A green fiscal pact for the EU: increasing climate investments while consolidating budgets". Climate Policy. 23 (4): 409–417. doi:10.1080/14693062.2022.2147893.
- Oliu-Barton, Miquel; Pradelski, Bary; Woloszko, Nicolas; Guetta-Jeanrenaud, Lionel; Aghion, Philippe; Artus, Patrick; Fontanet, Arnaud; Martin, Philippe; Wolff, Guntram (2022). "The effect of Covid certificates on vaccine uptake, public health and the economy". Nature Communications. 13 3942. doi:10.1038/s41467-022-31394-1. PMC 9263819.
- Ockenfels, Axel; Tagliapietra, Simone; Wolff, Guntram (2022). "Three ways Europe could limit Russian oil and gas revenues". Nature. 604 (246): 240–241. doi:10.1038/d41586-022-01008-3.
- Oliu-Barton, M.; Pradelski, B.; Algan, Y.; Baker, M.; Binagwaho, A.; Dore, G.; El-Mohandes, A.; Fontanet, A.; Peichl, A.; Priesemann, V.; Wolff, Guntram; Yamey, G.; Lazarus, J. (2022). "Elimination versus mitigation of SARS-CoV-2 in the presence of effective vaccines". Lancet Global Health. 10 (1): E142–E147. doi:10.1016/S2214-109X(21)00494-0. PMC 8563003.
- Tagliapietra, Simone; Wolff, Guntram (2021). "Form a climate club: United States, European Union and China". Nature (591) 7851: 526–528. doi:10.1038/d41586-021-00736-2.
- Hallerberg, Mark; Marzinotto, Benedicta; Wolff, Guntram (2017). "Explaining the Evolving Role of National Parliaments Under the European Semester". Journal of European Public Policy. 25 (2): 250–267. doi:10.1080/13501763.2017.1363273.
- Iara, Anna; Wolff, Guntram (2014). "Rules and risk in the euro area". European Journal of Political Economy. 34: 222–236. doi:10.1016/j.ejpoleco.2014.02.002.)
- Von Kalckreuth, U. and Wolff, G.B. (2011), Identifying Discretionary Fiscal Policy Reactions with Real-Time Data. Journal of Money, Credit and Banking, 43: 1271-1285. https://doi.org/10.1111/j.1538-4616.2011.00425.x
- Guntram B. Wolff, Volker Reinthaler (2008), The effectiveness of subsidies revisited: Accounting for wage and employment effects in business R&D, Research Policy, Volume 37(8), 2008, Pages 1403-1412, ISSN 0048-7333, https://doi.org/10.1016/j.respol.2008.04.023.
- Hallerberg, M., Wolff, G.B (2008). Fiscal institutions, fiscal policy and sovereign risk premia in EMU. Public Choice 136, 379–396 (2008). https://doi.org/10.1007/s11127-008-9301-2
- von Hagen, Jürgen; Wolff, Guntram (2006). "What do deficits tell us about debt? Empirical evidence on creative accounting with fiscal rules in the EU". Journal of Banking and Finance. 30 (12): 3259–3279.
- Burhop, Carsten; Wolff, Guntram (2005). "A Compromise Estimate of German Net National Product 1851–1913 and its Implications for Growth and Business Cycles". Journal of Economic History. 65 (3): 613–657.
