= Uri Dadush =

French academic

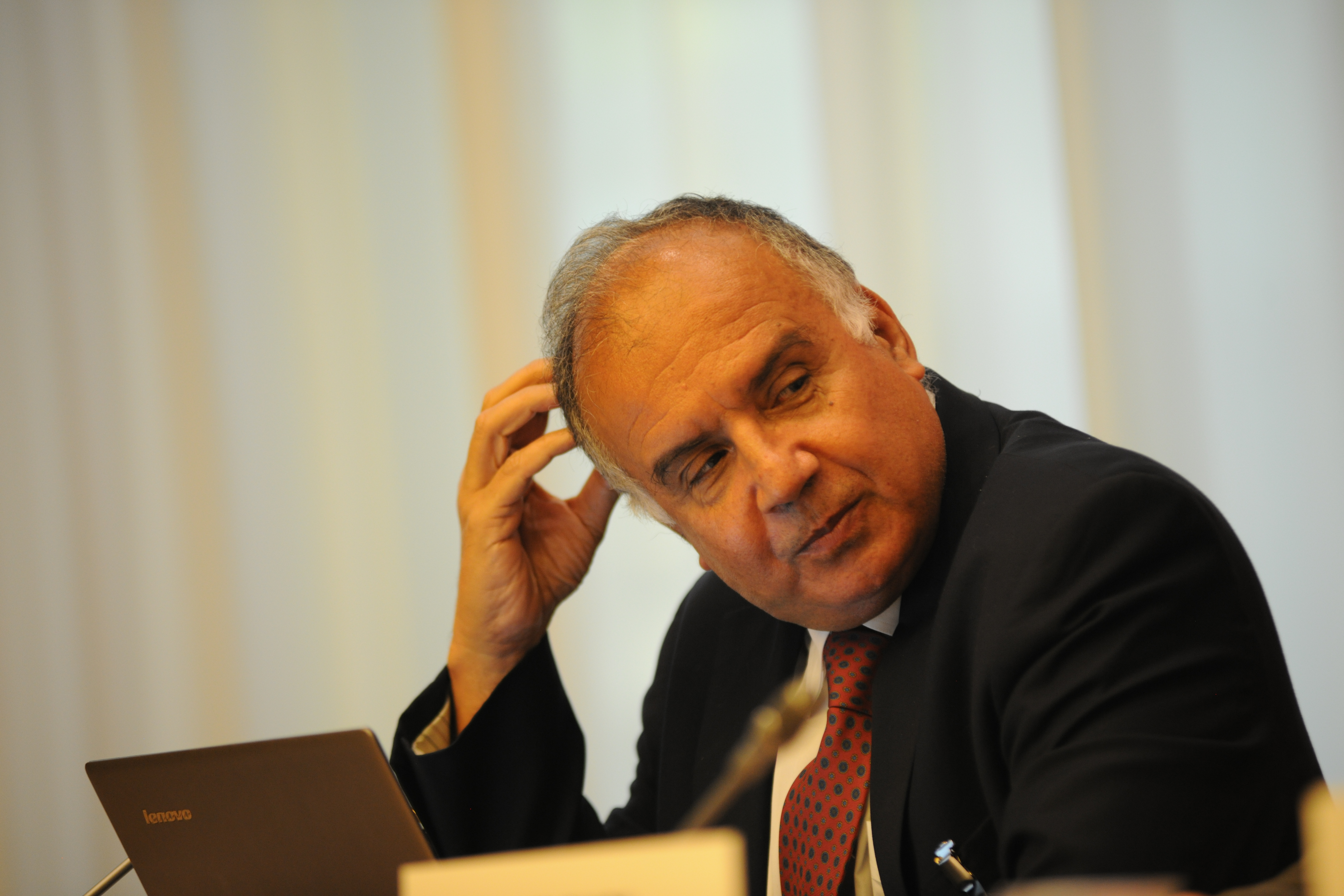
- Uri Dadush at the WTO Public Forum, 2015
- Website: economicpolicyinternational.com

Uri Dadush is a non-resident scholar at Bruegel, based in Washington, DC, and a Senior Fellow at the OCP Policy Center in Rabat, Morocco. He is also the Principal of Economic Policy International, LLC, which provides consulting services to the World Bank and other international organizations as well as corporations. He teaches courses on globalization and international trade policy at the OCP Policy School and at the School of Public Policy at the University of Maryland. Dadush works mainly on trends in the global economy and on how countries deal with the challenge of international integration through flows of trade, finance, and migration. His recent books include WTO Accessions and Trade Multilateralism (with Chiedu Osakwe, co-editor), Juggernaut: How Emerging Markets Are Transforming Globalization (with William Shaw), Inequality in America (with Kemal Dervis and others), Currency Wars (with Vera Eidelman, co-editor), and Paradigm Lost: The Euro in Crisis.

Dadush was previously Director of the International Economics Program at the Carnegie Endowment for International Peace and, at the World Bank, Director of International Trade, as well as Director of Economic Policy and Director of the Development Prospects Group. Based previously in London, Brussels, and Milan, Dadush spent 15 years in the private sector, where he was President of the Economist Intelligence Unit, Group Vice President of Data Resources, Inc., and a consultant with McKinsey and Co. His columns have appeared in leading publications such as the Financial Times, the Wall Street Journal, Foreign Affairs, and L’Espresso. He has a B.A. and M.A. in economics from the Hebrew University of Jerusalem and a Ph.D. in business economics from Harvard University.
