= Debarati Guha-Sapir =

- Born: Kolkata, India
- Education: University of Calcutta; Johns Hopkins University; Universite catholique de Louvain School of Medicine
- Spouse: Andre Sapir
- Scientific career
- Fields: Social determinants of health, Civil conflict, Natural disasters, Public health
- Workplaces: Professor in the Louvain School of Public Health and head of the Centre for Research on Epidemiology of Disasters (CRED) at Louvain School of Public Health.

Debarati Guha-Sapir (born in Kolkata, India) is an Indian epidemiologist and public health researcher based in Belgium. She is the director of the Université catholique de Louvain Centre for Research on the Epidemiology of Disasters.

== Early life and education ==
Guha-Sapir holds a BA with honors in humanities from the University of Calcutta (1974), a M.S. in epidemiology and biostatistics from Johns Hopkins University (1977) and a Ph.D. in epidemiology and preventive medicine from the Université catholique de Louvain (1991).

== Career ==
Guha-Sapir has been the director of the Centre for Research on the Epidemiology of Disasters since 1992, when founder Michel F. Lechat retired. She previously held a position as an adjunct professor at Tulane University School of Medicine. Her research interests and specialties include climate security, social determinants of health, civil conflict and natural disasters, and child mortality and health.

In addition to her academic work, Guha-Sapir was also a member of the Lancet-AUB Commission on Syria, and of the selection committee for the 2017 King Baudouin African Development Prize. Since 2019, she has been a member of the Lancet–SIGHT Commission on Peaceful Societies Through Health and Gender Equality, chaired by Tarja Halonen.

== Recognition ==
In 2009 Guha-Sapir won the Peter Safar Award for Services to Prehospital and Disaster Medicine.

- Blue Planet Prize (2023)

== Personal life ==
Guha-Sapir lives in Brussels. She is married to Belgian economist Andre Sapir.

== Selected publications ==
=== Books (Monographs) ===
1. Borde, Alexandre, Indhira Santos, and Debarati Guha-Sapir. 2013. ‘‘The Economic Impacts of Natural Disasters.’’ Oxford University Press.

=== Journal articles ===
1. Rodriguez-Llanes, Jose M., Debarati Guha-Sapir, Benjamin-Samuel Schlüter, and Madelyn Hsiao-Rei Hicks (2018). Epidemiological findings of major chemical attacks in the Syrian war are consistent with civilian targeting: a short report. ‘‘Conflict and Health’’. 12 (16).
2. van Loenhout, Joris Adriaan Frank, Tefera Darge Delbiso, Anna Kiriliouk, Jose Manuel Rodriguez-Llanes, Johan Segers, and Debarati Guha-Sapir (2018). Heat and emergency room admissions in the Netherlands. ‘‘BMC Public Health’’. 18 (108).
3. van Loenhout, Joris Adriaan Frank, Julita Gil Cuesta, Jason Echavez Abello, Debarati Guha-Sapir (2018). The impact of Typhoon Haiyan on admissions in two hospitals in Eastern Visayas, Philippines. ‘‘PLOS One’’. 13 (1).
4. Guha-Sapir, Debarati, Benjamin Schlüter, Jose Manuel Rodriguez Llanes, Louis Lillywhite, Madelyn Hsiao-Rei Hicks (2017). Patterns of civilian and child deaths due to war-related violence in Syria: a comparative analysis from the Violation Documentation Center dataset, 2011–16. ‘‘The Lancet’’. 6 (1).
5. Guha-Sapir, Debarati, Ruwan Ratnayake (2009). Consequences of Ongoing Civil Conflict in Somalia: Evidence for Public Health Responses. ‘‘PLOS One’’. 6 (8).
6. Guha-Sapir, Debarati, Willem G. Van Panhuis, Joel Lagoutte (2007). Short communication: Patterns of chronic and acute diseases after natural disasters - A study from the International Committee of the Red Cross field hospital in Banda Aceh after the 2004 Indian Ocean tsunami. ‘‘Tropical Medicine & International Health’’. 12 (11): 1338-41.
7. Guha-Sapir, Debarati and Olivier Degomme (2006). Counting the Deaths in Darfur: Estimating Mortality from Multiple Survey Data. ‘‘Households in Conflict Network’’.
