= Bruegel (think tank) =

European economic policy think tank in Brussels

- Established: 2005; 21 years ago
- Focus: European and international economic policy
- Chair: Erkki Liikanen
- Director: Jeromin Zettelmeyer
- Address: Rue Royale 54, 1000 Brussels
- Location: Brussels, Belgium
- Website: www.bruegel.org

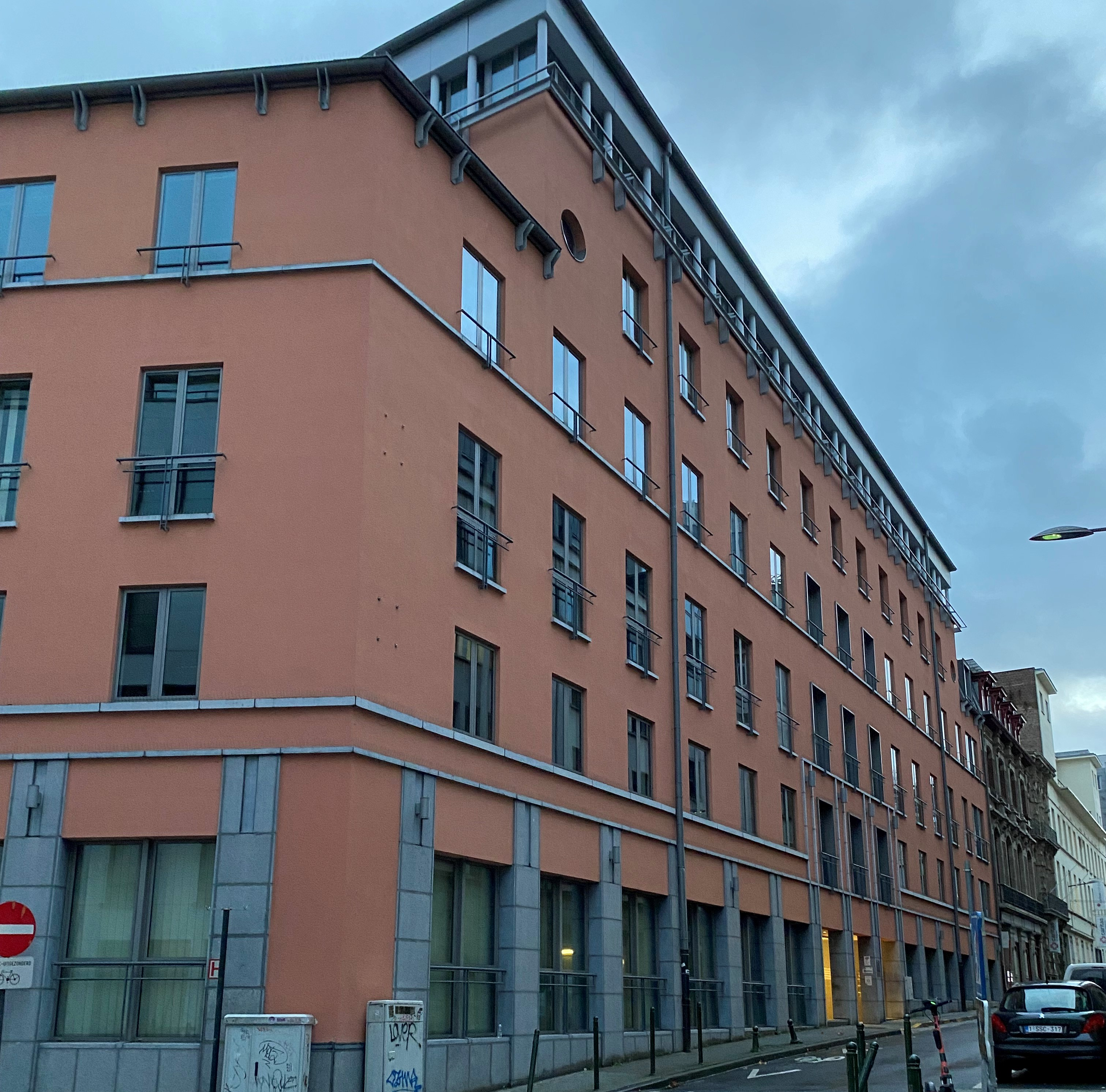
Building at rue de la Charité / Liefdadigheidstraat 33 in Brussels, where Bruegel has been located since 2005

Bruegel is a think tank devoted to policy research on economic issues. Based in Brussels, it started operations in 2005 and currently conducts research in five different focus areas with the aim of improving economic debate and policy-making.

Bruegel was recognised as the best international economics think tank worldwide (non-US) and the second best think tank worldwide (US and non-US), according to the 2020 Global Go To Think Tank Report.

It has a governance and funding model based on memberships from Member States of the European Union, international corporations, and other institutions.

== History ==
Bruegel's name is a reference to Pieter Bruegel the Elder, the 16th-century painter whose work, to Bruegel's founders, epitomised unvarnished and innovative depictions of life in Europe. It also stands for the "Brussels European and Global Economic Laboratory", even though Bruegel does not consider its name to be an acronym. The think tank was initially co-founded by the economists Jean Pisani-Ferry and Nicolas Véron in 2002. It was officially endorsed by former French President Jacques Chirac and German Chancellor Gerhard Schröder at the 40th anniversary of the Elysée Treaty in January 2003.

Former European Commissioner Mario Monti was instrumental in Bruegel's creation and became its first chairman in early 2005, following the think tank's legal creation as an International Non-Profit Association under Belgian law and its first board election in 2004.

The board was successively chaired by Mario Monti (2005–08), Leszek Balcerowicz (2008–12), Jean Claude Trichet (2012–2020) and Erkki Liikanen (2020–present). Jean Pisani-Ferry was Bruegel's director from January 2005 to April 2013 before being succeeded in his role by Guntram Wolff. Jeromin Zettelmeyer became the new director of Bruegel in September 2022.

After 21 years residing at Rue de la Charité/Liefdadigheidsstraat 33, Bruegel is moving to Rue Royale 54, 1000 Brussels. The new office opens on 30 November 2026.

== Organization ==
=== Governance ===
Bruegel is a non-profit international association under Belgian law (AISBL), governed by its statutes and its bylaws. Bruegel's highest decision making forum is the General Assembly consisting of Bruegel's members. It ratifies the board and elects six of its members directly.

The board decides on strategy, adopts the research programme and budget and appoints the director and the deputy director each for a period of three years renewable twice. Bruegel's board is elected for a three-year term by its members and consists of 11 individuals with backgrounds in government, business, academia and civil society. The board decides on Bruegel's research agenda, a process that is conducted on a yearly basis and includes in-depth consultation of all members. It also appoints the director and deputy director, and oversees Bruegel's financial management and budget. However, under Bruegel's statute and bylaws, neither the board nor the members can interfere in research results and publication decisions‚ the responsibility for which remains with the director and individual scholars.

The director and deputy director (when that latter position is activated) form the executive management of Bruegel, responsible for editorial direction, editorial oversight of publications, and control the quality of output. Together with other members of the management team, they organise board meetings, prepare the research programme and annual work plan, budget and annual report, which they then present to the board. Bruegel takes no institutional standpoint and publications reflect the views of the authors only. Bruegel's Scientific Council advises on research and provides regular academic appraisals of published papers.

=== Financing ===
Bruegel is supported by a wide array of members which contribute the bulk of its financial resources. The majority of its resources have come from state and corporate members.

As of June 2024, Bruegel's membership consisted of three categories. State members are Member States of the European Union, which join on a voluntary basis, including Austria, Belgium, Cyprus, Denmark, Finland, France, Germany, Hungary, Ireland, Italy, Luxembourg, Malta, Poland, Slovakia, Spain, Sweden and The Netherlands. The United Kingdom also holds membership. Corporate members are international corporations and firms, many of which are headquartered in the European Union. Institutional members include national and international public financial institutions as well as central banks.

=== Leadership ===
- Chair of the Board: Mario Monti (2005–2008), Leszek Balcerowicz (2008–2012), Jean-Claude Trichet (2012–2021), Erkki Liikanen (since 2021)
- Director: Jean Pisani-Ferry (2005–2013), Guntram Wolff (2013–2022), Jeromin Zettelmeyer (since 2022)
- Deputy Director: Guntram Wolff (2011–2013), Maria Demertzis (2016–2022)

Board membership as of June 2024: Erkki Liikanen (chair), Riccardo Barbieri Hermitte, Agnès Bénassy-Quéré, Markus Brunnermeier, Paula Conthe, Alexandra Dimitrijevic, Caroline de Gruyter, Monika Marcinkowska, Isabelle Mateos y Lago, Simone Mori, and Tom Scholar.

== Operations ==
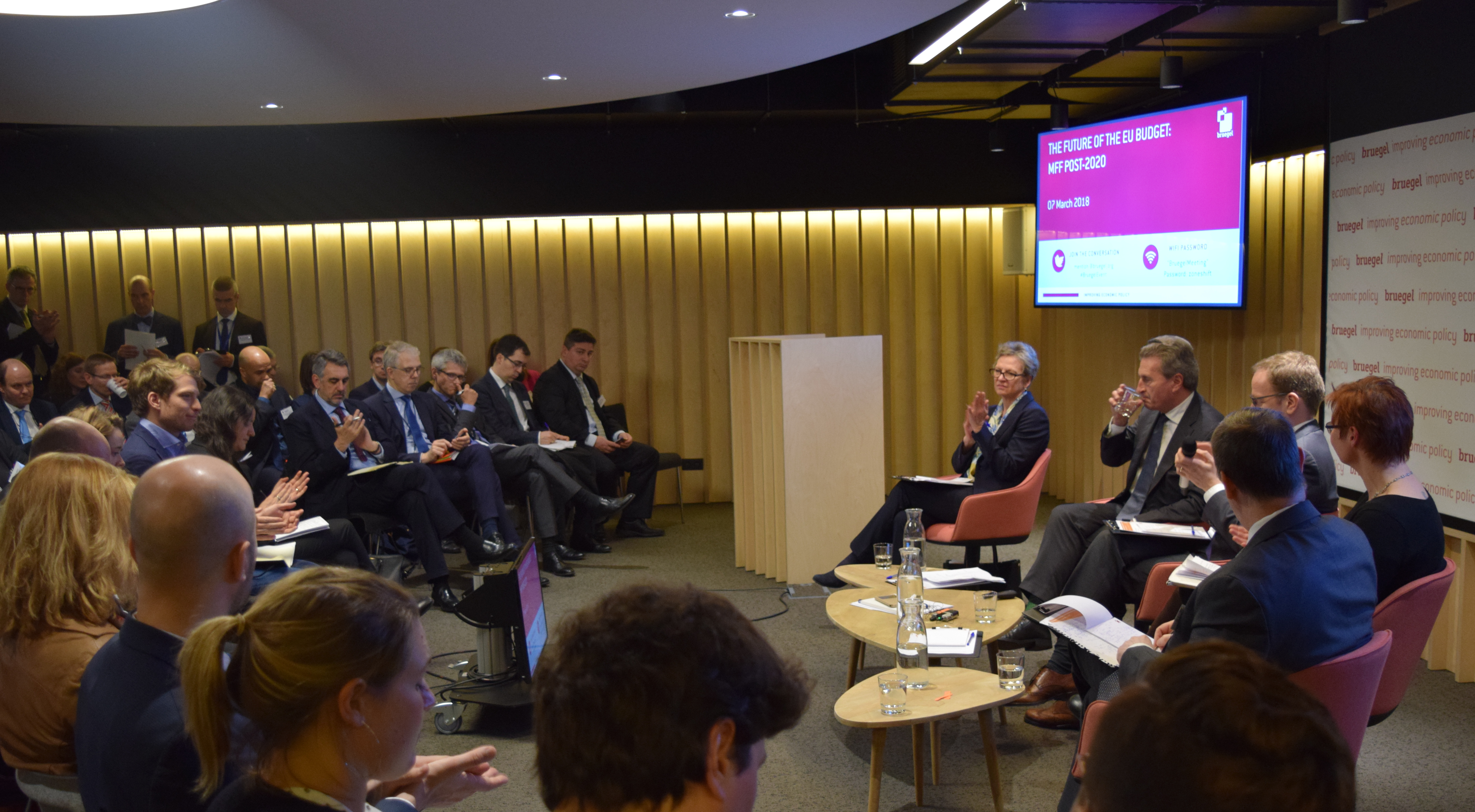
Lunch time seminar at Bruegel

Bruegel's research team is composed of senior fellows, non-resident fellows, research fellows and affiliate fellows as well as a team or research assistants.

Bruegel's professional staff is responsible for the organisation's outreach, developing stakeholder relationships and ensuring smooth day-to-day operations.

=== Research programme ===
Bruegel's research is divided into five broad research areas: Banking and capital markets, Digital economy, labour markets, skills and health, Global economy and trade policy, Energy and climate policy, and Macroeconomic policy and governance. The research programme is reviewed every three years while the research priorities are developed on a yearly basis in the autumn by the board after discussions with Bruegel scholars, members and other stakeholders.

=== Publications ===
Bruegel's scholars regularly publish their research on Bruegel's website. In 2023, the lively Bruegel blog format was retired, and it was upgraded to become the new Analysis section. Bruegel also releases more in-depth research in the form of policy briefs, working papers, essays and blueprints. Bruegel fellows have presented research testimonies at the European Parliament, the US Congress and various national parliaments. Bruegel also introduced a new First Glance section, where researchers can write real-time insights into emerging economic issues.

=== Events ===
Bruegel also hosts events which gather experts, the public and various stakeholders for in-depth discussion on a range of policy issues. The events are often livestreamed with the video and audio recordings on Bruegel's website. In 2023, Bruegel hosted 81 events throughout the year and released 53 episodes of the podcast "The Sound of Economics", which amassed 181,910 listens across all platforms. This is in addition to publishing 56 Long reads (2 books, 1 essay, 21 working papers, 22 policy briefs, 10 reports for the European Parliament), 86 Short reads (36 Analyses, 8 Blog posts, 42 First glances) and 15 Datasets.

Bruegel Annual Meetings (BAM) has been Bruegel's flagship event, held in venues in and around Brussels over the years: Bibliothèque Solvay and Château Sainte-Anne (2006), Atomium (2007), Hilton Hotel and Egmont Palace (2008), Théâtre royal des Galeries (2009), Bibliothèque Solvay (2010), Egmont Palace (2011), The Hotel Brussels (2012), Stanhope Hotel (2013), The Hotel (2014), Les Brigittines (2015), Autoworld (2016), Square Convention Centre (2017), Belgian Comic Strip Center (2018), Academy Palace (2019), virtual (2020), Academy Palace (2021, 2022), Centre for Fine Arts (2023), Academy Palace & Centre for Fine Arts (2024), Royal Museums of Fine Arts (2025).

=== Notable scholars ===
As of April 2025, Bruegel's director was Jeromin Zettelmeyer leading a team of 55 fellows, including:

- Suman Bery, non-resident fellow (on leave for public service)
- Marco Buti, non-resident fellow
- Uri Dadush, non-resident fellow
- Ignacio Garcia Bercero, non-resident fellow
- Alicia García-Herrero, senior fellow
- Heather Grabbe, senior fellow
- Pablo Hernández de Cos, non-resident fellow
- Paweł Karbownik, non-resident fellow (on leave for public service)
- Annamaria Lusardi, non-resident fellow
- Dalia Marin, non-resident fellow
- Jonathan D. Ostry, non-resident fellow
- Jean Pisani-Ferry, senior fellow (director 2005–2013)
- Lucrezia Reichlin, non-resident fellow
- Elina Ribakova, non-resident fellow
- Pascal Saint-Amans, non-resident fellow
- André Sapir, senior fellow
- Fiona Scott Morton, senior fellow
- Armin Steinbach, non-resident fellow
- Nicolas Véron, senior fellow
- Reinhilde Veugelers, senior fellow
- Stefanie Walter, non-resident fellow
- Guntram Wolff, senior fellow (director 2013–2022)

== Scientific review and evaluation ==
Bruegel's scientific council provide feedback on the scientific rigour of Bruegel's work. It has been successively chaired by Paul Seabright (2005–2009), Giuseppe Bertola (2009–13), Lucrezia Reichlin (2013–2017), Svend Erik Hougaard Jensen (2017–2020), Arnoud Boot (2020–2024), and Elena Carletti (since 2024).

Bruegel regularly asks an ad hoc task force to review the impact and relevance of its work. The successive review task forces have been (co-)chaired by Paweł Samecki (2007), Ieke van den Burg (2010), Esko Aho (2013), Katarzyna Śledziewska (2016), Hans Eichel (2019), Peter Praet and Elsa Fornero (2022). The reports have been posted online by Bruegel, including scientific assessment by Bruegel's scientific council.

== Awards and recognition ==
In 2012, the University of Pennsylvania ranked Bruegel 8th out of 600 different think tanks in a report called "The Global Go To Think Tanks Rankings and associated trends report"

Transparify has repeatedly awarded Bruegel five stars out of five for transparency, including in 2018. Prospect Magazine Awarded Bruegel the European Economic Think Tank of the Year in 2015, 2016, 2017 and 2019.

The 2020 Global Go To Think Tank Index Report, published by the University of Pennsylvania, ranked Bruegel as:

- #1 Top Think Tanks in Western Europe
- #1 Top International Economics Policy Think Tanks
- #2 Top Think Tanks Worldwide (US and Non-US)
- #2 Think Tanks with Outstanding Policy-Oriented Research Programs
- #2 Best Quality Assurance and Integrity Policies and Procedures
- #2 Best Institutional Collaboration Involving Two or More Think Tanks
- #4 Think Tanks with the Most Significant Impact on Public Policy
- #5 Best Managed Think Tanks
- #5 Think Tanks with the Best Use of the Internet
- #5 Best Use of Media (Print or Electronic)
