= Centre for Research on the Epidemiology of Disasters =

Research center at the University of Louvain

The Centre for Research on the Epidemiology of Disasters (CRED) is a research unit of the University of Louvain (UCLouvain). It is part of the School of Public Health located on the UCLouvain Brussels Woluwe campus, in Brussels, Belgium.

CRED has been active for over thirty years in the fields of international disaster and conflict health studies, with research and training activities linking relief, rehabilitation and development. It promotes research, training and technical expertise on humanitarian emergencies, with a special focus on public health and epidemiology.

== History ==
In 1971, Professor Michel F. Lechat, an epidemiologist at UCLouvain, initiated a research programme to study health issues in disaster situations. Two years later he established CRED as a non-profit institution with international status. Since 1980, CRED has been a World Health Organization (WHO) Collaborating Centre.

Following the retirement of Professor Lechat in 1992, Professor Debarati Guha-Sapir—a researcher in the programme since 1984—became CRED's director.

== Activities ==
CRED's multinational and multidisciplinary team includes experts in medicine and public health, informatics and database management, psychology, nutritional sciences, sociology, economics and geography. The working languages are English and French.

CRED's research focuses on humanitarian and emergency situations with major impacts on human health. These include all types of natural disasters such as earthquakes, floods, windstorms, famines and droughts; and human induced disasters creating mass displacement of people from civil strife and conflicts.

CRED focuses on health aspects and the burden of disease arising from disasters and complex emergencies. CRED also promotes research on the broader aspects of humanitarian crises, such as human rights and humanitarian law, socio-economic and environmental issues, early warning systems, mental health care, and the special needs of women and children. Additionally CRED trains field managers, students, relief personnel and health professionals in the management of short- and long-term humanitarian emergencies.

CRED is actively involved in stimulating debates on the effectiveness of various humanitarian interventions. It encourages scientific and policy discussions on existing and potential interventions and their impacts on acute and chronic malnutrition, human survival, morbidity, infectious diseases, and mental health.

The CRED team works in four main areas:

- Natural disasters & their impacts
- Conflict & health research
- Database & information support
- Capacity building & training

== EM-DAT ==
The centre maintains the Emergency Disaster Database (EM-DAT), a repository of information on mass disasters that have happened since 1900. As of 2026 it contained records on over 27,000 disasters. About 2/3 of the disasters are classified as natural, e.g. storms or earthquakes, while the rest are technological, e.g. industrial disasters. EM-DAT is freely available for non-commercial use, searchable by disaster type, country of origin, and source of information. The NASA global dataset of geocoded disaster locations, GDIS, relies on EM-DAT data.

The database was founded in 1988 as a joint project between CRED and the World Health Organization. Data is sourced from UN agencies, non-governmental organizations, insurance companies, academic sources, and press agencies. As of 2024 it receives primary funding from the US Agency for International Development (USAID). In 2025, the Trump administration ended funding for 83% of USAID projects including funding for EM-DAT. In March 2026, an open letter was published calling for alternative funding streams to ensure the future of the database, which was signed by 4,000 academics.
