= Arnoud Boot =

Dutch economist

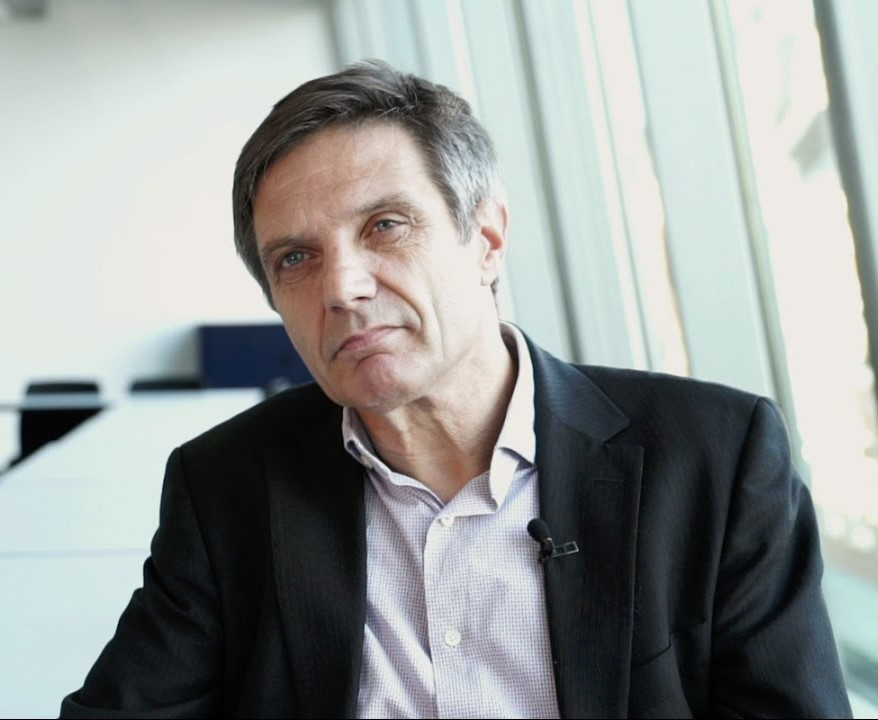
Prof. Arnoud W.A. Boot

Arnoud W.A. Boot (born January 2, 1960 – Huizen, Netherlands) is a Dutch economist and professor of Corporate Finance and Financial Markets at the University of Amsterdam. He is a member of the Royal Netherlands Academy of Arts and Sciences since 2008 and its Social-Scientific Council.

He serves as research fellow at the Center for Economic Policy Research (CEPR) in London and as member of the Financial Economists Roundtable.

== Academic work ==
His research focuses on corporate finance and financial institutions and covers a wide range of related issues including corporate governance, issues related to the regulation and structure of financial institutions, security design and capital structure. Special focus in his research goes out to relationship banking.

He has written various books, among them the textbook Contemporary Financial Intermediation, 2019; Handbook of Financial Intermediation and Banking, 2008; Financiering en macht: van financiële structuur tot beheersstructuur (Finance and Power), 1997, and De ontwortelde onderneming: Ondernemingen overgeleverd aan financiers? (The Footloose Corporation), 2009.

== Other positions present, past ==
Arnoud Boot started his career as a faculty member at the Kellogg Graduate School of Management at Northwestern University in the USA. In 2000-2001 he was a partner in the Finance and Strategy Practice at McKinsey & Company.

During 2011-2015 he was a member of the Inaugural Scientific Advisory Committee of the European Systemic Risk Board (ESRB). He was chairman of the Scientific Council at Bruegel, Brussels (2020-2024). He chaired the European Finance Association (EFA), (2016-2023) and was president of the Financial Intermediation Research Society (FIRS), (2012–2014).

He was a crown member (Kroonlid) of the Dutch Social Economic Council (SER), Chairman of the Royal Netherlands Economics Association and Chair of the Bank Council of the Dutch Central Bank (DNB). From 2013 through 2023 he was a council member of the Dutch Scientific Council for Government Policy (WRR). He is a member and former chair of Sustainable Finance Lab (SFL), an Utrecht-based initiative that stands for the financial and environmental sustainability.

During 2014 he chaired a Dutch government committee that designed the new high school curriculum for business economics (M&O).

== Recognition ==
In 1998 he was awarded the Limperg Penning in recognition of contributions to business administration, and in 2011 the Pierson Penning, a once in three year recognition for contributions to economics. In 2010 he was featured in the HUMAN TV documentary De magie van de wetenschap. Arnoud Boot is since 2014 an honorary member of the Royal Netherlands Economic Association (KVS).
