= Alicia García-Herrero =

Spanish economist and academic

Alicia Garcia Herrero
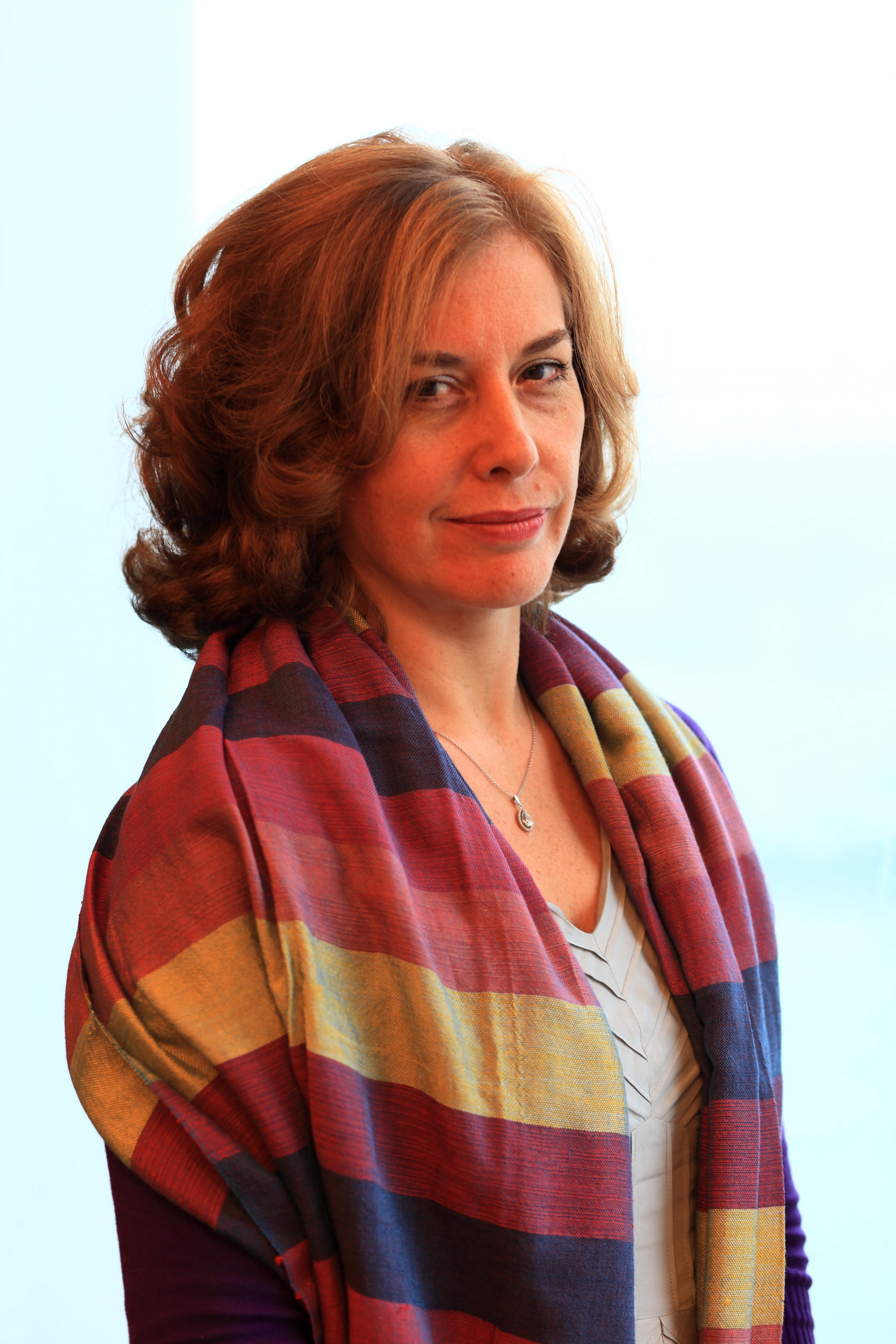

Personal details
- Occupation: Economist and academic

Alicia Garcia Herrero is a Spanish economist and academic based in Hong Kong. She has been the chief economist for Asia-Pacific at French investment bank Natixis and adjunct Professor at Hong Kong University of Science and Technology (HKUST) and Sunyatsen University and she joined insurance company AGEAS as an independent board member.

== Education ==
García-Herrero holds a PhD in Economics from George Washington University. She has also conducted graduate studies in International Economics at Kiel Institute of World Economics and also holds two undergraduate degrees, one in economics from Bocconi University and another in business administration from the University of Burgos.

== Career ==
García-Herrero has worked in BBVA as the chief economist for emerging markets focusing on European and Asian economic and financial issues. Prior to this she was a member of the Asian Research Program of the Bank for International Settlements, Alicia has also been a member of the Council of the European Central Bank Executive Board and has held positions at the International Monetary Fund and at the Bank of Spain.

García-Herrero was a visiting faculty member of CEIBS (China), visiting professor at Johns Hopkins University (Italy), adjunct professor at Lingnan University (Hong Kong), assistant professor at Universidad Carlos III (Spain), and associate professor at Universidad Autonoma de Madrid (Spain).

She has worked as a senior fellow at Brussels-based Think Tank, Bruegel since 2015 and as a non-resident senior fellow at the East Asia Institute of the National University of Singapore (NUS) since 2020. She is also a member of the advisory board of Madrid-based Real Instituto Elcano, Berlin-based think tank on China, MERICS.

Herroro has published many articles in academic journals books and Bloomberg, CNBC, CNN, Reuters, etc. She has also written a wealth of Op-Eds for the Financial Times, Nikkei Asia Review, Project Syndicate, Forbes, The Korea Herald, EL PAIS, Les Echos, Milano Finanza, South China Morning Post, Common Wealth Magazine etc.

== Publications ==
- "How Does China Conduct Industrial Policy: Analyzing Words Versus Deeds". Journal of Industry, Competition and Trade 24, 10, 27-04-2024.
- "Promotion of high-capacity broadband in the face of increasing global stress", Telecommunications Policy, 22-11-2023.
- "Will the Belt and Road Initiative Be Another Casualty of the Pandemic?", Georgetown Journal of International Affairs, 11-11-2022.
- "China’s State-Owned Enterprises and Competitive Neutrality", HKUST IEMS Thought Leadership Briefs, no. 54, 2021.
- "Europe in the Midst of China-US Strategic Economic Competition: What Are the European Union’s Options?", Journal of Chinese Economic and Business Studies, Vo.17 (4), 2019.
- "How Does China Fare on the Russian Market? Implications for the European Union", Russian Journal of Economics, Vol.5 (4), 2019
- "The Regulatory Arbitrage and Window Dressing in Shadow Banking: The Example of Chinese Wealth Management Product", Economics and Political Studies, Vol.7 (3), 2019.
- "Mexico’s Monetary Policy Communication and Money Markets", International Journal of Economics and Finance, Vol. 11, No. 2, 10-01-2019.
- "Analyzing the Impact of Monetary Policy on Financial Markets in Chile", Economic Analysis Review, Vol. 32 No. 1, 08-11-2017.
- "Financial inclusion, rather than size, is the key to tackling income inequality" , The Singapore Economic Review. 63 (1): 167–184, 08-11-2017.
- "China's Belt and Road Initiative: Can Europe Expect Trade Gains?" , China & World Economy. 25 (6): 84–99, 2017.
- "The mix of international banks' foreign claims: Determinants and implications" , Journal of Banking & Finance. 31 (6): 1613–1631, 2017.
- "Do as I Do, and Also as I Say: Monetary Policy Impact on Brazil's Financial Markets". Economía. 17 (2): 65–92, 10-05-2017.
- "Do Asian investors rebalance their portfolios and what are the consequences?", Journal of Asian Economics. 18: 195–216, 2017.
- "Does China have an impact on foreign direct investment to Latin America?" , China Economic Review. 18 (3): 266–286, 2017.
