= Federico Steinberg =

- Born: Federico Steinberg; 1976 (age 49–50); Buenos Aires (Argentina)
- Occupation: senior analyst

Federico Steinberg Wechsler (born 1976, Buenos Aires, Argentina) is a Spanish academic and policy specialist in International Political Economy, serving as a senior analyst at Real Instituto Elcano.

== Trajectory ==
He obtained a bachelor's degree in Economics (1999) and a Ph.D. in economics (2005) with an Extraordinary Award from the Autonomous University of Madrid (UAM). He holds an MSc in international political economy from the London School of Economics (LSE) and a master's in international affairs from Columbia University. His doctoral courses were completed at Georgetown University under a UAM exchange scholarship.

His prior professional experience includes consulting work for the World Bank, work at the Executive Office of the secretary-general of the United Nations in New York, and work at the LSE's Trade Policy Unit. He has also served as an expert witness in a sovereign debt restructuring lawsuit.

Steinberg is a full professor in the Department of Economic Analysis at the Autonomous University of Madrid. He is a senior fellow and principal investigator at the Elcano Royal Institute. He served as special adviser to Josep Borrell, the high representative for foreign and security policy and vice-president of the European Commission, from 2019 to 2024. He served as a member of the advisory council for the second vice president of the Government of Spain and minister of economic affairs and digital transformation, Nadia Calviño. In January 2025, he began his term as the Prince of Asturias Distinguished Visiting Professor at Georgetown University.

== Research ==
His research focuses on international trade, European monetary union, and the governance of globalization. He has published dozens of articles in indexed journals, including the Journal of Common Market Studies, Review of International Political Economy, and New Political Economy. He is the author of two books, several book chapters, and eight books as editor. He has participated in international research networks, including COST A26 and the VII EU Framework Programme. Since 2007, he has directed the international economics research program at the Elcano Royal Institute. He writes a monthly column in the economic newspaper Expansión and has provided testimony as an independent expert to the UK House of Lords (2013).
