= Paweł Karbownik =

Polish public figure

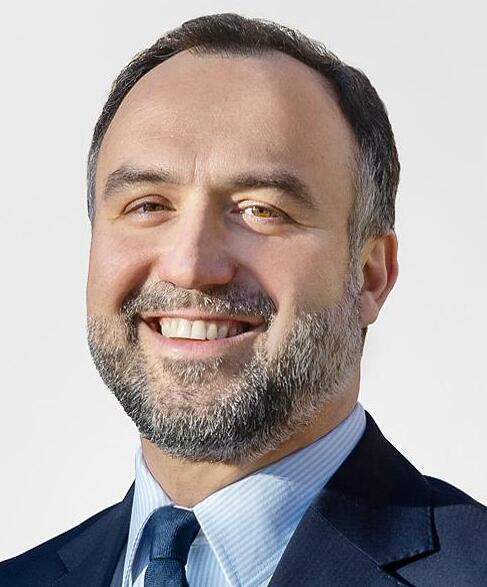
Paweł Karbownik, photographed in 2025

Paweł Konrad Karbownik (born 1980 in Opoczno) is a Polish economist and official who served as Deputy Finance Minister of Poland from December 2023 to June 2025.

== Biography ==
Karbownik graduated in Finance and Banking from SGH Warsaw School of Economics. His early career included stints in Warsaw at McKinsey & Company, the Chancellery of the Prime Minister of Poland, and Procter & Gamble. From 2004 to 2009, he was the head of office for Dariusz Rosati at the European Parliament and specifically its Committee on Economic and Monetary Affairs.

In 2009, Karbownik returned to Poland and worked for a while at the Office of the Polish Committee for European Integration which was subsequently integrated into the Ministry of Foreign Affairs. By 2012, he was Deputy Director in that ministry's European Union Economic Department, responsible for programming Poland's presidency of the Council of the European Union in the second half of 2011 and also for implementing sanctions against Russia in 2014.

From 2014 to 2019, Karbownik was back in Brussels as advisor to Donald Tusk as President of the European Council, working on G7 and G20 matters as well as the EU strategic agenda. In 2022-2023 he was a fellow at Brussels-based think tank Bruegel.

On 13 December 2023 Tusk, by then Prime Minister of Poland, appointed Karbownik as Deputy Minister at the Ministry of Finance under Andrzej Domański. Karbownik remained in that position until his resignation for family motives in June 2025. During that period, he was Poland's member of the Economic and Financial Committee and Deputy Governor at the World Bank and the European Bank for Reconstruction and Development, and led policy discussion during Poland's presidency of the Council of the European Union in the first half of 2025.

== Honors ==
In 2014, Karbownik was awarded the Silver Cross of Merit.
