= Reinhilde Veugelers =

Belgian economist

- Born: 1963 (age 62–63); Hasselt
- Education: Katholieke Universiteit Leuven
- Occupation: Economist

Reinhilde Veugelers (born 1963 in Hasselt) is a Belgian economist and Professor of Managerial Economics, Strategy and Innovation at the Katholieke Universiteit Leuven from Belgium, known for her research on science and innovation. She is also a scholar at Bruegel in Brussels and at the Peterson Institute for International Economics in Washington D.C.

== Biography ==
Born in Hasselt, Veugelers received her PhD in Economics from the Katholieke Universiteit Leuven on the thesis entitled "Scope Decisions of Multinational Enterprises". She is a full professor at the Katholieke Universiteit Leuven, the Faculty of Business and Economics, the Management, Strategy and Innovation (MSI) Department.

She has been a visiting scholar at the Kellogg School of Management, MIT Sloan School of Management, New York University Stern School of Business, ECARES/Université libre de Bruxelles, Pantheon-Sorbonne University, Pompeu Fabra University & Autonomous University of Barcelona, and Maastricht University.

From 2004 to 2008 she was on academic leave, as an advisor at the Bureau of European Policy Advisers. Since 2009, she is a senior fellow at Bruegel. Furthermore, she is a CEPR (Center for Economic Policy Research, London) research fellow. She also is a "co-promotor" for the Flemish Government "Steunpunt" on R&D Statistics. She currently serves on the European Research Council (ERC) Scientific Council. She is a member of the Royal Flemish Academy of Belgium for Sciences and of the Academia Europeana.

Other advisory positions include membership of:

- High Level Group on Innovation for Growth advising the European Commissioner for Research and Innovation (2006–present).
- Flemish Advisory Council for Innovation & Enterprise (VARIO), advising the Flemish Minister of Innovation (2016–present).
- Austrian ERA Council advising the vice chancellor (2014–present).
- French Conseil d'Analyse Économique, chaired by Agnès Bénassy-Quéré, Services du Premier Ministre (2016–present).
- French Commission nationale d'évaluation des politiques d’innovation, chaired by Jean Pisani-Ferry, Commissioner-general of France Stratégie (2014–present).

== Research ==
With her research concentrated in the fields of industrial organisation, international economics and strategy, innovation and science, she has authored numerous well cited publications in leading international journals. Specific recent topics include cooperative R&D, international technology transfers through MNEs, global innovation value chains, young innovative companies, innovation for climate change, industry science links and their impact on firm’s innovative productivity, evaluation of research & innovation policy, explaining scientific productivity, researchers’ international mobility.

== Selected publications ==
=== Some most cited articles ===
- Cassiman, B. & R. Veugelers, 2006, In Search of Complementarity in Innovation Strategy: Internal R&D, Cooperation in R&D and External Technology Acquisition, Management Science, 52, 1, 68-82.
- Debackere, K. and R. Veugelers, 2005, Improving Industry Science Links through University Technology Transfer Units: an analysis and a case, Research Policy, 34,3, 321-342.
- Cassiman, B. & R. Veugelers, 2002, R&D Cooperation and Spillovers: some empirical evidence from Belgium, American Economic Review, 92, 4, 1169-1184.

=== Some most recent articles ===
- Wang, J, Veugelers, R., Stephan, P. 2015, Bias against novelty in science: a cautionary tale for users of bibliometric indicators, NBER working paper 22180; CEPR working paper 11228.
- Verhoeven, D., J. Bakker & R. Veugelers, 2016, Measuring technological novelty with patent-based indicators, Research Policy, 45, 3, 707-723.
- Schneider, C. & R. Veugelers, 2010, On Young Highly Innovative Companies: why they matter and how (not) to policy support them, Industry and Corporate Change, 19, 4, 969-1007.

=== Some policy publications ===
- Veugelers, R. 2012, Innovation in EU merger control: walking the talk, Bruegel Policy Contribution 2012/708, Bruegel, Brussels.
- Veugelers, R. and M. Cincera, 2010, Europe’s Missing Yollies, Bruegel Policy Brief 2010/06, Bruegel Brussels.
- Aghion, Ph, D. Hemous and R. Veugelers, 2009, No green growth without Innovation, Bruegel Policy Brief, 2009/07, Bruegel Brussels.
