= Internal devaluation =

Economic and social policy option

Internal devaluation is an economic and social policy option whose aim is to restore the international competitiveness of some country mainly by reducing its labour costs – either wages or the indirect costs of employers. Sometimes internal devaluation is considered as alternative to 'standard' external devaluation when nominal exchange rates are fixed, although social implications and speed of economic recovery can significantly differ between the two options. While proponents usually blame fiscal profligacy or loss of competitiveness as the reason for a need to devalue internally, critics oftentimes view macroeconomic imbalances and the absence of a fiscal transfer mechanism within a currency union as culprits.

Internal devaluation was first considered during the Sweden financial crisis 1990-1994 and after Finland's accession to the European Union in 1995. Internal devaluation gained popularity during the economic recession of 2008–2010 when several countries pursued such policies with aim to restore competitiveness and to balance national budgets.

Latvia is often named as successful case of internal devaluation by popular media, although its poor performance in the international development indices (e.g. Global competitiveness indices, European Union Innovation Scoreboard, the rating levels had not changed in the following year as well) as well as severe emigration have been claimed to prove the negative impact of internal devaluation on the development of the human resources and potential GDP (whose performance can be measured by the notable inflation rate).

== Academic research ==
While internal devaluation has been discussed in newspapers and has been put into work as a policy already for some years in the several countries, peer-reviewed research on the topic is sparse and has started to appear only recently. Much of it is restricted to qualitative observations (e.g. ScienceDirect database list more than 3 times more articles for such emerging discipline as geo-engineering (human control of global climate) than for internal devaluation). merely mentions some well known news items about the internal devaluation. recognizes that "the most efficient way to reduce the cost of labour is to run high levels of unemployment". But apparently, that can be acceptable only in the countries where the gray economy is tolerated.

In fact, there is research about the labour market policies that has been implemented during the internal devaluation and the researcher concluded "I will argue that the seemingly flexible reaction of the ... labour market to the crisis is to a large extent due to weak law enforcement". acknowledges (without quantitative estimations) that the policy of internal devaluation is "painful and slow". Currently is the most exhaustive manuscript about internal devaluation.

It acknowledges that the internal devaluation can be politically costly and that it requires that the "labour market institutions need to allow for more flexibility, and more product market competition is required", but it misses the point that the development of the human capital cannot occur without the necessary investments. It also mentions the limitations of what can be achieved by the internal devaluation—internal devaluation can result in the "interesting trap of no-downward wage adjustment as the flexible part of earnings vanishes". The article also proposes idea about internal revaluation.

Paul de Grauwe argues that the competitiveness of Portugal, Ireland, Italy, Greece and Spain deteriorated during the period from 1999 to 2008/9, and that since 2008/9 dramatic turnarounds of the competitive positions have occurred in Ireland, Spain and Greece. de Grauwe estimates Ireland to have completed an internal devaluation amounting to 23.5%, Greece 11.4%, Spain 8.9%, Portugal 3.2% and Italy 0.6%.

Pisani-Ferry argues that internal devaluation would optimally entail a simultaneous cut of, say, 10% to all wages and prices in a country. While this is difficult to achieve in practice, he says internal devaluation is not impossible to implement in a meaningful way. Pisani-Ferry says Latvia was rather successful in performing its internal devaluation following the crisis of 2008–09. While the process was painful in terms of unemployment and wage cuts, exports did pick up, the external deficit was eliminated and Latvia's economy returned to growth.

Another alternative (mentioned in old textbooks) is to cut taxes, hence making labour cost cheaper

== Criticism ==
Given the lack of solid empirical studies on the topic, the success of internal devaluation has been considered as an urban legend or even political propaganda by some. According to critics, the eventual success of internal devaluation is based on several myths. Some of them arise from the poor knowledge of the economics by the general population and some are introduced by the politicians and the think tanks that support them.

- Myth 1: It is necessary to create harsh conditions for employees and unemployed to increase the productivity of the workforce.

Critics say this can only happen in select cases where companies do not have the necessary controls in the place for measuring and rewarding the results of the workforce. Such select cases are seen to arise in economies where government policies provide companies with a cheap workforce and the companies are not motivated to invest into the optimization of their processes - the companies can achieve good profit margins from the low workforce costs alone. In other cases investment in the human capital development, the improvement of the company processes and the adoption of new technologies are seen as necessary to improve the productivity. The same analysis can be applied to unemployment benefits as well. There is proof that extended unemployment benefits lead (contrary to the imagination of the general public) to higher GDP, because it opens space for more optimal employer-employee contracts where the employer can get more skilled and loyal employees. Extended unemployment benefits usually lead to the higher unemployment as well but it can be good for the economy, because unemployed people can invest more in gaining skills and knowledge and pursuing for the better workplaces that it could be possible if benefits had not been in place. Some proponents of internal devaluation are right wing politicians who do not believe in investments made by government, but their ideological imagination can be put in perspective if one considers the persistent calls of the European Central Bank and other notable institutions not to reduce government investments during expenditure cuts when fiscal consolidation is done.

- Myth 2: sovereign default is the ultimate evil of the economy of one's country.

Actually some academic literature about sovereign default fails to find any negative medium term consequences of sovereign default. Having said that, opponents of the internal devaluation do not propose default as the solution of the economic problems, instead, they simply point that other goals (e.g. boosting the productivity, investments and increase of GDP and not the putting caps on the sovereign debt) should be taken into account when political decisions are made.

- Myth 3: fiscal stability is the main basis for the growth of economy and for avoiding the financial crisis.

According to critics of internal devaluation, this is a myth if one considers some of the countries where internal devaluation is being applied. Those countries had relatively small debt of the general government before the start of the financial crisis, and the debt has grown immensely during the crisis (mainly for providing government backing for private commercial banks and not for raising expenditures for structural reforms or social safety net). Instead the rapid growth of private debt and equally rapid end to this growth in these countries has led to the financial crisis. The critics say no fiscal solution can prevent similar scenarios recurring in the future. Some argue that the role of central banks should be increased in taming the eventual growth of private debt, e.g. central banks could base reserve requirements to commercial banks based on their assets (e.g. in outstanding mortgage debt vs. debt to private, export-oriented companies) and not on their liabilities as is usually done.

== Practices ==
Critics say some practices of internal devaluation are quite dirty:

- There was at least one case when the right wing majority of the parliament consciously voted into law a bill whose annotation clearly stated that this bill (if adopted) could violate some articles of the constitution, including the article of the "core" of the constitution that defines the country as independent and democratic republic. Later the constitutional court found that the bill indeed had violated the constitution, including the "core" article of the constitution. The initial bill (with annotation) was approved and signed by the right wing prime minister and minister of finances.
- In many cases there has been lack of necessary public debate and discussions by the experts about the necessary changes in the legislation when the measures of the internal devaluation had been adopted (in fact, the previously mentioned anti-constitutional bill had explicit note that the bill (despite its potential violation of the constitution) had not been discussed with the experts). In many cases such measures were adopted in artificially created rush when the right wing governments in power had not wanted their proposals to be questioned. Right wing politicians in command of the internal devaluation in some cases had managed to create impression in the general public (especially before elections) that they were more centric or left leaning that it was in reality. Similarly, the right wing politicians also used (in some cases) ethnic tensions and public debates about uncertain but divisive questions about history to garner public support (ethnic tensions are artificially created by some politicians before elections in the mentioned country, there are no tensions in everyday life, e.g., the mixed marriages are mundane). Actually, lack of clear understanding of the differences between left and right wing economic policies by the general public and the focus on the ethnic questions arguably have been the true reasons why at least one right-wing government has survived the elections even after the internal devaluation had been implemented.
- The growing unemployment resulted in the reduction of wages indeed but the actual result was miserable - e.g. - at least one company had even reported that it was retracting the use of technologies and was restarting the old practices of manual labour, because it was cheaper to find new human employees than to use the technologies. The Internal devaluation can indeed increase the productivity that is defined as the ratio between the added value and labour expenses, but the internal devaluation usually fails to increase the productivity that is defined as the ratio between the added value and the hours worked. Therefore, the capital owners are the main winners of the internal devaluation (in the short-run, namely, because there is no long-run winners of the internal devaluation), but the general welfare is stagnating or even decreasing because of the smaller income per hour and because of wasted human capital that is used inefficiently in the companies that are building its profit margin on the low cost workforce and not by the use of technologies.
- Usually it is advised to combine the internal devaluation with the structural reforms in the government and the economy. In practice there had been lot of calls to implement more structural reforms and not to have flat (bookkeeper-style) cuts of expenditures across all parts of the economy. But one should take into account that structural reforms usually contradicts the internal devaluation, because the structural reforms require flexible and skilled workforce. Structural reforms usually result in high unemployment and attract a lot of criticism if workforce can not adapt and this lack of flexibility usually is due to lack or available resources (education expenses, time for gaining new skills and experience, etc.). There is at least one case when the country is left with immensely large structural unemployment after the internal devaluation.
- Some of the right wing politicians who are the biggest defenders of the internal devaluation have questionable moral standards. They are keen to complain about the lack of money in the treasury but at the same time they can adopt questionable practices for privatisation of state owned bank (as could be seen from the interpolation debates in the parliament) or they can even exploit loopholes in the tax code for personal gains. At the same time there was at least one case when the representative of the right wing government has stood in the parliament and reported that the government has consciously refused to issue at least one regulation (related to the social security matters) that was required by the standing laws of the country because of lack of money in treasury.
- Central government can be keen to transfer its responsibilities to municipalities, sometimes without providing them with the necessary tax incomes. The debate about seniority of claims on mortgage debtors was some example how such governments prefer to create favourable conditions for foreign banks and decrease the opportunities of work for municipal companies. There are lot of other examples as well.
- There is question whether it is justifiable to have bailouts of failing banks when the country is going through the internal devaluation and when the country requires additional resources (that could be transferred from the bailout funds) for structural reforms.

== Future ==
There are cases when the internal devaluation can be seen as the right solution indeed (as opposite to the external devaluation or other measures). E.g. for some countries which participate in the monetary unions and for countries whose currencies are considered to be already undervalued. But in both cases the internal devaluation can be no more than the substitute for the more profound and effective measures which should be taken. E.g. one should greatly improve the movement freedoms for workforce, goods, services and capitals for the monetary unions to attain the situation where the single currency regime functions smoothly for all the regions some of which are in the different positions of the economic cycle than others.

The estimation of any political decision should take into account the global development of the economy as well. E.g. one can consider the total income and how it is split into the two parts - the income from the capital and the income from the labor. One can observe that the share of the total income that is generated by the labor has declined by some 10% in the last decade or so. This can be partially attributed to the decreased workforce costs (because many large economies has adopted the free market principles and became more integrated in the global trade) but large part of this can be attributed to the development of the technologies. Therefore, - if the internal devaluation is all about the costs of workforce then it can be dreadful for the future, because the future economies apparently will require more and more skilled (and not cheaper) workforce and companies will adopt technologies for all the job positions where it will be profitable (the development of technologies is making more and more technologies available for profitable use in companies) and therefore those work positions will be lost for employees altogether.
