= Jean Pisani-Ferry =

French economist

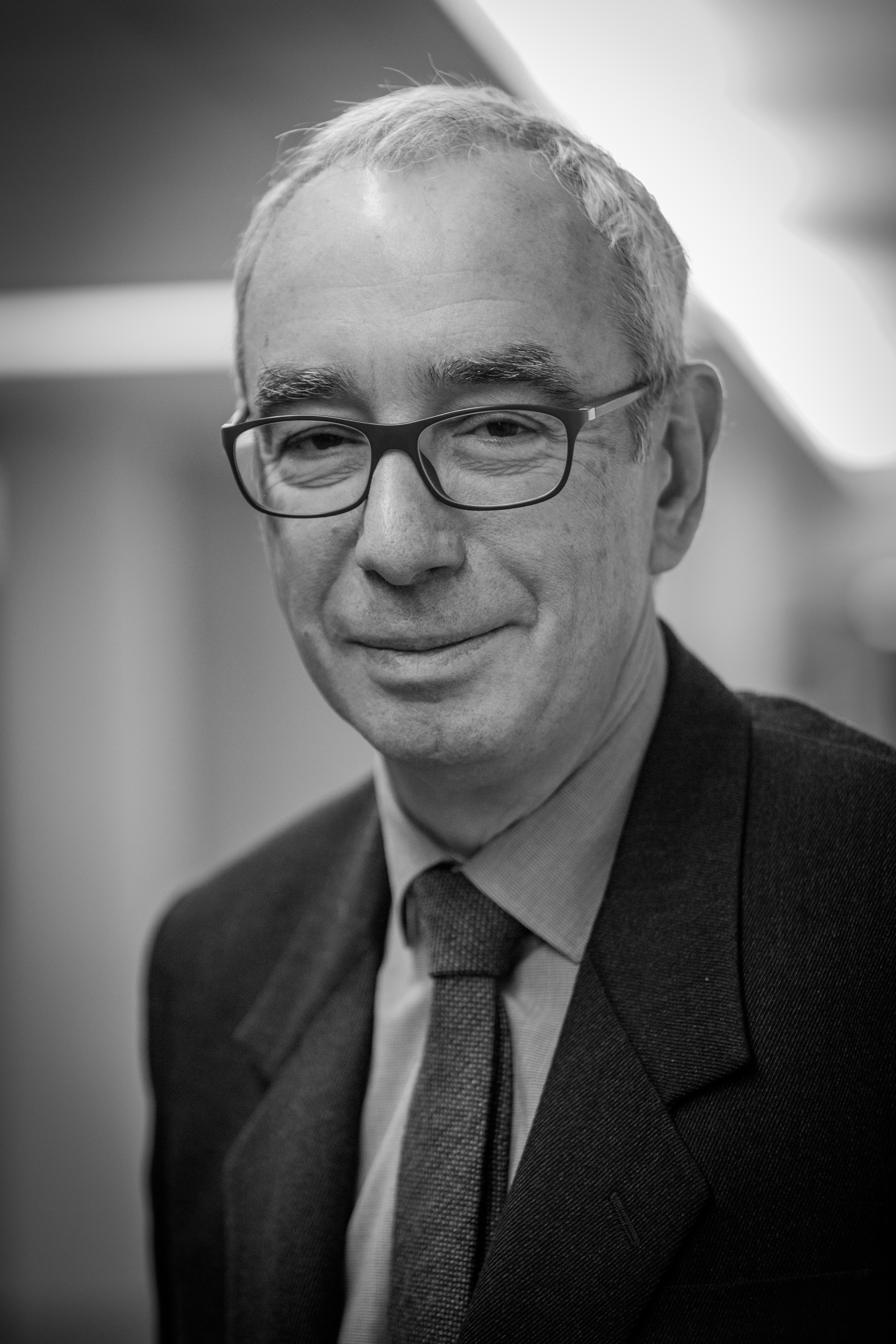
- Born: July 28, 1951 (age 75); Boulogne-Billancourt, France

Academic background
- Education: University of Paris; Supélec

Academic work
- Discipline: Political economy
- Website: Information at IDEAS / RePEc

Jean Pisani-Ferry (born July 28, 1951) is a French economist and public policy expert. He is a fellow at think tanks Bruegel in Brussels and the Peterson Institute for International Economics in Washington, D.C. He is also a senior professor in economics and public management at the Hertie School of Governance in Berlin, and a professor at the European University Institute near Florence.

He served as Commissioner General for Policy Planning under Prime Minister Manuel Valls.

Prior to this appointment, he was Director of Bruegel, the Brussels-based economic think tank, which he had co-founded in the early 2000s together with Nicolas Véron. He was also a professor of economics with Université Paris-Dauphine.

Since 2010, he has written monthly columns for international media organization Project Syndicate.

== Early life and education ==
Born in 1951, the son of politician Edgard Pisani and historian Fresnette Pisani-Ferry, Jean Pisani-Ferry initially trained as an engineer. He has a Master in mathematics. He has an advanced economics degree from the Centre d'études des programmes économiques (CEPE, Paris) and a Master's Degree in Engineering from Supélec.

== Career ==
Early on he held positions in research and government in France. Pisani-Ferry joined the European Commission in 1989 as economic adviser to the European Commission, specifically the Director-General of DG ECFIN.

From 1992 to 1997 he was the director of CEPII, a French economics research centre. In 1997, he became senior economic adviser to the French minister of Finance and was later appointed executive president of the French prime minister's Council of Economic Analysis (2001–2002). He served as senior adviser to the director of the French Treasury from 2002 until 2004. In 2005 and until 2013 he was the founding director of the think tank Bruegel in Brussels. He was president of the French economic association from 2006 until 2007.

From December 2011 until May 2012, Pisani-Ferry served as member of the Jacques Delors Institute’s Tommaso Padoa-Schioppa group, a high-level expert group to reflect on the reform of the Economic and Monetary Union of the European Union. From 2013 until the end of 2016, he was the Commissioner-General of France Stratégie, which is the French government's ideas lab.

Since October 2017, he holds the Tommaso Padoa-Schioppa Chair in European Economic and Monetary Integration at the Robert Schuman Centre, European University Institute. He in 2019 co-wrote the book "Global Governance: Demise or Transformation?" with George Papaconstantinou for the Trans European Policy Studies Association. Early in 2017, he was the Director of programme and ideas of Emmanuel Macron's presidential bid in France.

Pisani-Ferry has taught at universities such as Ecole polytechnique in Paris and Université libre de Bruxelles.

Pisani-Ferry has a regular column in Le Monde and Handelsblatt. He has written recently for publications like El Tiempo and Project Syndicate. He spoke at the fifteenth Trento Festival of Economics in May 2020.

== Other activities ==
- European Council on Foreign Relations, Member
- Berggruen Institute, Member of the Council for the Future of Europe
- Peterson Institute for International Economics, Member of the Advisory Committee
