= Jon Danielsson =

Icelandic economist

Jón Danielsson
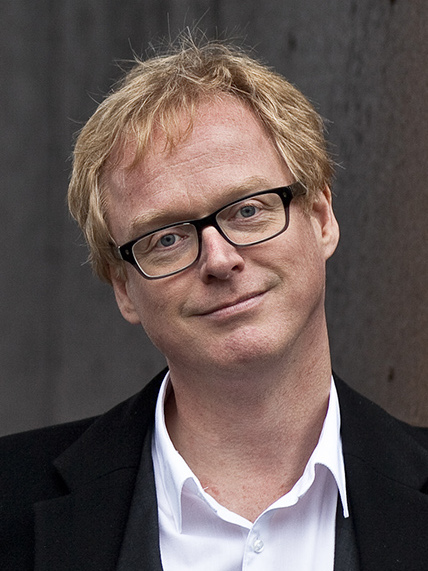
- Danielsson in 2011
- Occupation: Economist

Academic background
- Education: Duke University (PhD)

Academic work
- Discipline: Financial economics, risk analysis
- Institutions: London School of Economics (1997–present)
- Notable ideas: Endogenous risk

Jón Danielsson is an economist working as professor of finance (reader) at the London School of Economics. His work focuses on financial stability, stablecoins, financial risk forecasting, financial regulation, international finance and systemic causes of financial instability. Danielsson has also written on cryptocurrencies and artificial intelligence, and more generally the consequences of novel technologies for the financial system. Danielsson is the author of several books on finance and risk analysis, and is active in both domestic and international policy debates on financial regualtion.

Together with Hyun Song Shin he is credited with coining the term endogenous risk. Danielsson claims such risks are the cause of most financial crises.

Danielsson received his PhD in economics from Duke University in 1991, and began working at the LSE in 1997. He has also spent time at the Bank of Japan and the International Monetary Fund (IMF). In 2012, he was named director of the LSE's Systemic Risk Centre (SRC), which conducts research on financial crises and risk as well as financial regulation.

== Career ==
Danielsson's research areas include systemic risk, artificial intelligence, cryptocurrencies, financial risk, hedge funds, financial regulations, market volatility, liquidity, models of extreme market movements, and microstructure of foreign exchange markets. He has written extensively on the post-crash situation in Iceland.

In 2012, he became director of the Systemic Risk Centre (SRC) at the London School of Economics, which was set up to study the risks that may trigger another financial crisis and to develop tools to help policymakers and financial institutions become better prepared. The centre is funded by ESRC with an annual budget of £1 million.

=== Illusion of control ===
Danielsson published a book with Yale University Press in 2022 titled Illusion of control where he challenges to the conventional wisdom surrounding financial risk, providing insight into why easy solutions to control the financial system are doomed to fail.

=== Artificial intelligence and systemic risk ===
Danielsson, with co-authors, has been studying how artificial intelligence affects financial stability, where they emphasize the importance of considering how known channels of financial system fragilities interact with AI societal risks.

1. Malicious Use of AI: AI can be exploited by profit-driven agents to manipulate systems, engage in socially undesirable activities, or conduct illegal actions like rogue trading and state-sponsored attacks.

2. Overreliance on AI: Excessive dependence on AI, especially in areas with scarce data, can lead to poor policy decisions and increased systemic risk due to AI's confident but incorrect predictions.

3. AI Misalignment: AI systems might not follow intended objectives due to conflicting goals (profit, legality, ethics), leading to destabilizing behavior, particularly during financial stress.

4. Market Structure: AI development is concentrated in a few large firms, creating systemic risk through harmonized beliefs and actions among market participants, amplifying financial booms and busts.

While AI is likely to make most risk management and micro prudential regulations cheaper and more efficient, systemic risk is set to rise. The reason is that AI makes the problem of procyclicality, manipulation and optimization against the system worse than the current human centered set up. They have several recent published paper on the topic, On the use of artificial intelligence in financial regulations and the impact on financial stability, Artificial Intelligence and Systemic Risk and several blogs, like How the financial authorities can take advantage of artificial intelligence and Artificial intelligence as a central banker

=== Central bank reaction to COVID-19 and moral hazard ===
Danielsson, with co-authors, has been studying how central bank reaction to COVID-19, such as macro prudential relaxation, liquidity injections and FX swaps were perceived by the financial markets. They find that the policy interventions were successful in the short term calming of financial markets, but raise serious questions about long-term moral hazard, see, The Calming of Short-Term Market Fears and Its Long-Term Consequences: The Central Banks’ Dilemma.

=== The drivers of financial crises ===
Danielsson and co-authors have studied the problem of how risk affects the likelihood of crises, motivated by Minsky’s observation that stability is destabilizing. Their research, Learning from History: Volatility and Financial Crises finds that prolonged period of low risk make future financial crises will likely. Furthermore, the longer a low risk environment last, the bigger the impact on future economic growth, first positive and then negative, as shown in The Impact of Risk Cycles on Business Cycles: A Historical View.

=== One-in-a-thousand-day problem ===
Danielsson coined the term one-in-a-thousand-day problem arguing financial crises usually inflict the most damage when banks suddenly shift from pursuing profits to survival. Concluding that such drastic behavioural changes render statistical analyses based on normal times ineffective. That is why we cannot predict the likelihood of crises, or what banks will do during those crises. Since this behaviour arises from a natural desire for self-preservation, it cannot be regulated away.

=== Problems with risk measurements ===
Danielsson has authored a series of discussion papers on risk and models, as well as appearing in notable events with major policy makers.

Danielsson and his colleagues have expressed concerns about systemic risk measurements, such as SRISK and CoVaR, because they are based on market outcomes that happen multiple times a year, so that the probability of systemic risk as measured does not correspond to the actual systemic risk in the financial system. They argue that systemic financial crises happen once every 43 years for a typical OECD country and that measurements of systemic risk should target that probability.

Danielsson has published two books on forecasting financial risk. One is an introduction to practical quantitative risk management with a focus on market risk, while the other is on financial stability and uses economic analysis to frame the discussions on the international financial system.

== Recent publications ==
- "Artificial Intelligence and Systemic Risk" 2021 with Robert Macrae and Andreas Uthemann. Journal of Banking and Finance.
- "Learning from History: Volatility and Financial Crises" 2018 with Marcela Valenzuela, and Ilknur Zer. Review of Financial Studies.
- "Model risk of risk models" 2016 with Kevin James, Marcela Valenzuela and Ilknur Zer. Journal of Financial Stability.
- "Can we prove a bank guilty of creating systemic risk? a minority report"* 2016 with Kevin James, Marcela Valenzuela and Ilknur Zer. Journal of Money, Credit and Banking.
- "Fat Tails, VaR and Subadditivity", 2013, with Casper de Vries, Bjorn Jorgensen, Gennady Samorodnitsky and Sarma Mandira. Journal of Econometrics.
- "Risk Models-at-Risk", 2014, with Christophe M. Boucher, Patrick S. Kouontchou and Bertrand B. Maillet. Journal of Banking and Finance
- "Global financial systems: stability and risk", 2013, Pearson
- "Robust Forecasting of Dynamic Conditional Correlation GARCH Models", 2013, with Kris Boudt and Sebastien Laurent. International Journal of Forecasting
- “Endogenous and Systemic Risk", 2012, with Hyun Song Shin and Jean–Pierre Zigrand, NBER Volume on Measuring Systemic Risk, University of Chicago Press.
- "Endogenous Extreme Events and the Dual Role of Prices", 2012 with Jean–Pierre Zigrand and Hyun Song Shin, Annual Reviews in Economics, Volume 4 on the Economics of Extreme Events.
- Financial Risk Forecasting, 2011, Wiley
- "Exchange Rate Determination and Inter–Market Order Flow Effects", 2012, with Jinhui Luo and Richard Payne, European Journal of Finance
- "Liquidity determination in an order-driven market", formerly "Dynamic Liquidity", 2012, with Richard Payne, European Journal of Finance.
- "On the Impact of Fundamentals, Liquidity and Coordination on Market Stability", with Francisco Penaranda, 2011. International Economics Review, 52 (3). pp. 621–638.
