= George-Marios Angeletos =

Greek economist

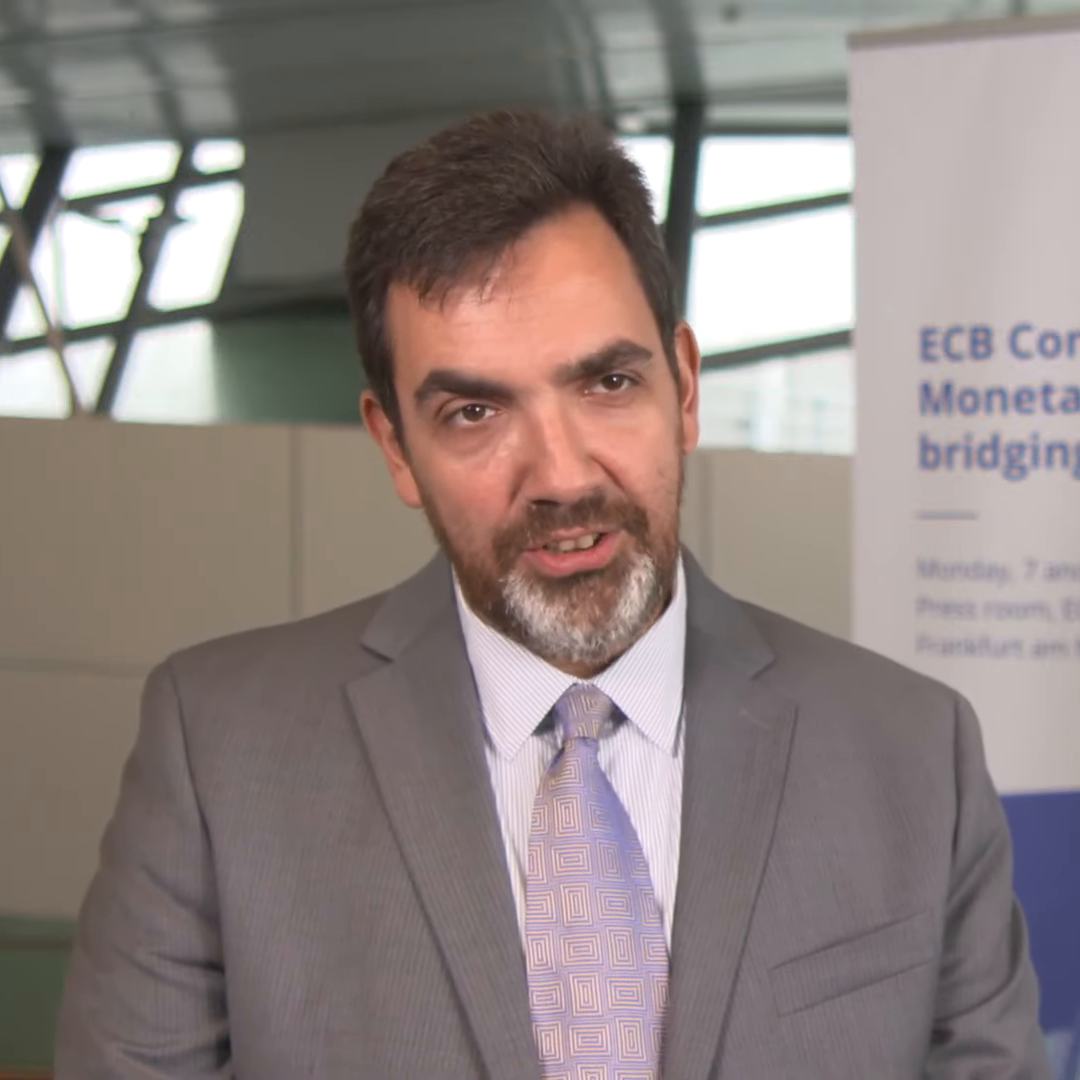
- Born: 1975 (age 50–51); Athens, Greece

Academic background
- Education: Harvard; Athens University of Economics and Business
- Doctoral advisor: Robert J. Barro

Academic work
- Discipline: Macroeconomics
- Institutions: Massachusetts Institute of Technology; Northwestern University
- Awards: Bodossaki Foundation Prize (2008)
- Website: Information at IDEAS / RePEc

George-Marios Angeletos (Greek: Γεώργιος-Μάριος Αγγελέτος; born in 1975, Athens, Greece) is a Greek economist who is a professor of Economics at Northwestern University. He was previously a professor of economics at the Massachusetts Institute of Technology (MIT).

== Early life and education ==
Angeletos was born in Athens, Greece. He earned his B.A. degree in economics from Athens University of Economics and Business in 1996, and received his M.Sc. in Economics in 1997 from the same university. Angeletos earned his Ph.D. in Economics in 2001 from Harvard. Angeletos received a scholarship from the Alexander S. Onassis Foundation to complete his doctorate.

== Academic career ==
After graduating from Harvard, Angeletos became a member of the MIT faculty, and was awarded tenure there in 2007. In 2006, Angeletos received a Sloan Fellowship, awarded by the Alfred P. Sloan Foundation. Shortly after receiving tenure, Angeletos won the Bodossaki Foundation Prize in Social Sciences for distinguished young Greek scientists in 2008. During 2013–14, Angeletos held the Chair of Macroeconomics and Finance at the University of Zurich.

== Contributions to economics ==
Angeletos has published many articles in the field of macroeconomics. In particular, much of his research has investigated the impact of informational frictions in macro settings. He has made many notable contributions to the field of global games, which followed the work of Stephen Morris and Hung Song Shin. More recently, his work has focused on the roles of expectations, information, and bounded rationality in the business cycle.

== Sources ==
- George-Marios Angeletos, Christian Hellwig, and Alessandro Pavan (2006), "Signaling in a Global Game: Coordination and Policy Traps," Journal of Political Economy, 114 (3), 452–484.
- George-Marios Angeletos, Christian Hellwig, and Alessandro Pavan (2007), "Dynamic Global Games of Regime Change: Learning, Multiplicity and Timing of Attacks," Econometrica, 75 (3), 711–756.
- George-Marios Angeletos and Ivan Werning (2006), "Crises and Prices: Information Aggregation, Multiplicity, and Volatility," American Economic Review, 96 (5), 1720–36.
- George-Marios Angeletos and Alessandro Pavan (2007), "Efficient Use of Information and Social Value of Information," Econometrica, 75 (4).
- Stephen Morris and Hyun Song Shin (1998), "Unique Equilibrium in a Model of Self-Fulfilling Currency Attacks," American Economic Review, 88 (3), 587–97.
