= Brunello Rosa =

Italian economist and academic

Brunello Rosa is an economist and academic. He is the co-founder and chief executive officer of Rosa & Roubini Associates. He has held academic positions at the London School of Economics (LSE), Bocconi University and the University of London.

== Early life and career ==
Brunello Rosa studied economics at the University of Siena, where he received a Bachelor of Science degree and later a Master's degree in Economics, graduating cum laude in 2001. In 2003, he attended the Summer School in Advanced Econometrics at the London School of Economics, followed by a Master of Science degree in Finance and Economics in 2004 at the London School of Economics.

Rosa began his academic career at the University of Siena's Centre for Complex Systems Studies, where he worked as a research fellow. At the London School of Economics, he held research and teaching positions, including roles with the Financial Markets Group and the Systemic Risk Centre. He also taught finance and macroeconomics at the university. Rosa has served as a visiting senior fellow at the LSE's School of Public Policy and at its Centre For Macroeconomics (CFM) of the London School of Economics. At Bocconi University, Rosa has served as a visiting professor and Senior Executive Fellow. At City, University of London, he served as Research Fellow and visiting professor.

Rosa started his career as a research analyst and fixed-income strategist at IDEAglobal. He later joined the Bank of England, where he worked in the areas of markets and financial stability. Subsequently, he worked at the Centre for the Central Banking Studies of the Bank of England. Rosa later joined Roubini Global Economics, where he served as co-head of research and managing director. In 2017, Rosa co-founded Rosa & Roubini Associates with Nouriel Roubini.

Rosa has participated in policy discussions concerning monetary policy, financial stability and digital currencies. He has served as an adviser on digital payments at the Bank of England and as an adviser of the Chief Economist of the European Investment Bank. He has also participated in discussions concerning central bank digital currencies and regulatory frameworks for digital assets.

Rosa has published research and commentary on monetary policy, financial stability, digital currencies and geopolitical developments. He has written for publications including Project Syndicate and has contributed to research by institutions such as the Centre for Economic Policy Research. Rosa has also authored and co-authored books and research publications concerning monetary policy, financial regulation and digital currencies.

Selected publications

- Smart Money: How Digital Currencies Will Shape the New World Order
- The geopolitical relevance of central bank digital currencies
- The Great Reset and the Future of Money
- The European Union and the international monetary system
