= Christian Hellwig =

German economist

Academic background
- Education: London School of Economics

Academic work
- Discipline: Economic theory, Macroeconomics
- School or tradition: Neoclassical economics
- Institutions: Toulouse School of Economics
- Notable ideas: public information in global games
- Website: Information at IDEAS / RePEc

Christian Hellwig is a German economic theorist and macroeconomist who did research in the field of global games. He is the editor of the Journal of Economic Theory.

== Biography ==
Hellwig obtained a B.A. in Economics at the University of Lausanne in 1998, a M.Sc. in Econometrics and mathematical economics by the London School of Economics (LSE) in 1999, and a Ph.D. in Economics at LSE in 2003 with his thesis entitled "Money, Intermediation and Coordination in Decentralised Markets". He spent the last two years of his doctorate as a visiting scholar at MIT. He became an assistant professor at UCLA in 2002 and became a tenured associate professor in 2007. Hellwig took up the position of Associate Professor at Toulouse School of Economics in 2010 where he is currently employed. In addition to his academic position, Hellwig is a Research Affiliate at the Centre for Economic Policy Research since 2007 and became the editor of the Journal of Economic Theory in June 2008. He is a member of the Board of Editors of the American Economic Review since April 2007.

As an undergraduate he spent time studying abroad at Oberlin College, where he played on the men's basketball team.

He is the son of the economist Martin Hellwig. He is a fellow of the European Economic Association.

== Research contribution ==
Hellwig studied the effects of exogenous and endogenous public information in global coordination games and showed that multiplicity of equilibria is restored under fairly general conditions.

Global coordination games belong to a subfield of game theory which started with the article by Morris and Shin (1998). Steven Morris and Hyun Song Shin considered a stylized currency crises model, in which traders observe the relevant fundamentals with small noise, and show that this leads to the selection of a unique equilibrium. This result is in stark contrast with models of complete information, which feature multiple equilibria. However, there are potential problems with this result due to the lack of a theory of prices in global coordination games (Atkeson, 2001).

Hellwig studied the effects of exogenous public information in global coordination games and showed that this may restore multiplicity under fairly general conditions (Hellwig, 2002). Hellwig and co-authors (2006) address the concern by Atkeson (2001) by considering a more explicit market structure and model the public information endogenously as an interest rate signal. They show that equilibrium multiplicity may be restored by the endogenous public signal, provided that private information is sufficiently precise, which coincides with the findings by Angeletos and Werning (2006).
