= Dirk Bergemann =

American economist

- Born: September 23, 1964 (age 62)
- Occupations: Professor; economist
- Title: Douglass & Marion Campbell Professor of Economics and Computer Science

Academic background
- Education: Goethe University Frankfurt; University of Pennsylvania
- Doctoral advisor: George Mailath

Academic work
- Discipline: Game theory; contract theory; mechanism design
- Institutions: Yale University
- Notable ideas: Bayes correlated equilibrium

Dirk Bergemann (born 23 September 1964) is a German-American economist and the Douglass and Marion Campbell Professor of Economics at Yale University, where he also holds secondary appointments as Professor of Computer Science and Professor of Finance. He is the founding director of the Center for Algorithms, Data, and Market Design at Yale (CADMY). A fellow of the American Academy of Arts and Sciences and the Econometric Society, Bergemann is recognized for foundational contributions to mechanism design, information design, and the economics of data and digital markets.

Bergemann's research spans three interconnected areas that have shaped modern economic theory: robust mechanism design (with Stephen Morris), which relaxes the strong informational assumptions of classical mechanism design and provides theoretical foundations for practical auction formats; information design, which studies how the strategic provision of information affects economic outcomes; and the economics of data and digital platforms, which addresses pricing, privacy, and competition in data-driven markets. His work with Morris on Bayes correlated equilibrium introduced a widely adopted solution concept for studying the effects of information structures in games. He has published over 60 articles in leading journals, including Econometrica, the American Economic Review, the Journal of Political Economy, and The Review of Economic Studies.

== Early life and education ==
Bergemann was born in Germany in 1964. He earned his Vordiplom in economics from Goethe University Frankfurt in 1989, supported by a Fulbright Scholarship to pursue graduate studies in the United States. He received his M.A. (1992) and Ph.D. (1994) in economics from the University of Pennsylvania, where his doctoral committee was chaired by George Mailath, with Andrew Postlewaite serving as committee member. His dissertation, “Essays in Learning and Intertemporal Incentives,” explored dynamic learning and strategic behavior, themes that would inform much of his subsequent research. During his graduate studies, he was supported by a fellowship from the Studienstiftung.

== Academic career ==
Bergemann began his academic career at Princeton University in 1994. He joined Yale University as an assistant professor in 1995, was promoted to associate professor with tenure in 2001, and became a full professor in 2003. Since 2005, he has held the Douglass and Marion Campbell Professorship of Economics. He holds secondary appointments as Professor of Computer Science in the School of Engineering and Applied Sciences (since 2008) and Professor of Finance at the Yale School of Management (since 2015), reflecting the interdisciplinary reach of his work.

Bergemann served as Chair of the Department of Economics at Yale from 2013 to 2019, a period during which the department substantially expanded its physical and intellectual footprint. In 2022, he founded the Center for Algorithms, Data, and Market Design at Yale (CADMY), an interdisciplinary center bridging economics, computer science, and data science.

He has been a staff member of the Cowles Foundation for Research in Economics since 1996. He has held visiting positions at the Massachusetts Institute of Technology (2021–2022), Google Research New York (2019–2020), Columbia University (2004–2005), LMU Munich (DFG Mercator Professorship, 2003–2004). Since 2021, he has served as a Scholar at Amazon. He is a Research Fellow of CEPR and CESifo.

== Research ==
=== Robust mechanism design ===
Bergemann's most sustained research collaboration has been with Stephen Morris on robust mechanism design, a program that began in the early 2000s and has produced dozens of articles and a book. Classical mechanism design, following the tradition of Leonid Hurwicz, Roger Myerson, and Eric Maskin, typically assumes that the designer knows the probability distribution (the “common prior”) from which agents’ private information is drawn. Bergemann and Morris questioned this assumption, asking which mechanisms perform well regardless of agents’ higher-order beliefs.

Their foundational paper “Robust Mechanism Design” (Econometrica, 2005) showed that when the designer cannot rely on common knowledge of the type distribution, the class of incentive-compatible mechanisms narrows considerably, and the mechanisms that survive this robustness test tend to be simpler ones—such as dominant-strategy mechanisms.

=== Information design and Bayes correlated equilibrium ===
In a second major line of work, again with Morris, Bergemann helped establish the field of information design—the study of how an informed principal (an “information designer”) can influence outcomes by choosing what information to reveal to agents. While related to the Bayesian persuasion framework of Emir Kamenica and Matthew Gentzkow, information design extends the analysis to settings with multiple agents who may already hold private information.

Their paper “Bayes Correlated Equilibrium and the Comparison of Information Structures in Games” (Theoretical Economics, 2016) introduced the concept of Bayes correlated equilibrium (BCE), a solution concept that characterizes the set of all possible outcomes that can arise across all possible information structures in a given game.

=== Price discrimination and market segmentation ===
With Benjamin Brooks and Morris, Bergemann analyzed the welfare limits of third-degree price discrimination in “The Limits of Price Discrimination” (American Economic Review, 2015). The paper characterized the full set of consumer and producer surplus combinations achievable through market segmentation, showing that segmentation can range from transferring all gains to the producer to achieving full efficiency with all additional surplus going to consumers. This result drew on the information-design methodology and has become influential in industrial organization, data economics, and antitrust analysis. The collaboration with Brooks and Morris also produced “First-Price Auctions with General Information Structures” (Econometrica, 2017), characterizing bidding and revenue in first-price auctions across all possible information environments.

=== Dynamic mechanism design and learning ===
A long-running collaboration with Juuso Välimäki produced foundational work on dynamic economic interactions under uncertainty. Their early papers on learning and strategic pricing (Econometrica, 1996) and experimentation in markets (Review of Economic Studies, 2000) studied how agents learn from market outcomes. “Dynamic Pricing of New Experience Goods” (Journal of Political Economy, 2006) analyzed optimal pricing when a firm and consumers simultaneously learn about product quality.“The Dynamic Pivot Mechanism” (Econometrica, 2010) extended the celebrated VCG mechanism to dynamic settings, providing an efficient mechanism for sequential allocation problems. This body of work was collected in Learning and Intertemporal Incentives (World Scientific, 2020), and surveyed in “Dynamic Mechanism Design: An Introduction” (Journal of Economic Literature, 2019).

=== Economics of data, digital platforms, and advertising ===
With Alessandro Bonatti, Bergemann has developed an extensive research program on the economics of data and digital markets. “The Design and Price of Information” (American Economic Review, 2018) studied how an information intermediary should optimally price data products. “Selling Cookies” (American Economic Journal: Microeconomics, 2015) and “Targeting in Advertising Markets” (RAND Journal of Economics, 2011) examined the implications of consumer data for advertising and media markets. “Data, Competition and Digital Platforms” (American Economic Review, 2024) analyzed how data accumulation affects platform competition.

== Editorial service ==
Bergemann has served in senior editorial roles at the profession's top journals. He has been co-editor of American Economic Review: Insights since 2020, and previously served as co-editor of Econometrica (2014–2018) and editor of the Journal of the European Economic Association (2011–2014). He has also held associate editor positions at Econometrica, the American Economic Journal: Microeconomics, Games and Economic Behavior, the Journal of Economic Theory, The Review of Economic Studies, Theoretical Economics, and the RAND Journal of Economics.

== Honors and fellowships ==
Bergemann was elected a Fellow of the American Academy of Arts and Sciences in 2021. He is a Fellow of the Econometric Society (2007), the European Economic Association (2012), and the Society for the Advancement of Economic Theory (2015). He received an Alfred P. Sloan Research Fellowship in 1999. He has delivered plenary lectures at the World Congress of the Game Theory Society, the Econometric Society Summer and Winter Meetings, the Royal Economic Society Annual Meeting, the ACM Conference on Economics and Computation, and the Stony Brook Game Theory Conference, among others.

== Selected publications ==
=== Books ===
- Learning and Intertemporal Incentives (with Juuso Välimäki), World Scientific, 2020.
- Robust Mechanism Design (with Stephen Morris), World Scientific, 2012.

=== Journal articles (selected) ===
- “Screening with Persuasion” (with T. Heumann and S. Morris), Journal of Political Economy, 2026.
- “Data, Competition and Digital Platforms” (with A. Bonatti), American Economic Review, 2024.
- “How Do Digital Advertising Auctions Impact Product Prices?” (with A. Bonatti and N. Wu), Review of Economic Studies, 2025.
- “Information Design: A Unified Perspective” (with S. Morris), Journal of Economic Literature, 2019.
- “Dynamic Mechanism Design: An Introduction” (with J. Välimäki), Journal of Economic Literature, 2019.
- “The Design and Price of Information” (with A. Bonatti and A. Smolin), American Economic Review, 2018.
- “First-Price Auctions with General Information Structures” (with B. Brooks and S. Morris), Econometrica, 2017.
- “The Limits of Price Discrimination” (with B. Brooks and S. Morris), American Economic Review, 2015.
- “Robust Predictions in Games with Incomplete Information” (with S. Morris), Econometrica, 2013.
- “The Dynamic Pivot Mechanism” (with J. Välimäki), Econometrica, 2010.
- “Robust Implementation in Direct Mechanisms” (with S. Morris), Review of Economic Studies, 2009.
- “Dynamic Pricing of New Experience Goods” (with J. Välimäki), Journal of Political Economy, 2006.
- “Robust Mechanism Design” (with S. Morris), Econometrica, 2005.
- “Information Acquisition and Efficient Mechanism Design” (with J. Välimäki), Econometrica, 2002.

· “Learning and Strategic Pricing” (with J. Välimäki), Econometrica, 1996.

== Other activities ==
Bergemann has been active in institutional leadership at Yale, including service on the Cowles Foundation Executive Committee, the Yale Graduate School Executive Committee, the Tobin Center for Economic Policy Executive Committee, and as academic advisor for the joint major in Economics and Mathematics. He serves on the academic advisory boards of the Mannheim Graduate School and the MIT Institute for Data, Systems and Society. He is an academic advisor for the Heinrich Böll Foundation and the Hans Böckler Foundation.
