= Global game =

Concept in economics and game theory

In economics and game theory, global games are games of incomplete information where players receive possibly-correlated signals of the underlying state of the world. Global games were originally defined by Carlsson and van Damme (1993).

The most important practical application of global games has been the study of crises in financial markets such as bank runs, currency crises, and bubbles. However, they have other relevant applications such as investments with payoff complementarities, beauty contests, political riots and revolutions, and any other economic situation which displays strategic complementarity.

== Global games in models of currency crises ==
Stephen Morris and Hyun Song Shin (1998) considered a stylized currency crises model, in which traders observe the relevant fundamentals with small noise, and show that this leads to the selection of a unique equilibrium. This result overturns the result in models of complete information, which feature multiple equilibria.

One concern with the robustness of this result is that the introduction of a theory of prices in global coordination games may reintroduce multiplicity of equilibria. This concern was addressed in Angeletos and Werning (2006) as well as Hellwig and coauthors (2006). They show that equilibrium multiplicity may be restored by the existence of prices acting as an endogenous public signal, provided that private information is sufficiently precise.
