= Systemic Risk Centre =

- Other name: SRC
- Established: 2012
- Affiliations: London School of Economics, University College London,
- Director: Jon Danielsson, Jean-Pierre Zigrand
- Location: London, United Kingdom
- Website: www.systemicrisk.ac.uk

The Systemic Risk Centre (SRC) is a research centre in London, hosted at the London School of Economics and dedicated to the study of systemic risk and the development of policies for addressing the effects of financial crises.

The SRC is funded by the Economic and Social Research Council (ESRC) and was founded in 2012. Its funding was renewed for another five years in 2018.

The SRC finds that the underlying driver of financial crisis is endogenous risk, described in the SRC Magazine.

== Organization ==
The SRC has two directors, Jon Danielsson and Jean-Pierre Zigrand, staff of eight researchers and faculty from the London School of Economics (LSE) and the University College London (UCL).

== Research ==
The Centre's main research activities are divided into four different areas:

1. Endogenous Risk
2. Amplification Mechanisms
3. Policy Responses
4. Identifying Risk

SRC Research is disseminated through events, workshops, seminars and published materials – in particular, through a discussion paper series, an events programme and System Risk's youtube channel. The SRC organized a joint event with the International Monetary Fund on Macroprudential Stress Test and Policies: A Framework. SRC director Jean-Pierre Zigrand was appointed in April 2017 as the UK head of global financial research project to analyse high frequency financial data.
