= Endogenous risk =

Financial risk

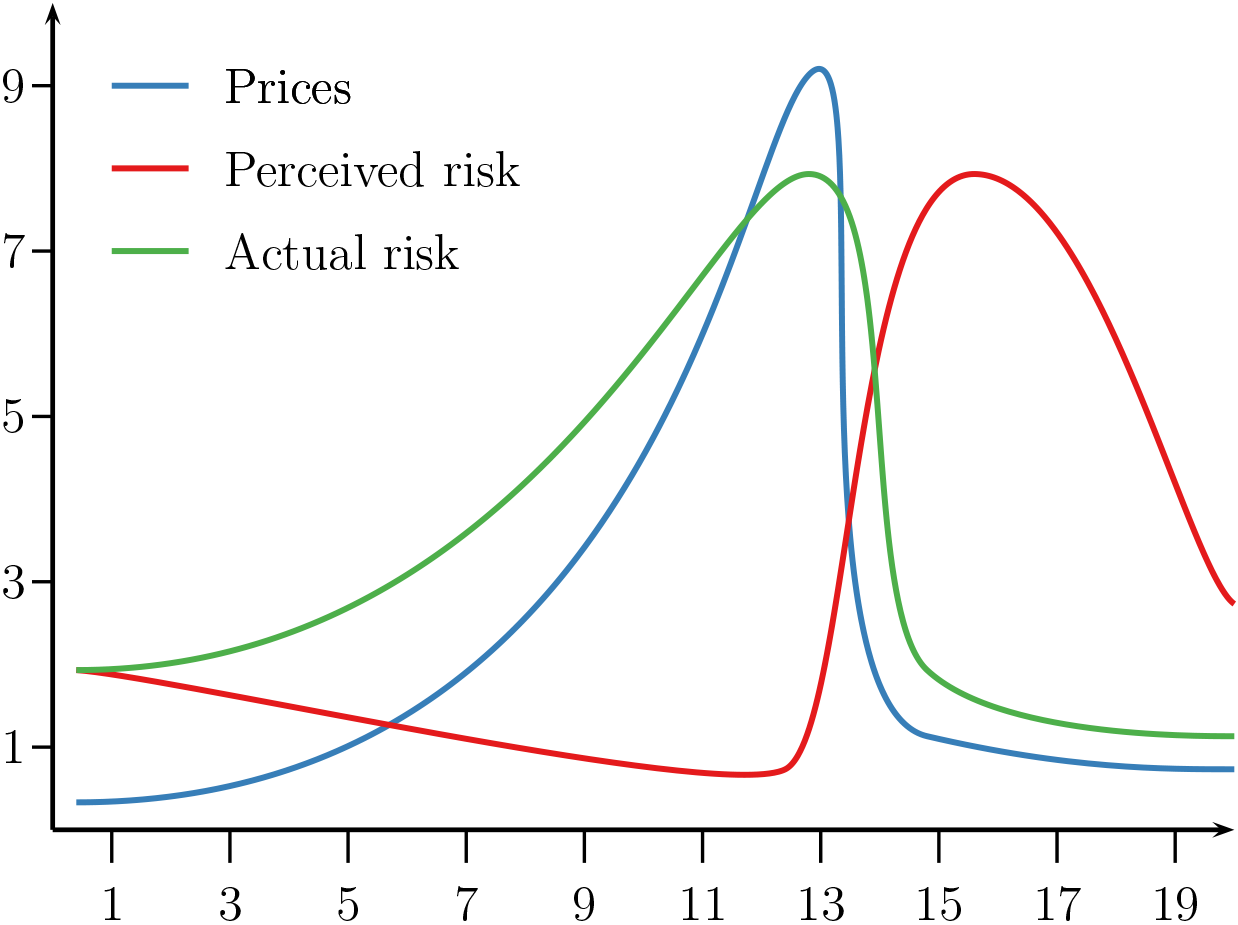
Actual and perceived risk

Endogenous risk, as opposed to exogenous risk, is a type of financial risk that is created by the interaction of market participants internal to the financial system. It was proposed by Jon Danielsson and Hyun-Song Shin in 2002.

Risk can be classified into the two categories of exogenous and endogenous. Exogenous risk is risk stemming from factors outside the financial system, such as political instability, natural disasters, or a pandemic, which may have severe effects on asset prices. Market participants react to these shocks, but have no influence over them. By contrast, endogenous risk is risk stemming from the behaviour of participants within the financial system, such as when positive economic outlooks cause innovation of new financial products, increased leverage, and speculation; these self-reinforcing processes feed on each other to increase risk. Such endogenous factors, Danielsson and Shin claim, are behind most tail events and severe financial crises. They further claim that all systemic risk is a form of endogenous risk.

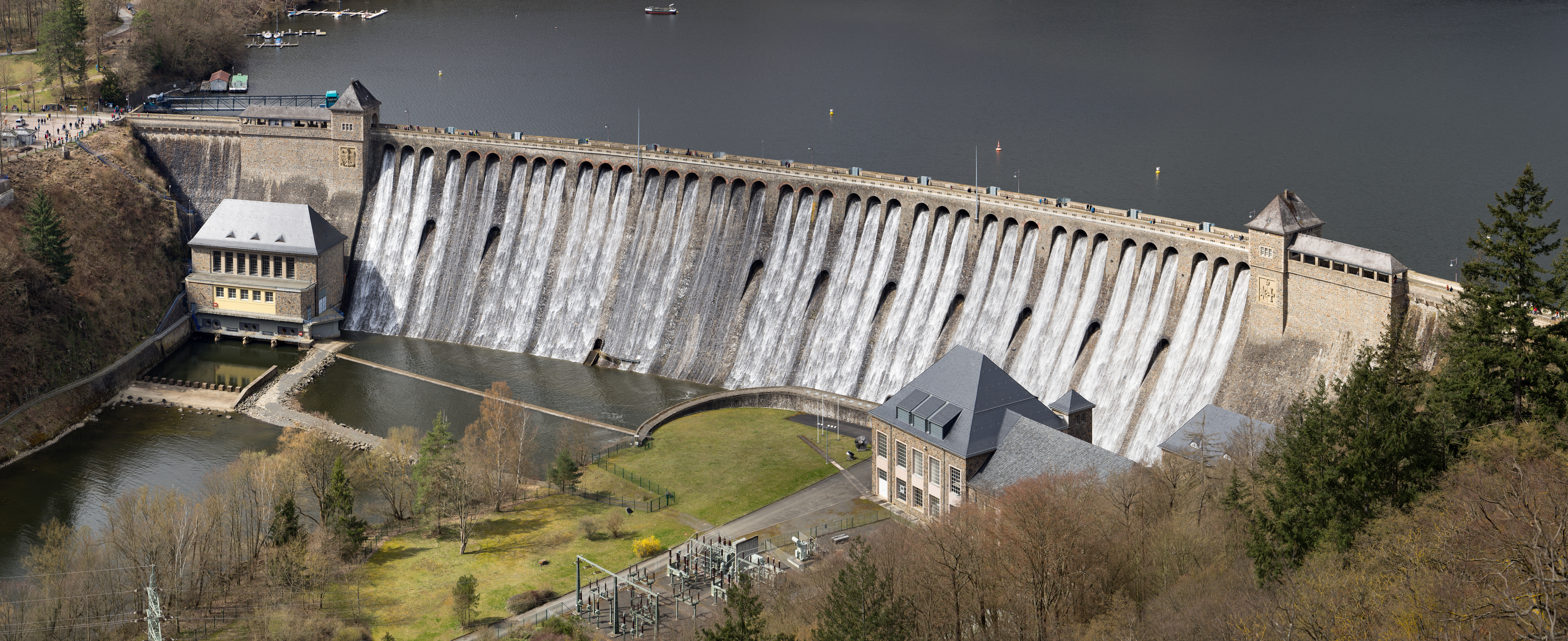
Danielsson's dam metaphor: A dam is a good illustration of actual and perceived risk. Before the dam breaks, risk is perceived as low, and we leave the dam as it is. After the dam breaks, risk is perceived as high, and we institute crisis measures. The endogenous or actual risk in the system is the opposite of the perceived risk: when tensions build up before the dam breaks, actual or endogenous risk in the system is high and growing, amplified by self-reinforcing weaknesses. After the dam has broken, actual or endogenous risk in the system is low.

As a practical interpretation of endogenous risk when applied to risk measurements, it can be further subdivided into actual risk; the underlying latent risk, and perceived risk; what is reported by common risk measurement techniques, such as value at risk and expected shortfall. Shown in the figure on the right, as a financial asset enters into a bubble state, followed by a crash, perceived risk reported by typical risk measures, falls as the bubble builds up, sharply increasing after the bubble deflates. By contrast, actual risk increases along with the bubble, falling at the same time the bubble bursts. Perceived risk and actual risk are negatively correlated. The phenomenon is often explained by use of Danielsson's dam metaphor.

== Policy implications ==
The theory of endogenous risk has influenced macroprudential regulation, particularly after the 2007–2008 financial crisis. Policymakers have increasingly recognized that financial regulation must account for system-wide feedback effects rather than focusing solely on individual institutions. Institutions such as the Bank for International Settlements (BIS) have discussed how procyclical risk measurement can contribute to systemic instability.

== See also ==
- Supply chain network risk analysis
