= Bayes correlated equilibrium =

Solution concept in Game Theory

- Solution concept in game theory

Relationship
- Superset of: Correlated equilibrium, Bayesian Nash equilibrium

Significance
- Proposed by: Dirk Bergemann, Stephen Morris

In game theory, a Bayes correlated equilibrium is a solution concept for static games of incomplete information. It is both a generalization of the correlated equilibrium perfect-information solution concept to bayesian games, and also a broader solution concept than the usual Bayesian Nash equilibrium thereof. Additionally, it can be seen as a generalized multi-player solution of the Bayesian persuasion information design problem.

Intuitively, a Bayes correlated equilibrium allows for players to correlate their actions in such a way that no player has an incentive to deviate for every possible type they may have. It was first proposed by Dirk Bergemann and Stephen Morris.

== Formal definition ==
=== Preliminaries ===
Let $I$ be a set of players, and $\Theta$ a set of possible states of the world. A game is defined as a tuple $G = \langle (A_i, u_i)_{i \in I}, \Theta, \psi \rangle$, where $A_i$ is the set of possible actions (with $A = \prod_{i \in I} A_i$) and $u_i : A\times \Theta \rightarrow \mathbb{R}$ is the utility function for each player, and $\psi \in \Delta_{++} (\Theta)$ is a full support common prior over the states of the world.

An information structure is defined as a tuple $S = \langle (T_i)_{i \in I}, \pi \rangle$, where $T_i$ is a set of possible signals (or types) each player can receive (with $T = \prod_{i \in I} T_i$), and $\pi : \Theta \rightarrow \Delta (T)$ is a signal distribution function, informing the probability $\pi (t | \theta)$ of observing the joint signal $t \in T$ when the state of the world is $\theta \in \Theta$.

By joining those two definitions, one can define $\Gamma = (G, S)$ as an incomplete information game. A decision rule for the incomplete information game $\Gamma = (G, S)$ is a mapping $\sigma: T \times \Theta \rightarrow \Delta (A)$. Intuitively, the value of decision rule $\sigma (a | t, \theta)$ can be thought of as a joint recommendation for players to play the joint mixed strategy $\sigma (\cdot \mid t, \theta) \in \Delta(A)$ when the joint signal received is $t \in T$ and the state of the world is $\theta \in \Theta$.

=== Definition ===
A Bayes correlated equilibrium (BCE) is defined to be a decision rule $\sigma$ which is obedient: that is, one where no player has an incentive to unilaterally deviate from the recommended joint strategy, for any possible type they may be. Formally, decision rule $\sigma$ is obedient (and a Bayes correlated equilibrium) for game $\Gamma = (G, S)$ if, for every player $i \in I$, every signal $t_i \in T_i$ and every action $a_i \in A_i$, we have

$$\sum_{a_{-i}, t_{-i}, \theta} \psi (\theta) \pi (t_i, t_{-i} | \theta) \sigma (a_i, a_{-i} | t_i, t_{-i} ,\theta) u_i(a_i, a_{-i}, \theta)$$

$$\geq \sum_{a_{-i}, t_{-i}, \theta} \psi (\theta) \pi (t_i, t_{-i} | \theta) \sigma (a_i, a_{-i} | t_i, t_{-i} ,\theta) u_i(a'_i, a_{-i}, \theta)$$

for all $a'_i \in A_i$.

That is, every player obtains a higher expected payoff by following the recommendation from the decision rule than by deviating to any other possible action.

== Relation to other concepts ==
=== Bayesian Nash equilibrium ===
Every Bayesian Nash equilibrium (BNE) of an incomplete information game can be thought of a as BCE, where the recommended joint strategy is simply the equilibrium joint strategy.

Formally, let $\Gamma = (G, S)$ be an incomplete information game, and let $s : T \rightarrow \Delta(A)$ be an equilibrium joint strategy, with each player $i$ playing $s_i (a_i | t_i) \in \Delta (A_i)$. Therefore, the definition of BNE implies that, for every $i \in I$, $t_i \in T_i$ and $a_i \in A_i$ such that $s_i (a_i | t_i) > 0$, we have

$$\sum_{a_{-i}, t_{-i}, \theta} \psi (\theta) \pi (t_i, t_{-i} | \theta) \left(\prod_{j \neq i} s_j (a_j | t_j) \right) u_i(a_i, a_{-i}, \theta)$$

$$\geq \sum_{a_{-i}, t_{-i}, \theta} \psi (\theta) \pi (t_i, t_{-i} | \theta) \left(\prod_{j \neq i} s_j (a_j | t_j) \right) u_i(a'_i, a_{-i}, \theta)$$

for every $a'_i \in A_i$.

If we define the decision rule $\sigma$ on $\Gamma$ as $\sigma (a | t, \theta) = s(a | t) = \prod_{i} s_i (a_i | t_i)$ for all $t \in T$ and $\theta \in \Theta$, we directly get a BCE.

=== Correlated equilibrium ===
If there is no uncertainty about the state of the world (e.g., if $\Theta$ is a singleton), then the definition collapses to Aumann's correlated equilibrium solution. In this case, $\sigma \in \Delta (A)$ is a BCE if, for every $i \in I$, we have

$$\sum_{a_{-i} \in A{-i}}  \sigma (a_i, a_{-i}) u_i(a_i, a_{-i})  \geq \sum_{a_{-i} \in A{-i}}  \sigma (a_i, a_{-i}) u_i(a'_i, a_{-i})$$

for every $a'_i \in A_i$, which is equivalent to the definition of a correlated equilibrium for such a setting.

=== Bayesian persuasion ===
Additionally, the problem of designing a BCE can be thought of as a multi-player generalization of the Bayesian persuasion problem from Emir Kamenica and Matthew Gentzkow. More specifically, let $v : A \times \Theta \rightarrow \mathbb R$ be the information designer's objective function. Then her ex-ante expected utility from a BCE decision rule $\sigma$ is given by:

$$V(\sigma) = \sum_{a, t, \theta} \psi (\theta) \pi(t | \theta) \sigma (a | t, \theta) v(a, \theta)$$

If the set of players $I$ is a singleton, then choosing an information structure to maximize $V(\sigma)$ is equivalent to a Bayesian persuasion problem, where the information designer is called a Sender and the player is called a Receiver.
