= Flight-to-liquidity =

A flight-to-liquidity is a financial market phenomenon occurring when investors sell what they perceive to be less liquid or higher risk investments, and purchase more liquid investments instead, such as US Treasuries. Usually, flight-to-liquidity quickly results in panic leading to a crisis.

For example, after the Russian government defaulted on its government bonds (GKOs) in 1998 many investors sold European and Japanese government bonds and purchased on-the-run US Treasuries instead. (The most recently issued treasuries, known as “on-the-run”, have larger trading volumes, that is more liquidity, than treasury issues that have been superseded, known as “off-the run”.) This widened the spread between off-the-run and on-the-run US Treasuries, which ultimately led to the 1998 collapse of the Long-Term Capital Management hedge fund.

== See also ==
- Financial contagion
- Financial crisis
- Flight-to-quality
- Stock market crash
