= Shanghai rubber stock market crisis =

1910 economic crisis in China

Shanghai Rubber Stock Market Crisis (Chinese: 橡皮股票风潮) was an economic crisis caused by the bankers and stock-holders overstimulating the rubber stocks in Shanghai in 1910. This crisis led to a great number of bankruptcies of Chinese native banks in Tianjing, Guangzhou, etc. Historically, this crisis, accomplished with the market crisis in the 1920s, brought massive destruction of market development in Shanghai.

== Background ==
In the late period of Qing dynasty (the earlier 20th century), the automobile industry was growing, accomplished with the product of rubber. In the United States, the export of rubber increased from $57 million in 1908 to $70 million in 1909. In Britain, the export of rubber grew from 840 thousands pounds in 1908 to 1.41 million pounds in 1909. This demand stimulated prices of the commodity. Under the highest needs of rubbers, many rubbers companies began to wage money from stock markets, which also happened in Shanghai . For example, Langkate, Perak, Kalumpong, Senawang, Tebong companies began to collect funds from stock market in the 1900s.

== Process ==
=== Fundamentals-driven market ===
Accomplished with the higher price of rubber in 1909, the related stock prices got a huge increase. Banks provided a series of convenient services of securities loans for the rubber stocks. First, the foreign banks announced to regulate mortgage discount at the level of 50%-80%; The Chinese native banks (钱庄) and Chinese Merchants Bank followed. To a certain extent, these financing activities inflamed the rubber stocks.

Here are some stock prices (per share) in this peak period:

- Langkate: 1080 Tael on March 2nd, 1910; 1300T on March 18th; 1675T on March 29th; then kept at the range between 1400 and 1500 Tael;
- Senawang: 630 Tael on February 25th, 1910; 750T on March 9th; 1200T on March 18th; 1325T on March 29th; 1425T on March 30th; 1550T on April 7th; 1600T on April 15th; 1650T on April 21st; 1675T on April 25th; 1625T on May 10th; 1400T on May 30th; 1300T on June 27th; 1300T on July 6th; 1375T on July 11th.

At that time, the P/B ratio of rubber prices in stock market got the peak as 10-20 times; also it was common to see the premium prices got increasing as eight to nine times.

=== High premium, stockholder and market speculation ===
Accomplished with the higher stock prices and stimulation of financial organizations, new rubber stocks were issued into market. Since January 1910, more than 10 kinds of new rubber stocks existed in the market. These stocks were increasing with the frantic market; at the same time, the newspapers posted a huge number of advertisements, showing the nice management of rubbers companies and good relationships with banks such as HSBC, SCB, also announcing that the famous social activists had joined into the board of directors.

By selling the stocks, these rubber companies also opened account at foreign banks in Shanghai. For example, the Chemor United Rubber Co. posted advertisement for funds at Deutsch-Asiatische Bank. Java Rubber Co. established account at Chartered Bank. Besides, Chinese native banks bogged down in this quagmire. Data shows the total of investments was 60 million Tael, in which the Chinese people held the 70%-80% of stocks. Some native banks not only lent money for investment, but also bought stocks by themselves. In addition, some banks also called loans from other banks. At the peak period, all kinds of people, including government officials, businessmen, and common employees joined into these investment activities.

=== Stock-market crashes and failure of government bailout ===
In the middle period of 1910, the United States adopted a policy to barrier the consumption of rubber. In June, the price of rubber dropped dramatically in the international market, which reached the price at nine shillings and three pence in the later July, then got a worse price at six shillings. This brought the decrease tendency in stock market. On July 21, 1910, three Chinese native banks Zhengyuan (正元), Yaokang (兆康), Qianyu (谦余) bankrupted, then five ones closed as follow.

At the same time, the Daotai (Mayor) of Shanghai Cai Naihuang (蔡乃煌) and the chairman of Shanghai Commerce Association Zhou Jinzhen (周金箴) arrived Ningbo and reported the situations to Zhang Renjun (张人骏, Liangjiang governor) and Cheng Dequan (程德全, Jiangsu governor). Zhang reported this to the center government. On July 27, Qing dynasty Government approved the loans from the foreign banks. On August 4, Cai signed a contrast of "Loans for keeping Shanghai's economy" with 9 foreign banks, in which the Shanghai government loaned 3.5 million Tael. Furthermore, Cai arranged 3 million Tael from Shanghai Customs (an official budget fund named "Shanghai Custom Treasury", 沪关库款), and saved them into Yuanfengrun (源丰润), Yishanyuan (义善源) banks and their sub-agents. After this attempts, the economy got back to a stable situation temporarily.

In September, the Qing Government wanted to take 1.9 million Tael from Shanghai Custom Treasury for repaying Boxer Indemnity. Based on the considerations of Shanghai's economic situation, Cai Naihuang requested the center government take 2 million Tael from Daqing Bank (大清银行), the national central bank as an advance payment. This request was sent into the Department of Treasury (度支部). However, Chen Bangrui (陈邦瑞), the vice minister of DOT had terrible relationship with Cai, and he asked Jiangsu Governor to appeal a dismissal of Cai. In this dismissal report, they considered Cai was intimidating the Qing government. After this, Cai reported the Grand Council and asked for a late payment, in which he kept emphasizing the importance of not drawing funds from Shanghai Custom Treasury. However, the Grand Council still considered this request as intimidation, and criticized Cai that he had to finish drawing in two months. Therefore, Shanghai Government had to ask funds of 2 million Tael from Fengrun and Yishanyuan Bank.

Due to Cai's drawing, accomplished the incident that the foreign banks suddenly refused the promissory note of 21 Chinese native banks in Shanghai on October 7, Fengrun bankrupted, which led to a chain reaction of six banks' bankrupts. Thus, the foreign banks stopped the loans and requested for debts. The loans suddenly decreased from 10 million Tael to 0.6 million in December. The Department of Treasury had to take 1 million Tael from national center bank to Shanghai. On December 11, Zhang Renjun, the Liangjiang governor asked 3 million loans from HSBC, Crédit Lyonnais, and Deutsch-Asiatische Bank, and used Jiangsu's Sale Taxes as the guarantee.

In the earlier 1910, 30 Chinese native banks closed. On March 21, Yishanyuan announced its bankrupt. Li Jingchu (李经楚), the major shareholder of Yishanyuan, also the nephew of Li Hongzhang, is the Vice Minister of Transportation and Manager of the Bank of Communications (BOC, in which Liang Shiyi is also a manager). He used the assets as collateral, loaning 2.87 million from the Bank of Communications to save Yishanyuan. In 1911, Sheng Xuanhuai was appointed as the Minister of Transportation. He began to check the accounts of the Bank of Communications for battling the influence of Liang Shiyi (梁士诒). Li had to return the loans from Yishanyuan, which led to a fact that Yishanyuan only had 7 thousands Tael on its total account in Shanghai. After the failed attempt of Yishanyuan's manager Ding Weifan (丁维藩), in which he asked loans from Shanghai Government but got refusal; on March 21, Yishanyuan bankrupted and left the debt of 14 million Tael.

Since Fengrun and Yishanyuan were huge banks and their sub-agents were all over the China, their bankrupts led to a panic among people in Beijing, Guangzhou, Chongqing and other main cities.

== Afterwards ==
=== Shanghai ===
In the earlier 1910, Shanghai totally had 91 native banks. Due to the influence of this crisis, 48 of them (53%) went bankrupt, with a loss of 19.33 million Tael. After this crisis, most rubber companies still kept their business, but the reputation had been ruined. Although they still attempted to find some solutions to attract stock-holders, the price of most rubber companies in the stock market had fallen under their face value.

=== Zhejiang areas ===
In Zhejiang Province, 18 famous native banks closed in Nanjing, Zhenjiang, Yangzhou, Suzhou, Hangzhou and Ningbo. Except for Suzhou, the other five cities' all financial organizations suffered a destructive attack and bankrupted completely.

=== Tianjing ===
In July 1910, Chunhuatai Bank (春华泰银号) closed down firstly. In next October, the sub-agent of Shanghai Fenghuirong Bank (上海源丰润) and others followed this tendency with 1 million debt. In March 1911, after Yishanyuan's bankrupt, not only the native banks, but the foreign banks such as Chartered Bank suffered huge losses.

=== Rubber market ===
Due to this crisis, the international rubber prices fell down below 5 shillings. After the outbreak of World War, rubber market was influenced by the shortage and problems of transportation, which led to a lower price of rubber. This situation bogged down until the late 1922.

== Legal consequences ==
After the rubber crisis the Qing government introduced legislation that taxed speculative profits at a rate of more than fifty percent, leading to the further bankruptcy of two dozen banks in Shanghai.

=== Qing Government ===
To a certain extent, this national economic crisis impacted the revenue of Qing Government. Under this pressure, the government had to regain the ownership of some railways, which were managed by local enterprises. After that, Railway Protection Movement (保路运动) broke out in Sichuan 1911. Because Qing Government had to bring Hubei Army to repress this movement, the Chinese Revolutionary Alliance was able to prepare for the Wuchang Uprising, the beginning of Xinhai Revolution.
