= Flight-to-quality =

Investment behavior

A flight-to-quality, or flight-to-safety, is a financial market phenomenon occurring when investors sell what they perceive to be higher-risk investments and purchase safer investments, such as gold and government bonds. This is considered a sign of fear in the marketplace, as investors seek less risk in exchange for lower profits.

Flight-to-quality is usually accompanied by an increase in demand for assets that are government-backed and a decline in demand for assets backed by private agents.

== Definition ==
More broadly, flight-to-quality refers to a sudden shift in investment behaviors in a period of financial turmoil whereby investors seek to sell assets perceived as risky and instead purchase safe assets. A defining feature of flight-to-quality is insufficient risk-taking by investors. While excessive risk-taking can be a source of financial turmoil, insufficient risk-taking can severely disrupt credit and other financial markets during a financial turmoil. Such a portfolio shift further exposes the financial sector to negative shocks. An increase in leverage and credit spread on all but the safest and most liquid assets may incur a sudden dry up in risky asset markets, which may lead to real effects on the economy.

A phenomenon that occurs with flight-to-quality is flight-to-liquidity. A flight-to-liquidity refers to an abrupt shift in large capital flows towards more liquid assets. One reason why the two appear together is that in most cases risky assets are also less liquid. Assets that are subject to the flight to quality pattern are also subject to flight to liquidity. For example, a U.S. Treasury bond is less risky and more liquid than a corporate bond. Thus, most theoretical studies that attempt to explain underlying mechanisms take both flight-to-quality and flight-to-liquidity into account.

== Mechanism ==
Flight-to-quality episodes are triggered by unusual and unexpected events. These events are rare but the list is longer than a few. The Penn Central Railroad’s default in 1970, a sudden stock market crash referred to as Black Monday, the Russian debt default and collapse of Long Term Capital Management in 1998, the 9/11 attack in 2001, and the subprime mortgage crisis in 2008, were all unusual and unexpected events that caught market participants by surprise. The initial effects of these events were a fall in asset prices and aggregate quantity of liquidity in financial market which deteriorated balance sheets of both borrowers and investors.

Worsening of initial impacts developed into a flight-to-quality pattern, as the unusual and unexpected features of the events made market participants more risk and uncertainty averse, incurring more aggressive reactions compared to responses during other shocks. Liquidation of assets and withdrawals from financial market were severe, which made a risky group of borrowers have difficulties rolling over their liabilities and financing new credits.

A recent development in theory explains various mechanisms which led to enhanced initial effects of a flight-to-quality pattern. These mechanisms follow from an observation that a flight-to-quality pattern involves a combination of market participants' weakening balance sheet and risk aversion of asset payoffs, extreme uncertainty aversion, and strategic or speculative behavior of liquid market participants.

A "balance sheet mechanism" focuses on institutional features of financial markets. It provides an explanation for feedback loop mechanisms between the asset prices and balance sheets, and investors' preference for liquidity. The idea is that if investors' balance sheets depend on asset prices under delegated investment management, then a negative asset price shock tightens the investors' balance sheets, forcing them to liquidate assets, and makes investors prefer more liquid and less risky assets. Forced liquidation and changes in investors' preferences further lower asset prices and deteriorate the balance sheets, amplifying the initial shock. Vayanos models how a relationship between fund managers and clients can lead to effective risk aversion when illiquidity risk rises due to asset price volatility. He and Krishnamurthy introduce principal–agent problem to a model to show how specialists’ capital investments are pro-cyclical. Brunnermeier and Pedersen model margin requirement and show how volatility of asset prices tightens the requirement that lead to asset sales.

An "information amplification mechanism" focuses on a role of investor's extreme uncertainty aversion. When an unusual and unexpected event incurs losses, investors find that they do not have a good understanding about the tail outcome that they are facing and treat the risk as Knightian uncertainty. An example is subprime mortgage crisis in 2008. Investors realized that they did not have good understanding about mortgage-backed securities which were newly adopted. Newly adopted financial innovation meant that market participants had only a short time to formulate valuation, and did not have enough history to refer to in their risk management and hedging models. Under Knightian uncertainty, investors respond by disengaging from risky activities and hoarding liquidity while reevaluating their investment models. They only take conservative approaches, investing on only safe and uncontingent claims, to protect themselves from worst-case scenarios related to the risk that they do not understand, which further deteriorates asset prices and financial market.

A model of strategic or speculative behaviors of liquid investors provides another mechanism that explains flight-to-quality phenomenon. Acharya et al show that during financial turmoil liquid banks in interbank loan markets do not lend their liquidity to illiquid banks, nor hoard liquidity for precautionary reasons, but, rather, hoard them to purchase assets at distress prices. Brunnermeier and Pedersen study strategic behaviors of liquid traders when they know that other traders need to liquidate their positions. The study shows that the strategic behaviors would lead to predatory pricing, which would lead the price of risky and illiquid assets to fall further than they would if price were based on risk consideration alone.

== Empirical studies ==
Since flight-to-quality phenomenon implies a shift in investing behavior towards some safe group of assets from risky assets, efforts to find evidence on flight-to-quality have been concentrated on analyzing widening yields or quantity changes between two assets. A number of studies find stronger negative association between stock and bond markets during a financial turmoil. Flight-to-quality is also observable within a safe group of assets. Longstaff finds a spread between Resolution Funding Corporation bonds, whose liabilities are guaranteed by Treasury, and US Treasury bonds increases when consumer confidence drops, money market mutual funds and Treasury buy backs increase. Krishnamurthy compares on-the-run and off-the-run treasury bonds to find higher spreads on off-the –run bonds are associated with higher spread between commercial paper and Treasury bonds. Beber et al make explicit distinction between flight-to-quality and flight-to-liquidity and find relative importance of liquidity over credit quality rises during flight-to-quality episodes. Gatev and Strahan find that the spread between treasury bills and high grade commercial paper increases, banks tend to experience inflow of deposits and decreased cost of funding. This suggests that banks tend to be seen as safe havens in periods of turmoil. However, data shows that during 1998 the flight-to-quality episodes worsening relative position of banks compared to the very safe assets.

== Real sector effects ==
During a flight-to-quality episode external financing becomes harder for lower quality borrowers or riskier projects. Investors faced with tightened balance sheet and increased risk and uncertainty aversion reduce their investment and shift their portfolio only towards safer projects and high quality borrowers. Tightening external financing for lower quality borrowers may extend to real consequences of output loss and higher unemployment, therefore exacerbate business cycle. A series of studies show that amount and composition of firm's external financing from bank loans are countercyclical during flight-to quality periods. Kashyap et al finds that quantity of commercial paper issuances of high quality firms increase relative to bank loans. Since lower quality firms lack external financing ability via commercial paper issuance, lower quality firms are likely to be deprived from financial resources. Gertler and Gilchrist find similar result of relative proportion of loans being increased to larger firms, and Oliner and Rudebusch find new loans made to safer projects are countercyclical during flight-to-quality episodes. Bernanke et al compare differences in performances between small and large firms during a flight-to-quality episode, and find evidence that the differences explain as much as one third of aggregate fluctuations.

== Policy implications ==
A moral hazard concern generally provides a rationale that government should not intervene in a financial crisis. The argument is that a market participant who expects government bailouts or emergency financing would engage in excessive risk taking. However, various government policy tools have been proposed to alleviate the effect of flight-to-quality phenomenon. The argument for government intervention is that flight-to-quality phenomenon is a result of insufficient risk taking generated by Knightian uncertainty. There is also an inefficiency issue generated by externality that supports rationale for prudential policy. The externality is generated when in presence of illiquid market, each firm forced to sell illiquid assets depresses prices for everyone else but does not take this effect into account in its decision-making. The externality also enables strategic and speculative behaviors of liquid investors.

Caballero and Krishnamurthy show that central bank acting as a lender of last resort would be effective when both balance sheet and information amplifier mechanisms are at work. For instance, a guarantee issuance by government or loans to distressed private sectors would sustain deteriorating asset prices, bring confidence back in financial market, and prevent fire sale of assets. Brock and Manski argue that government's guarantee on minimum returns on investment can restore investor's confidence when Knightian uncertainty is prevalent.

Acharya et al argue that the central bank's role as a lender of last resort can also support smooth functioning of interbank markets. The loan from the central bank to distressed banks would improve their outside option in bargaining. Thus less efficient asset sales would not be necessary and liquid banks would not be able to behave monopolistically. Brunnermeier and Pedersen propose short selling restrictions and trading halts to eliminate predatory behaviors of liquid traders.
