= Hyun-Song Shin =

South Korean economist (born 1959)

Shin Hyun-Song
- 신현송
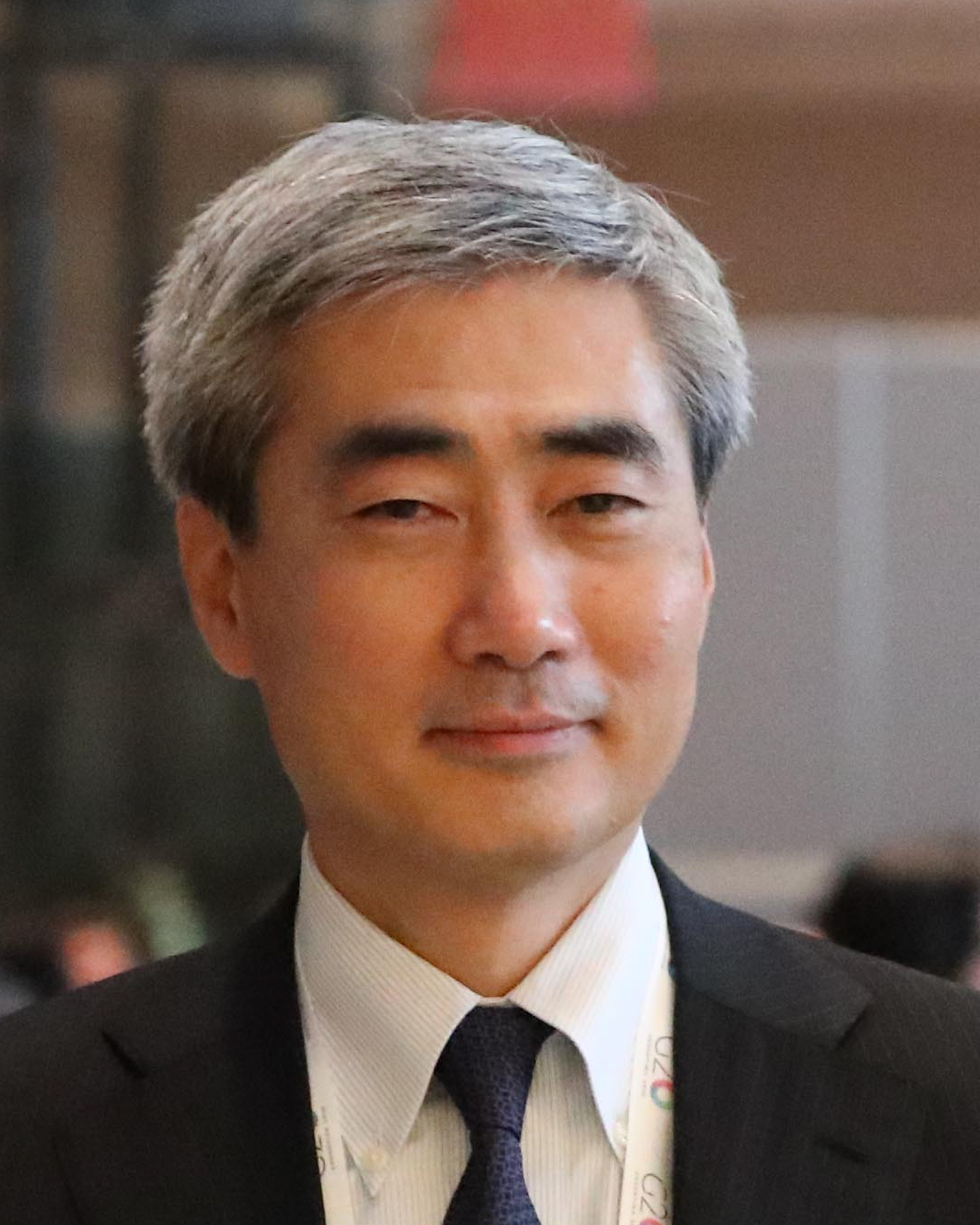
- Shin in 2018

28th Governor of the Bank of Korea
- Incumbent
- Assumed office 21 April 2026
- Appointed by: Lee Jae Myung
- Preceded by: Rhee Chang-yong

Personal details
- Born: 9 August 1959 (age 67) Daegu, South Korea
- Education: Magdalen College, Oxford (BA); Nuffield College, Oxford (MPhil, DPhil)

Academic background
- Doctoral advisor: James Mirrlees

Academic work
- Discipline: Economic theory Finance
- School or tradition: Neoclassical economics
- Institutions: Princeton University
- Notable ideas: Global games
- Website: Information at IDEAS / RePEc

Shin Hyun-song (Korean: 신현송; Hanja: 申鉉松; born 9 August 1959) is a South Korean economic theorist and financial economist who focuses on global games, currently serving as the 28th Governor of the Bank of Korea since April 21, 2026.

Previously, Shin was the Hughes-Rogers Professor of Economics at Princeton University since 2006, though he took a leave in December 2009 to advise South Korean President Lee Myung-bak on the international economy as well as help set the agenda for the G-20 Seoul summit in November 2010. Shin was the Economic Adviser and Head of Research of the Bank for International Settlements (BIS) from May 1, 2014 to March 2026.

== Education and early career ==
Shin obtained a BA (1985) in philosophy, politics and economics at Magdalen College, Oxford, and an MPhil (1987) and DPhil in economics from Nuffield College, Oxford. Shin became a research fellow in 1988 and tutorial fellow in 1990 at Magdalen College, Oxford.

In 1994 he moved to the University of Southampton, where he became a professor of economics. He moved back to Oxford in 1996 as a university lecturer in economics and faculty fellow in economics at Nuffield College. In 2000 he became a professor of finance at the London School of Economics. In 2006 he moved to Princeton University.

In addition to his academic positions, Shin served as an advisor to Bank of England (2000–2005) and is a member of the Financial Advisory Roundtable at the Federal Reserve Bank of New York and a panel member of the U.S. Monetary Policy Forum since 2007. He is a research fellow of the Centre for Economic Policy Research since 1998. Shin was the chairman of the editorial board of the Review of Economic Studies from 1999 to 2003. He collaborated with Isabel Schnabel, comparing the Bankruptcy of Lehman Brothers with the bankruptcy of Leendert Pieter de Neufville in 1763.

Shin was elected a Fellow of the Econometric Society elected in 2004 and of the European Economic Association in 2004. He was also elected a Fellow of the British Academy in 2005. He was awarded the R. K. Cho Economics Prize in 2009.

In December 2009, Shin was named chief advisor to President Lee Myung-bak on international finance. He played a major role in formulating South Korea's macroprudential policy and helped develop the agenda for the G-20 during Korea's presidency, which culminated in the 2010 G-20 Seoul summit on November 11–12, 2010.

In September 2013 the Basel, Switzerland–based Bank for International Settlements (BIS) announced that Shin would begin a five-year term as its Economic Adviser and Head of Research starting in May 2014. In that role he would also serve as a member of the BIS Executive Committee.^{,}

In 2023, Shin was elected to the American Academy of Arts and Sciences.^{,}

== Governor of the Bank of Korea ==
In March 2026, Shin was nominated by President Lee Jae Myung to serve as Governor of the Bank of Korea. On April 20, 2026, President Lee approved Shin’s appointment as governor following approval by the National Assembly.

On May 12, 2026, Shin became a member of the Board of Directors of the Bank for International Settlements.

== Research contribution ==
Global coordination games belong to a subfield of game theory that gained momentum in 1998 when he published an article with Stephen Morris. Shin and Morris considered a stylized currency crises model, in which traders observe the relevant fundamentals with small noise, and show that this leads to the selection of a unique equilibrium. This result is in stark contrast with models of complete information, which feature multiple equilibria.

In 2011 he won the second Financial Times annual essay contest on banking regulation sponsored by the International Centre for Financial Regulation. He wrote about how the G-20 major economies could increase financial stability with macroprudential regulations that "leans against the credit cycle" using examples from the UK, South Korea, and the United States. Specifically, he "advocated a global tax on non-core banking liabilities as the best way to deflate bubbles".

Shin argues that "financial firms systematically take more risk as asset prices rise", which means that the financial system's vulnerability "cannot be measured by price indicators like credit spreads or volatility. Instead, analysts should focus on quantities like the amount of assets on intermediary balance sheets and the liquidity and maturity mismatches between those assets and the liabilities used to fund them".

=== Risk and Liquidity ===
He is known for this 2010 book Risk and Liquidity which opens with a quote from an anonymous risk manager who says: "The value added of good risk management is that you can take more risks". He then says that financial risk is endogenous, due to the thinking expressed in this quote and makes an analogy with London's Millennium Bridge in which the instability was also endogenous. When the bridge lurched to the side, everyone adjusted their footing at exactly the same time, to avoid falling over, and this caused a synchronized oscillation.

=== Endogenous Risk ===
He is credited with coining the term endogenous risk, with his co-author Jon Danielsson which as opposed to exogenous risk, captures shocks to the financial system stemming from how financial system participants interact with each other, giving rise to internal mechanisms, such as feedback-loops and forced fire sales.

=== The Taper Tantrum ===
Martin Wolf credits him with coming up with the explanation for the huge global overreaction (called the "taper tantrum") to United States Federal Reserve chair Ben Bernanke's hint that he might taper quantitative easing in May 2013. Shin presented this theory at a conference on Asia at the Federal Reserve Bank of San Francisco in December 2013. Shin suggested that it was caused by the growth of demand for the private-sector bonds of emerging economies, and the resulting excess global liquidity.

== Sources ==
- Stephen Morris and Hyun Song Shin (1998), "Unique Equilibrium in a Model of Self-Fulfilling Currency Attacks", American Economic Review, 88 (3): 587–97.
