= Stephen Morris (economist) =

English economist (born 1963)

Stephen E. Morris
- Born: October 19, 1963 (age 62); England

Academic background
- Education: Cambridge University and Yale University
- Doctoral advisor: John Geanakoplos; Truman Bewley

Academic work
- Discipline: Economic theory, Game theory
- School or tradition: Neoclassical economics
- Institutions: Massachusetts Institute of Technology
- Notable ideas: global games, Bayes correlated equilibrium
- Website: Information at IDEAS / RePEc

Stephen Edward Morris is an economic theorist and game theorist especially known for his research in the field of global games. Since July 2019, he has been a professor of economics at the Massachusetts Institute of Technology. Prior to that he taught at Princeton, Yale, and the University of Pennsylvania. He was the editor of Econometrica for the period 2007–2011, and in 2019 served as president of the Econometric Society.

== Biography ==
Stephen Morris was born in 1963 in a small town called Weybridge in England. Morris's father was the senior UK diplomat Sir Willie Morris, who served as the UK's Ambassador to several countries. His mother was Ghislaine Morris.

Morris obtained a B.A. in mathematics and economics at Cambridge University in 1985. He worked as an economist for the government of Uganda for two years before choosing to continue his formal education at Yale University, and earned a Ph.D. in economics in 1991. He became an assistant professor at University of Pennsylvania in 1991 and an associate professor in 1996. In 1998 he moved to Yale as a full professor. In 2005 he became the Irving Fisher Professor of Economics at Yale. He moved to Princeton University in 2005, where he became the Alexander Stewart 1886 Professor of Economics in 2007. Since 2019, he is the Peter A. Diamond Professor in Economics of Economics at the Massachusetts Institute of Technology.

Morris is the founding editor of the BEPress Journals of Theoretical Economics and the editor of Econometrica for the period 2007–2011.

Morris is a Fellow of the Econometric Society since 2002 and was elected a member of the American Academy of Arts and Sciences in 2005. He held the John Simon Guggenheim Fellowship for 2005–2006 year and was the President of the Econometric Society in 2019. In 2021, he was elected member of the U. S. National Academy of Sciences.

== Research contribution ==
Global coordination games belong to a subfield of game theory which gained momentum with the article by Morris and Shin (1998). Stephen Morris and Hyun Song Shin considered a stylized currency crises model, in which traders observe the relevant fundamentals with small noise, and show that this leads to the selection of a unique equilibrium. This result is in stark contrast with models of complete information, which feature multiple equilibria.

Morris has also made important contributions to the theory of mechanism design. In his work with Dirk Bergemann on robust mechanism design, they relaxed common knowledge assumptions which were prevalent in the early mechanism design literature. By formulating the mechanism design problem more precisely, they showed that simple mechanisms arise endogenously. This provided a theoretical justification for the relatively simple auction design employed in practice when compared to the complexity of optimal auctions suggested by the early literature.

His two most recent contributions to the field of Economics are papers titled: 'Search, Information, and Prices' and 'Information, Market Power and Price Volatility,' published in the Journal of Political Economy and the RAND Journal of Economics respectively. Both of these papers were published in 2021.

== Sources ==
- Stephen Morris and Hyun Song Shin (1998), "Unique Equilibrium in a Model of Self-Fulfilling Currency Attacks," American Economic Review, 88 (3): 587–97.
- Dirk Bergemann and Stephen Morris (2005), "Robust Mechanism Design," Econometrica, 73 (6): 1771–1813
- MIT Economics (2021), "People: Stephen Morris"
