= MIT Department of Economics =

Academic department at the Massachusetts Institute of Technology

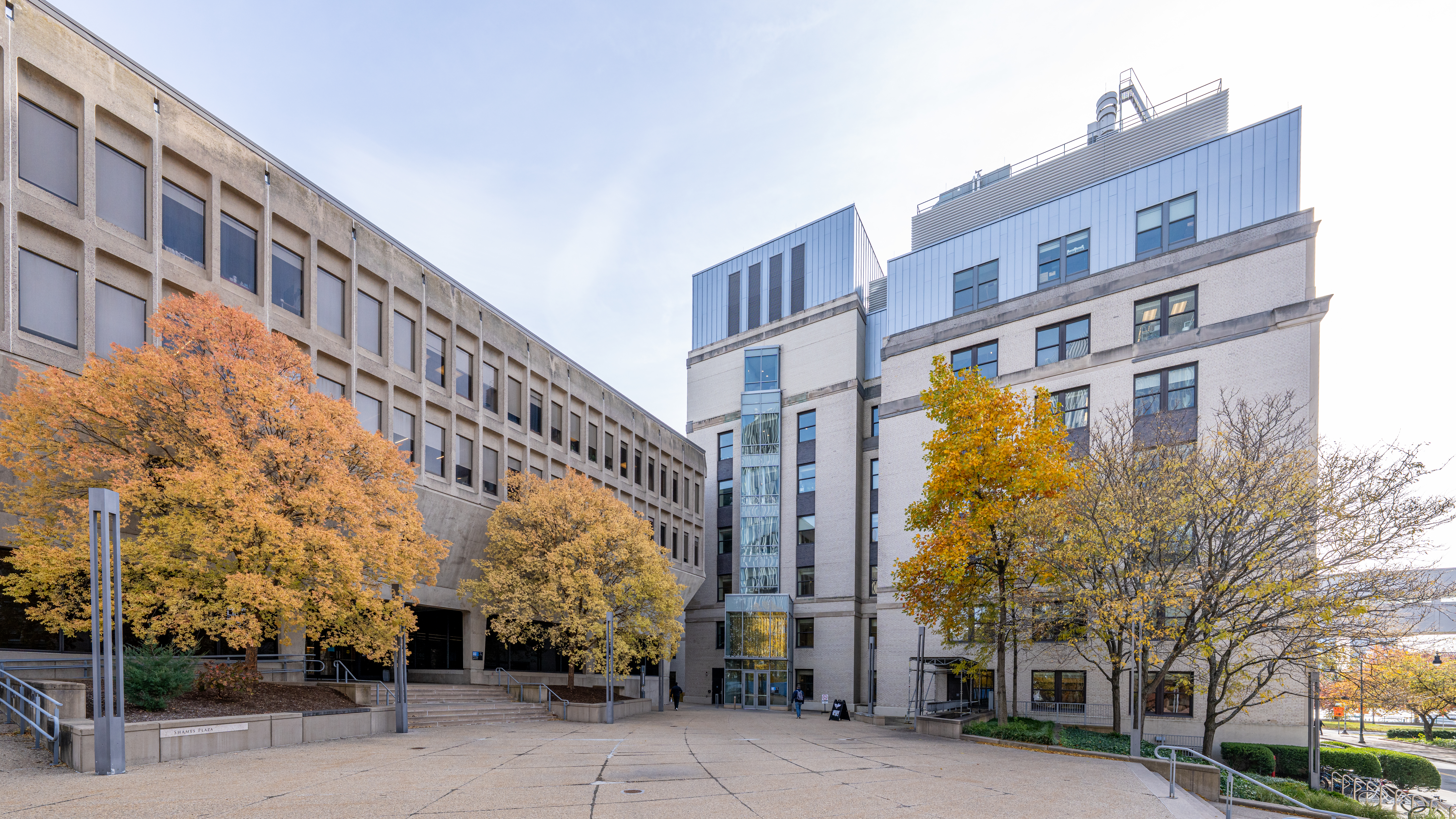
Morris and Sophie Chang Building (Building E52)

The MIT Department of Economics is a department of the Massachusetts Institute of Technology in Cambridge, Massachusetts.

Undergraduate studies in economics were introduced in the 19th century by institute president Francis Amasa Walker, while the department's Ph.D. program was introduced in 1941. In 2020, the department launched a master's program in Data, Economics, and Design of Policy, which is jointly run with the Abdul Latif Jameel Poverty Action Lab. By 2020, the department has the second highest number of Ph.D. alumni who received the Nobel Prize in Economics in the world (12) only behind Harvard Economics (13) and ahead of UChicago Economics (9). Nine out of 18 Clark medalists since 1999 received Ph.D. degrees from the department.

== History ==
In the 1890s, economists including Francis Amasa Walker and Davis Rich Dewey taught courses in economics to the undergraduate students. It was known as the Department of Economics and Social Sciences (1932). In 1937, the department established a graduate program, while in 1941, it established a Ph.D. program. In the 1950s and the 1960s, the department expanded its graduate program. In these years, the program became more quantitatively oriented and emphasized technical training. Approximately 25 students enrolled each year. In the 1970s, the first Black American graduate students joined the program as part of a desegregation program.

== Prominent faculty ==
- Paul Samuelson (1940–2009), Nobel Prize, 1970
- Franco Modigliani (1962–2003), Nobel Prize, 1985
- John Williamson (1967–1980), originator of the 'Washington Consensus'
- Robert Solow, (1960–1979) Nobel Prize, 1987
- Stanley Fischer, (1977–1988), Vice-Chairman of the US Federal Reserve, Governor of Bank of Israel
- Robert F. Engle, (1969-1977), Nobel Prize, 2003
- Daniel McFadden, (1977–1991), Nobel Prize, 2000
- George P. Shultz, (1948–1957), Former Secretary of State, Secretary of Treasury, Secretary of Labor
- Myron S. Scholes (1968–1973), Nobel prize in 1997 for the Black-Scholes equation
- Rudi Dornbusch (1975–2002), known for the Overshooting Model

== Nobel Laureates ==
Among the department's past and current faculty and alumni are several recipients of the Nobel Prize in Economics:

- Daron Acemoglu and Simon Johnson, 2024
- Joshua Angrist, 2021
- Esther Duflo (Ph.D., 1999) and Abhijit Banerjee, 2019
- William Nordhaus, 2018
- Bengt Holmstrom, 2016
- Jean Tirole, 2014
- Robert J. Shiller, 2013
- Peter A. Diamond, 2010
- Oliver E. Williamson, 2009
- Paul Krugman (Ph.D., 1977), 2008
- Eric Maskin, 2007
- Edmund Phelps, 2006
- Robert J. Aumann, 2005
- Robert F. Engle, 2003
- George Akerlof (Ph.D., 1966) and Joseph Stiglitz (Ph.D., 1967), 2001
- Daniel McFadden, 2000
- Robert Mundell (Ph.D., 1956), 1999
- Amartya Sen, 1998
- Robert C. Merton (Ph.D, 1970), 1997
- Robert Solow, 1987
- Franco Modigliani, 1985
- Lawrence Klein (Ph.D., 1944), 1980
- Paul Samuelson, 1970

== Current Faculty ==
=== Professors ===
- Alberto Abadie
- Isaiah Andrews
- Daron Acemoglu
- George-Marios Angeletos
- Joshua Angrist
- David Autor
- Abhijit Banerjee
- Ricardo J. Caballero
- Victor Chernozhukov
- Arnaud Costinot
- Esther Duflo
- Glenn Ellison [past Department Head]
- Amy Finkelstein
- Drew Fudenberg
- Robert S. Gibbons
- Jonathan Gruber [current Department Head]
- Jeffrey Harris
- Bengt R. Holmström [past Department Head]
- Whitney K. Newey
- Benjamin Olken
- Parag Pathak
- James M. Poterba [past Department Head]
- Drazen Prelec
- Nancy Rose [past Department Head]
- Robert M. Townsend
- John Van Reenen
- Iván Werning
- Michael Whinston

=== Associate Professors ===
- Anna Mikusheva

=== Professors Emeriti ===
- Sidney Alexander
- Olivier Blanchard
- Richard S. Eckaus [past Department Head]
- Peter A. Diamond [past Department Head]
- Stanley Fischer [past Department Head]
- Paul Joskow [past Department Head]
- Richard L. Schmalensee
- Robert Solow
- Peter Temin [past Department Head]

== Affiliated Faculty ==
- Mathias Dewatripont
- Ernst Fehr
- Jean Tirole

== Former Faculty ==
- Susan Athey (Ph.D., Stanford) John Bates Clark Medal, 2007
- E. Cary Brown (Ph.D., Harvard) Professor of Economics, Emeritus
- Evsey Domar (Ph.D., Harvard)
- Rudi Dornbusch (Ph.D., Chicago) Ford International Professor, International Economics
- Robert F. Engle (Ph.D., Cornell)
- Stanley Fischer (Ph.D., MIT)
- Charles P. Kindleberger (Ph.D., Columbia) Ford International Professor of Economics, Emeritus
- Edwin Kuh (Ph.D., Harvard)
- Paul Krugman (Ph.D., MIT) John Bates Clark Medal, 1991
- Eric Maskin (Ph.D., Harvard)
- Daniel McFadden (Ph.D., Minnesota)
- Franco Modigliani (D.Jur., Rome and D.Soc.Sci., The New School for Social Research) Institute Professor Emeritus; Professor of Finance & Economics
- George P. Shultz (Ph.D., MIT)
- Hal Varian (Ph.D., Berkeley)

== Notable alumni ==
- Lawrence R. Klein (Ph.D., 1944) John Bates Clark Medalist, 1959; president of the Econometric Society, 1960; president of the American Economic Association, 1977; Laureate of the Sveriges Riksbank Prize in Economic Sciences in Memory of Alfred Nobel, 1980
- Margaret Garritsen de Vries (Ph.D., 1946) Carolyn Shaw Bell Award Recipient, 2002
- George P. Shultz (Ph.D., 1949) Distinguished Fellow of the American Economic Association, 2004
- Ronald W. Jones (Ph.D., 1956) Distinguished Fellow of the American Economic Association, 2009
- William Nordhaus (Ph.D., 1967), Council of Economic Advisers 1977 - 1979
- Mario Draghi (Ph.D., 1976) Governor of the Banca d'Italia, chairman of the Financial Stability Forum, president of the European Central Bank
- Robert A. Mundell (Ph.D., 1956) Distinguished Fellow of the American Economic Association, 1996; Laureate of the Sveriges Riksbank Prize in Economic Sciences in Memory of Alfred Nobel, 1999
- Peter A. Diamond (Ph.D., 1963) president of the Econometric Society, 1991; president of the American Economic Association, 2003; Laureate of the Sveriges Riksbank Prize in Economic Sciences in Memory of Alfred Nobel, 2010
- Riccardo Faini, (PhD), former head of the Economic and Financial Analysis Service of the Italian Ministry of Treasury
- George A. Akerlof (Ph.D., 1966) Laureate of the Sveriges Riksbank Prize in Economic Sciences in Memory of Alfred Nobel, 2001; president of the American Economic Association, 2006
- Joseph E. Stiglitz (Ph.D., 1966) John Bates Clark Medalist, 1979; Laureate of the Sveriges Riksbank Prize in Economic Sciences in Memory of Alfred Nobel, 2001
- Jagdish N. Bhagwati (Ph.D., 1967) Distinguished Fellow of the American Economic Association, 2003
- Robert E. Hall (Ph.D., 1967) president of the American Economic Association, 2010
- William D. Nordhaus (Ph.D., 1967) Member of the Council of Economic Advisers, 1977–1979; Distinguished Fellow of the American Economic Association, 2004; president of the American Economic Association, 2014; Laureate of the Sveriges Riksbank Prize in Economic Sciences in Memory of Alfred Nobel, 2018
- Avinash K. Dixit (Ph.D., 1968) president of the Econometric Society, 2001; president of the American Economic Association, 2008
- Robert J. Gordon (Ph.D., 1967) Distinguished Fellow of the American Economic Association, 2014
- Michael Rothschild, (Ph.D., 1968) Distinguished Fellow of the American Economic Association, 2005
- Stanley Fischer (Ph.D., 1969) Vice-Chairman of the US Federal Reserve, Governor of the Bank of Israel; Distinguished Fellow of the American Economic Association, 2013
- Robert C. Merton (Ph.D., 1970) president of the American Finance Association, 1986; Laureate of the Sveriges Riksbank Prize in Economic Sciences in Memory of Alfred Nobel, 1997
- Tommaso Padoa-Schioppa, (M.Sc. 1970), European Central Bank executive board 1998-2005, former Italian minister of economy and finance
- Jeremy J. Siegel (Ph.D., 1971) financial markets guru
- Martin Neil Baily (Ph.D., 1972) Chairman of the Council of Economic Advisers, 1999–2001
- Alan S. Blinder (Ph.D., 1971) Distinguished Fellow of the American Economic Association, 2011
- Robert J. Shiller (Ph.D., 1972) Fellow of the American Finance Association, 2006; Laureate of the Sveriges Riksbank Prize in Economic Sciences in Memory of Alfred Nobel, 2013
- Lawrence Summers (B.S., 1975) Secretary of the Treasury, 1999–2001
- Mario Draghi (Ph.D., 1976) president of the European Central Bank 2011-, Governor of the Banca d'Italia, Chairman of the Financial Stability Forum
- Paul R. Krugman (Ph.D., 1977) Member of the Council of Economic Advisers, 1982–1983; John Bates Clark Medalist, 1991; Laureate of the Sveriges Riksbank Prize in Economic Sciences in Memory of Alfred Nobel, 2008
- Lucas Papademos (Ph.D., 1977) vice president of the European Central Bank, 2002-
- Ben S. Bernanke (Ph.D., 1979) Chairman of the Federal Reserve, 2006-2014
- Frederic S. Mishkin (B.S., 1973, Ph.D., 1976) Member of the Federal Reserve Board of Governors, 2006-2008
- Kenneth S. Rogoff (Ph.D., 1980) IMF chief economist
- Jean Tirole (Ph.D., 1981) president of the Econometric Society, 1998; president of the European Economic Association, 2001; Laureate of the Sveriges Riksbank Prize in Economic Sciences in Memory of Alfred Nobel, 2014
- N. Gregory Mankiw (Ph.D., 1984) Chairman of the Council of Economic Advisers, 2003–2005
- Andrei Shleifer (Ph.D., 1986) John Bates Clark Medalist, 1999
- Matthew Rabin (Ph.D., 1989) John Bates Clark Medalist, 2001
- Andrew Samwick (Ph.D., 1993) Member of the Council of Economic Advisers, 2003–2004
- Judith Chevalier (Ph.D., 1993) Elaine Bennett Research Prize recipient, 1998
- Steven D. Levitt (Ph.D., 1994) John Bates Clark Medalist, 2003; co-author of Freakonomics
- Emmanuel Saez (Ph.D., 1999) John Bates Clark Medalist, 2009
- Esther Duflo (Ph.D. 1999), John Bates Clark Medalist, 2010; Elaine Bennett Research Prize recipient, 2002; Laureate of the Sveriges Riksbank Prize in Economic Sciences in Memory of Alfred Nobel, 2019; co-author Poor Economics
- Jonathan Levin (Ph.D., 1999) John Bates Clark Medalist, 2011
- Amy Finkelstein (Ph.D., 2001) John Bates Clark Medalist, 2012; Elaine Bennett Research Prize recipient, 2008
