= Rebecca Diamond (economist) =

American economist

- Education: Yale College; Harvard University
- Awards: Elaine Bennett Research Prize, 2022
- Scientific career
- Fields: Economics
- Workplaces: Harvard University
- Doctoral advisors: Lawrence F. Katz, Edward Glaeser, Ariel Pakes
- Website: https://www.rebecca-diamond.com/

Rebecca Diamond is the Martin Feldstein Professor of Economics at Harvard University and an associate editor of Econometrica and American Economic Journal: Applied Economics. Her research areas include urban economics and labor economics.

In 2022, she was awarded the Elaine Bennett Research Prize.

== Biography ==
Diamond is the daughter of Elizabeth Cammack Diamond and Douglas Diamond, recipient of the 2022 Nobel Memorial Prize in Economic Sciences.

She graduated from Yale University in 2007 with a BS in Physics and Economics & Mathematics, worked for a year as an analyst for Goldman Sachs Asset Management, and then began graduate study at Harvard University. She earned an MA in economics in 2011 and a PhD in economics in 2013, and had been at Stanford University until 2025 when she moved to Harvard University.

== Research ==
Diamond's research focuses on topics in housing and inequality, including gender gaps in gig work, affordable housing development, and the geography of consumption inequality. Her work combines theoretical modeling with empirical analysis using new datasets, and often involves the connections between housing markets and labor markets. In work receiving media coverage, she studied a rent control policy implemented in San Francisco in 1994, finding that this policy reduced the amount of rental housing eligible for the policy as landlords sold rent-controlled apartments for condominium-conversions and replaced rent-controlled apartments with new buildings not covered by the policy.

=== Selected works ===
- Diamond, Rebecca. "The determinants and welfare implications of US workers' diverging location choices by skill: 1980-2000." American Economic Review 106, no. 3 (2016): 479–524.
- Allcott, Hunt, Rebecca Diamond, Jean-Pierre Dubé, Jessie Handbury, Ilya Rahkovsky, and Molly Schnell. "Food deserts and the causes of nutritional inequality." The Quarterly Journal of Economics 134, no. 4 (2019): 1793–1844.
- Cook, Cody, Rebecca Diamond, Jonathan V. Hall, John A. List, and Paul Oyer. "The gender earnings gap in the gig economy: Evidence from over a million rideshare drivers." The Review of Economic Studies 88, no. 5 (2021): 2210–2238.
- Diamond, Rebecca, Tim McQuade, and Franklin Qian. "The effects of rent control expansion on tenants, landlords, and inequality: Evidence from San Francisco." American Economic Review 109, no. 9 (2019): 3365–94.
- Diamond, Rebecca, and Tim McQuade. "Who wants affordable housing in their backyard? An equilibrium analysis of low-income property development." Journal of Political Economy 127, no. 3 (2019): 1063–1117.
