= Journal of Applied Economics =

- Discipline: Applied economics
- Language: English

Publication details
- History: 1998-present
- Publisher: Routledge on behalf of the Universidad del CEMA (Argentina)
- Frequency: Continuous
- Impact factor: 0.375 (2017)

Standard abbreviations
- ISO 4: J. Appl. Econ.

Indexing
- ISSN: 1514-0326 (print); 1667-6726 (web)
- OCLC no.: 60637830

Links
- Journal homepage; Online access; Online archive

The Journal of Applied Economics is a peer-reviewed open-access academic journal established in 1998 that covers applied issues in micro- and macroeconomics, including industrial organization, international economics, labor economics, finance, money and banking, growth, public finance, political economy, law and economics, and environmental economics.

== History ==
The journal was established in 1998 by the Universidad del CEMA; the online version was published by Elsevier on their behalf from 2009 to 2017. In 2018 the journal was bought by Routledge who converted it to a fully open-access journal.

== Editors ==
The founding editor-in-chief was Carlos Alfredo Rodríguez, the current editors are Germán Coloma, Mariana Conte Grand, and Jorge M. Streb (Universidad del CEMA).

== Abstracting and indexing ==
The journal is abstracted and indexed in:

- ABI/INFORM
- EBSCO databases
- EconLit
- International Bibliography of the Social Sciences
- Scopus (2006-2017)
- Social Sciences Citation Index

According to the Journal Citation Reports, the journal has a 2017 impact factor of 0.375.
