= Elaine Bennett =

American economist

- Born: January 1, 1951
- Died: May 25, 1995 (aged 44); Monterey, California
- Education: University of Florida (BS) Florida Atlantic University (MA) Northwestern University (PhD)
- Occupations: Economist, professor

Elaine Bennett was an American economist. The American Economic Association has awarded the Elaine Bennett Research Prize annually in her honor since 1998.

== Career ==
Bennett graduated from Northwestern University with a PhD in economics in 1980.

Bennett taught economics at the University of Buffalo, University of Kansas, Virginia Tech, and UCLA. She specialized in experimental economics, and published numerous studies within the field.

Bennett was married to fellow UCLA professor William Zame. She died in 1995 in Monterey.

== Elaine Bennett Research Prize ==
Beginning in 1998, the American Economic Association awarded the prize biannually to a female economist who had earned her PhD within the preceding ten years. The prize has been awarded annually since 2022.
