= Isaiah Andrews =

American economist

Isaiah Smith Andrews
- Born: 1986 (age 39–40)

Academic background
- Education: Yale University (BA); Massachusetts Institute of Technology (PhD)
- Doctoral advisor: Anna Mikusheva

Academic work
- Discipline: Econometrics
- Institutions: Harvard University; Massachusetts Institute of Technology; Harvard Society of Fellows
- Awards: 2020 MacArthur Fellow; 2021 John Bates Clark Medal
- Website: https://scholar.harvard.edu/iandrews/

Isaiah Andrews (born 1986) is an American economist who is a professor of economics at the Massachusetts Institute of Technology and a research associate of the National Bureau of Economic Research. He is also a co-editor of the American Economic Review. In 2018, The Economist named him one of the 8 "best young economists of the decade." He was named a MacArthur Fellow in 2020 and in 2021, the American Economic Association awarded him the John Bates Clark Medal.

== Education and early life ==
Andrews grew up in Brookline, Massachusetts, the son of Yale-educated economists Marcellus Andrews and Cheryl Smith. He graduated from Yale University in 2009 with a degree in math and economics and completed a doctorate in economics at the Massachusetts Institute of Technology in 2014, where his dissertation advisor was Anna Mikusheva.

== Career ==
Andrews was the Silverman (1968) Family Career Assistant Professor and an associate professor at the Massachusetts Institute of Technology from 2016 to 2018, when he joined the faculty at Harvard. In 2023, he returned to MIT as a professor.

After his MacArthur win, Andrews, who is Black and gay, commented, “I hope that my getting this grant will help to demonstrate and show that there is room for success from a wide variety of folks in the economics profession.”

He was elected a fellow of the Econometric Society in 2020.

=== Research ===
Much of Andrew's research is in the field of econometrics, and concerns instrumental variables. Instrumental variables are variables that affect one part of a co-determined system without affecting another part of the same system. For this type of estimation to be effective, an instrumental variable must satisfy the relevance condition, that is, it must affect one part of the system, and it must satisfy the exclusion restriction, that is, it must not affect the other part of the system. Andrews' research concerns situations in which either the relevance condition or the exclusion restriction hold only weakly. Together with Mikusheva, he has studied the properties of weak instruments in estimating dynamic stochastic general equilibrium models and other economic models that employ nonlinear Generalized Method of Moments statistics models. They have proposed methods to more accurately test hypotheses and construct confidence intervals under these statistical conditions. Together with Gentzkow and Shapiro, he has developed a measure of the potential bias in estimators due to violations of the exclusion restriction (sensitivity). Together with Kasy, he has developed a method to correct for publication bias in replication studies and meta-analyses.

==== Selected works ====
- Andrews, Isaiah, Matthew Gentzkow, and Jesse M. Shapiro. "Measuring the sensitivity of parameter estimates to estimation moments." The Quarterly Journal of Economics 132, no. 4 (2017): 1553–1592.
- Andrews, Isaiah, and Maximilian Kasy. "Identification of and correction for publication bias." American Economic Review 109, no. 8 (2019): 2766–94.
- Andrews, Isaiah, James H. Stock, and Liyang Sun. "Weak instruments in instrumental variables regression: Theory and practice." Annual Review of Economics 11 (2019): 727–753.
- Andrews, Isaiah, and Anna Mikusheva. "Maximum likelihood inference in weakly identified dynamic stochastic general equilibrium models." Quantitative Economics 6, no. 1 (2015): 123–152.
- Andrews, Isaiah. "Conditional linear combination tests for weakly identified models." Econometrica 84, no. 6 (2016): 2155–2182.
