= Ludwig Straub =

German economist

- Born: August 8, 1987 (age 39); Germany

Academic background
- Education: Massachusetts Institute of Technology (PhD); Trinity College, Cambridge (MASt, Part III); LMU Munich (B.Sc.)
- Doctoral advisor: Ivan Werning

Academic work
- Discipline: Macroeconomics; International economics
- Institutions: Harvard University
- Notable ideas: Heterogenous agent New Keynesian macroeconomics
- Awards: John Bates Clark Medal (2026); Sloan Research Fellowship (2024); AQR Young Researcher Prize (2022)
- Website: scholar.harvard.edu/straub

Ludwig Straub (born August 8, 1987) is a German economist who has been a professor of economics at Harvard University since 2024. His research focuses on macroeconomics, particularly the role of household heterogeneity in macroeconomic dynamics.

Born in Germany, Straub received a B.Sc. in physics from LMU Munich, before completing Part III of the Mathematical Tripos at Trinity College, Cambridge. He received a PhD in economics from the Massachusetts Institute of Technology in 2018, where his doctoral advisor was Ivan Werning.

From 2018 to 2019, Straub was a postdoctoral fellow at Harvard University, where he became an assistant professor in 2019. He became an associate professor at Harvard in 2023, and a full professor of economics in 2024.

Straub has been a faculty research fellow at the National Bureau of Economic Research since 2019, a research associate in macroeconomics and finance at the CEPR since 2022, and a member of CESifo since 2019. In 2026, he was awarded the John Bates Clark Medal, for his contributions to the incorporation of agent heterogeneity into macroeconomic modelling.

== Selected publications ==
- Auclert, Adrien; Rognlie, Matthew; Straub, Ludwig (2024). "The Intertemporal Keynesian Cross". Journal of Political Economy. 132 (12).
- Auclert, Adrien; Rigato, Rodolfo; Rognlie, Matthew; Straub, Ludwig (2024). "New Pricing Models, Same Old Phillips Curves?". The Quarterly Journal of Economics. 139 (1).
- Guerrieri, Veronica; Lorenzoni, Guido; Straub, Ludwig; Werning, Iván (2022). "Macroeconomic Implications of COVID-19: Can Negative Supply Shocks Cause Demand Shortages?". American Economic Review. 112 (5).
- Auclert, Adrien; Bardóczy, Bence; Rognlie, Matthew; Straub, Ludwig (2021). "Using the Sequence Space to Solve and Estimate Heterogeneous-Agent Models". Econometrica. 89 (5).
- Mian, Atif; Straub, Ludwig; Sufi, Amir (2021). "Indebted Demand". The Quarterly Journal of Economics. 136 (4).
- Straub, Ludwig; Werning, Iván (2020). "Positive Long-Run Capital Taxation: Chamley-Judd Revisited". American Economic Review. 110 (1).
