= Derek Neal =

American labor economist

- Education: University of Virginia
- Known for: Research on racial wage inequality and education accountability systems
- Awards: Alfred P. Sloan Research Fellow (1998); Fellow, Society of Labor Economists (2008); H. Gregg Lewis Prize (2000)
- Scientific career
- Fields: Labor economics, education economics
- Workplaces: University of Chicago

Derek Neal is an American labor economist and the William C. Norby Professor in the Kenneth C. Griffin Department of Economics at the University of Chicago. His research concerns labor economics, racial inequality, education policy, and criminal justice.

== Education ==
Neal received his Ph.D. in Economics from the University of Virginia in 1992 and earned his M.A. in Economics from the same institution in 1987.

== Academic career ==
Neal joined the University of Chicago faculty in 1991. He has held appointments as Assistant Professor, Associate Professor, and Professor, and in 2022 was named William C. Norby Professor in the Kenneth C. Griffin Department of Economics. He is affiliated with the National Bureau of Economic Research.

Neal has served as Editor-in-Chief of the Journal of Labor Economics (2001–2007) and as Editor of the Journal of Political Economy (2008–2014).

== Publications ==
=== Books ===
- Information, Incentives, and Education Policy (Harvard University Press, 2018) ISBN 9780674050907

=== Selected papers ===
- Neal, Derek (1995). "Industry-Specific Human Capital: Evidence from Displaced Workers". Journal of Labor Economics. 13 (4): 653–677. ISSN 0734-306X.
- Neal, Derek (1999). "The Complexity of Job Mobility among Young Men". Journal of Labor Economics. 17 (2): 237–261. doi:10.1086/209919.
- Neal, Derek A.; Johnson, William R. (1996). "The Role of Premarket Factors in Black-White Wage Differences". Journal of Political Economy. 104 (5): 869–895. doi:10.1086/262045.
- Barlevy, Gadi; Neal, Derek (2012). "Pay for Percentile". American Economic Review. 102 (5): 1805–1831. doi:10.1257/aer.102.5.1805.

== Honors ==
- Alfred P. Sloan Research Fellow (1998).
- President, Midwest Economics Association (2009).
- Fellow, Society of Labor Economists (2008).
- H. Gregg Lewis Prize (2000).
- Quantrell Award for Excellence in Undergraduate Teaching (2016).
