= Franklin M. Fisher =

American economist (1934–2019)

- Born: December 13, 1934; New York City, U.S.
- Died: April 29, 2019 (aged 84); Belmont, Massachusetts, U.S.

Academic background
- Education: Harvard University (BA, PhD)
- Thesis: A Priori Information and Time Series Analysis.
- Doctoral advisor: John R. Meyer

Academic work
- Discipline: Industrial organization Microeconomics
- Institutions: Massachusetts Institute of Technology; National Bureau of Economic Research
- Doctoral students: Stanley Fischer; Michael Rothschild; Vincent Crawford; Richard L. Schmalensee; Charles F. Manski; Mark J. Machina; Douglas Bernheim; Michael Whinston; Nancy Rose; Robert W. Vishny; Andrei Shleifer
- Notable ideas: Work in antitrust economics, industrial organization, microeconomics, and econometrics
- Awards: John Bates Clark Medal (1973)

Franklin Marvin Fisher (December 13, 1934 – April 29, 2019) was an American economist. He taught economics at the Massachusetts Institute of Technology from 1960 to 2004.

== Biography ==
Fisher attended Harvard University, where he was inducted into Phi Beta Kappa in 1955 and received a Bachelor of Arts degree (summa cum laude) in 1956, followed by a Master's degree in 1957 and a Ph.D. in Economics from Harvard in 1960. His doctoral thesis was entitled A Priori Information and Time Series Analysis.

Fisher married Ellen Paradise Fisher in 1958. They had three children and eight grandchildren.

He was Teaching Fellow at Harvard from 1956 to 1957, Junior Fellow of the Society of Fellows at Harvard (1957–59), Assistant Professor of Economics at the University of Chicago (1959–60), Assistant Professor of Economics at MIT (1960–62), Associate Professor of Economics at MIT (1962–65), and Professor of Economics at MIT from 1965 to 2004. He retired as the Jane Berkowitz Carlton and Dennis William Carlton Professor of Microeconomics, Emeritus at MIT. He was a director of the National Bureau of Economic Research starting in 1989.

Fisher's fields of specialization within economics were industrial organization, microeconomics, and econometrics. He wrote extensively in the area of antitrust economics. He served as an expert witness in matters involving antitrust, contract disputes, valuation, damages, and trademark infringement for many years. He was the chief economic witness for IBM in its antitrust confrontation with the United States Department of Justice, a case the Government dropped in 1982 after 13 years. He served in a similar role on behalf of the United States Department of Justice in the case of United States v. Microsoft.

Fisher died on April 29, 2019, in Belmont, Massachusetts from complications of Alzheimer's disease. He was 84.

== Publications ==
Fisher was the author or co-author of hundreds of scholarly articles and many books. He wrote books addressing antitrust issues. In 1983, he co-authored Folded, Spindled and Mutilated: Economic Analysis and U.S. vs. IBM. The book is about the antitrust case U.S. vs. IBM, in which Fisher was the lead expert economist for the defense. In 1985, he edited Antitrust and Regulation: Essays in Memory of John J. McGowan, which contains original essays by economists and lawyers addressing important aspects of antitrust and regulation.

He wrote a monograph sponsored by the Econometric Society on the economic theory of general equilibria and disequilibria:

- — (1983). Disequilibrium foundations of equilibrium economics. Econometric Society Monographs (1989 paperback ed.). New York: Cambridge University Press. p. 248. ISBN 978-0-521-37856-7.

== Awards ==
Fisher received the John Bates Clark Medal in 1973. He had been a fellow of the Econometric Society since 1963, and from 1968 to 1977 he was the editor of Econometrica, Society's journal. He was President of the Econometric Society in 1979. He was also a member of the American Economic Association. He had been a fellow of the American Academy of Arts and Sciences since 1969.
