= Sharon Oster =

American economist (1948–2022)

Sharon M. Oster
- Born: September 3, 1948; Bethpage, New York, U.S.
- Died: June 10, 2022 (aged 73); New Haven, Connecticut, U.S.
- Education: Hofstra College; Harvard University
- Spouse: Ray Fair (m. 1977)
- Children: 3, including Emily
- Awards: Honorary Doctor of Letters, Hofstra University, 2001; Carolyn Shaw Bell Award, 2011
- Scientific career
- Fields: Economics
- Workplaces: Yale University
- Website: http://som.yale.edu/sharon-m-oster

Sharon Monica Oster (September 3, 1948 – June 10, 2022) was an American economist. She was the Frederic D. Wolfe Professor Emerita of Management and Entrepreneurship and the dean of Yale School of Management, where she was the first woman to receive tenure, and the first female dean. She was widely known as an economist focusing on business strategy and non-profit organization management.

== Early life and education ==
Oster was born in 1948 at Bethpage, New York. She received her undergraduate degree from Hofstra University in 1970 and her Ph.D. in economics from Harvard in 1974.

== Career ==
Oster spent her 43-year professional career as a professor and administrator at Yale University. Upon receiving her Ph.D. from Harvard in 1974, Oster joined the faculty of the Yale Economics Department, where she primarily taught undergraduates at Yale College. In 1982, she moved to the faculty of the Yale School of Management, where she earned tenure in 1983, as the first woman to do so, and in 1992 was named as the Frederic D. Wolfe Professor of Management and Entrepreneurship. From 2008 to 2011, Oster served as dean of the Yale School of Management, becoming its first female dean. In May 2018, she retired from the Yale School of Management faculty.

Oster took a $100,000 pay cut from her yearly salary as the dean of the Yale School of Management in 2009 to fund internships for students. The Sharon Oster Professorship, an endowed chair in economics, was announced in 2018.

Oster wrote, co-wrote, or edited five academic books, including Modern Competitive Analysis (1990. revised 1993 and 1999) and Strategic Management of Nonprofits (1995). She also published over 40 academic articles on topics including regulatory issues, applied industrial organization, and labor economics, as well as several non-academic articles.

=== Board memberships ===
Oster served as the independent director of Welltower Inc, a real estate investment trust that invests mostly in healthcare infrastructure. She also served on corporate boards including Aristotle Corporation, Transpro Inc., and Bentall Kennedy, as well as nonprofit boards, including Choate-Rosemary Hall and Yale University Press.

== Awards and recognition ==
She received the first Yale School of Management Award for Excellence in Teaching in 1988 and received this award again in 2008 and 2013. She was the 2011 winner of the Carolyn Shaw Bell Award from the American Economic Association. In 2018, she was recognized by the Academy of Management with the 2018 Irwin Outstanding Educator Award for Excellence in MBA/Executive Education.

== Personal life and death ==
In 1977, Oster married Ray C. Fair, also a professor of economics at Yale. They had three children, two sons and a daughter, Emily.

She died of lung cancer at her home in New Haven, Connecticut, on June 10, 2022, aged 73.

== Selected publications ==
- Oster, Sharon M. (1999). Modern competitive analysis. Oxford University Press.
- Oster, Sharon M. (1995). Strategic management for nonprofit organizations: Theory and cases. Oxford University Press. ISBN 978-0-19-508503-7.
- Oster, Sharon (1982). "Intra-industry structure and the ease of strategic change". The Review of Economics and Statistics. 64 (3): 376–383. doi:10.2307/1925935. JSTOR 1925935.
- Milgrom, Paul; Oster, Sharon (1987). "Job discrimination, market forces, and the invisibility hypothesis" (PDF). The Quarterly Journal of Economics. 102 (3): 453–476. doi:10.2307/1884213. JSTOR 1884213.
- Oster, Sharon M.; Hamermesh, Daniel S. (1998). "Aging and productivity among economists". Review of Economics and Statistics. 80 (1): 154–156. doi:10.1162/003465398557258. S2CID 57569126.
