= Anna Mikusheva =

Russian economist

- Born: April 29, 1976 (age 50); Orenburg, RSFSR, USSR
- Education: Moscow State University (BA, PhD); New Economic School (MA); Harvard University (PhD)
- Awards: Elaine Bennett Research Prize, 2012
- Scientific career
- Fields: Economics, Statistics
- Workplaces: Massachusetts Institute of Technology
- Doctoral advisor: Alexander Bulinski, James H. Stock
- Doctoral students: Isaiah Andrews
- Website: MIT Economics Department Website

Anna Mikusheva (Анна Евгеньевна Микушева; born April 29, 1976) is the Edward A. Abdun-Nur (1924) Professor of Economics at Massachusetts Institute of Technology. She was the 2012 recipient of the Elaine Bennett Research Prize, a bi-annual prize that recognizes and celebrates research by a woman in the field of Economics, and was selected as a Sloan Research Fellow in 2013. She is a co-editor of the journal Econometric Theory.

== Early life and education ==
Mikusheva grew up in Orenburg, Russia. She studied at Moscow State University, where she earned an undergraduate degree in mathematics in 1998. In 2001, she completed a PhD in probability theory, and simultaneously earned an MA at the New Economic School. In 2007, she completed a PhD in economics at Harvard University, specializing in time series econometrics.

== Career ==
Mikusheva's current research focuses on developing tools to address the estimation of sophisticated macroeconomic models—such as dynamic stochastic general equilibrium (DSGE) models—with the limited amounts of economic data available. Her methods show where estimation of such models is more and less reliable, especially in the case of weakly identified instruments.

== Recognition ==
2013- Sloan Research Fellowship
2012- Elaine Bennett Research Prize

== Selected works ==
- Mikusheva, Anna (2007). "Uniform inference in autoregressive models". Econometrica. 75 (5): 1411–1452. doi:10.1111/j.1468-0262.2007.00798.x. hdl:10.1111/j.1468-0262.2007.00798.x.
- Mikusheva, Anna; Poi, Brian P. (2006). "Tests and confidence sets with correct size when instruments are potentially weak". Stata Journal. 6 (3): 335–347. doi:10.1177/1536867x0600600303.
- Mikusheva, Anna (2010). "Robust confidence sets in the presence of weak instruments". Journal of Econometrics. 157 (2): 236–247. doi:10.1016/j.jeconom.2009.12.003. hdl:1721.1/61662.
