= Jeffrey E. Harris =

American physician and economist

Jeffrey E. Harris, is an economist and physician who has been on the faculty of the Economics Department of the Massachusetts Institute of Technology since 1977. He received an AB (summa cum laude, 1969) from Harvard University, as well as an MD (1974) and a PhD in economics (1975) from the University of Pennsylvania. Having trained in internal medicine at the Massachusetts General Hospital (1974–1977), he maintained a medical practice at that institution until 2006. Since then, he has continued to practice as an internist at federally sponsored community health centers in Rhode Island, where the majority of his patients have poverty-level incomes and are not fluent in English.

== Research ==
Harris has published widely on smoking and health, the economics of smoking and public policy toward the tobacco industry, HIV/AIDS, health economics, as well as economics and statistics generally. He is author of Deadly Choices: Coping with Health Risks in Everyday Life.

== Research publications ==
=== Williamson-Wachter-Harris (1975) ===
As a graduate student, Harris collaborated with his doctoral thesis adviser, Oliver E. Williamson (Nobel Memorial Prize in Economic Sciences, 2008), in an article entitled Understanding the Employment Relation: The Analysis of Idiosyncratic Exchange. This article (294 Web of Science (WoS) citations, 928 Google Scholar (GS) citations) was subsequently reproduced in several collections, including Williamson's Markets and Hierarchies (1975). The article has been described as "the first explicit application of the new institutional economics to internal labor markets."

=== The Internal Organization of Hospitals (1977) ===
Based upon Harris' training in the economics of organization and his experiences as a medical resident, this article (149 WoS citations, 411 GS citations) has been listed as one of the top articles in the last four decades of scholarship in health economics. Reproduced in several collections, the article was cited in the first generation of health economics textbooks as the Harris Model: "The hospital, under Harris' account, is the scene of continual conflict within an organization inherently split into two parts, what Harris describes as a noncooperative oligopoly game."

=== DuMouchel-Harris (1983) ===
Based upon his participation in the Diesel Impacts Study Committee of the National Academy of Sciences, Harris collaborated with William H. DuMouchel in an article entitled Bayes Methods for Combining the Results of Cancer Studies in Humans and Other Species (181 WoS citations, 228 GS citations). As recounted by Sharon Bertsch McGrayne in The Theory That Would Not Die,

"Several civilian researchers tackling hitherto intractable problems concerning public health, sociology, epidemiology, and image restoration did experiment during the 1980s with computers for Bayes. A major controversy about the effect of diesel engine emissions on air quality and cancer inspired the first attempt. By the 1980s cancer specialists had solid data about the effects of cigarette smoke on people, laboratory animals, and cells but little accurate information about diesel fumes. William H. DuMouchel from MIT’s mathematics department and Jeffrey E. Harris from its economics department and Massachusetts General Hospital teamed up in 1983 to ask, 'Could you borrow and extrapolate and take advantage of information from non-human species for humans?' ... Thanks to mice and hamster studies, DuMouchel and Harris were able to conclude that even if light-duty diesel vehicles captured a 25% market share over 20 years, the risk of lung cancer would be negligible for the typical urban resident compared to the typical pack-a-day cigarette smoker. ... Today, Bayesian meta-analyses are statistically old hat, but DuMouchel and Harris made Bayesians salivate for more big-data methods—and for the computing power to deal with them."

=== Cigarette smoking among successive birth cohorts (1983) ===
Motivated by his contributions to the 1979 and 1980 Surgeon General’s Reports, Harris developed a method to reconstruct the smoking rates of successive birth cohorts of men and women throughout the 20th century, based upon individual smoking histories reported in large-scale cross-section surveys. The resulting article, published in the Journal of the National Cancer Institute in 1983 (148 Wos citations, 210 GS citations), spawned a series of studies tracking the birth cohort-specific relationships between smoking rates and disease incidence.

=== Improved short-term survival from AIDS (1990) ===
In an article entitled Improved Short-Term Survival of AIDS Patients Initially Diagnosed with Pneumocystis carinii Pneumonia, 1984 through 1987 (101 WoS citations, 131 GS citations), Harris was one of the first investigators to report a significant gain in life expectancy for AIDS patients, which he attributed to the introduction in 1986 of zidovudine, the first antiretroviral agent.

=== Risk of lung cancer from low tar cigarettes (2004) ===
Harris collaborated with Dr. Michael Thun and his colleagues at the American Cancer Society to study the relationship between cigarette tar yield and the risk of cancer in the Cancer Prevention Study II (CPS-II) cohort (57 WoS citations, 136 GS citations, 36,000 downloads from British Medical Journal website). This prospective cohort study of over 900,000 men and women remains the standard citation for the conclusion that, while cigarette smoking increases the risk of lung cancer compared to nonsmokers, there is no difference in lung cancer risk between those who smoke medium tar cigarettes, low tar cigarettes and very low tar cigarettes.

== Public service ==
Harris was a scientific editor and contributor to U.S. Surgeon General's reports on smoking and health in 1979–1983, 1986, 1988, 1989 and 1996. He has served as a member of several committees of the National Academy of Sciences and the Institute of Medicine, including the Diesel Impacts Study Committee, the Committee to Study the Prevention of Low Birth Weight, the Committee on National Strategies toward Acquired Immunodeficiency Syndrome, the Committee on Risk Characterization, and the Committee on Reducing Tobacco Use. Harris has served as consultant to governmental agencies, including the U.S. National Cancer Institute, U.S. Department of Energy, U.S. Environmental Protection Agency, U.S. Department of Agriculture, U.S. Federal Trade Commission, U.S. Department of Veterans Affairs, U.S. Department of Justice, U.S. Internal Revenue Service, Massachusetts Department of Public Health, Minnesota Attorney General, New York City Department of Health, New Hampshire Association of Counties, the Attorney General of Canada, and the Australian Competition and Consumer Safety Commission. He has consulted for nonprofit public interest organizations, including the American Cancer Society. He has also served as a physician member of the Massachusetts Board of Registration in Medicine (1978–1980).

== Expert testimony ==
Harris has given invited testimony before the Committee on Ways and Means, U.S. House of Representatives; the Committee of the Judiciary, U.S. House of Representatives; the U.S. Senate Judiciary Committee; the U.S. Senate Committee on Agriculture; the U.S. Senate Democratic Task Force; and the Massachusetts Department of Public Health. In 2003, he gave expert testimony in Price v. Philip Morris, a class-action lawsuit alleging fraud in the marketing and sale concerning light cigarettes, in which the trial court entered a $10.1 billion judgment against the defendant. In 2004, he gave expert testimony in United States v. Philip Morris et al., in which the trial court found that tobacco manufacturers had violated the Racketeer Influenced and Corrupt Organizations (RICO) Act. Harris has offered expert testimony in other cases involving the tobacco and pharmaceutical industries.

=== Cipollone v. Liggett (1988) ===
Harris’ role as an expert witness at trial in Cipollone v. Liggett, the first lawsuit in which a jury held the tobacco industry responsible for an individual smoker's death, has been subject to reviews. As recounted by Richard Kluger in his Pulitzer Prize-winning Ashes to Ashes: "Harris tellingly contrasted the tobacco companies' conduct with that of the canning industry, which had adopted new sterilizing methods when botulism was traced to its careless procedures, and the pharmaceutical industry, which had put a skull-and-crossbones warning on preparations found to be toxic when ingested. Such measures were in marked contrast to the conduct of Philip Morris, Harris said, which in the 'Thirties had introduced the humectant diethylene glycol-- a compound later found to be harmful to the kidneys-- based on a minimum of testing..." Harris' unpublished Expert Report on the State of the Art, which was submitted in the Cipollone litigation, itself spawned an inquiry into the role of historians as experts in tobacco-related litigation. As recounted by Robert Proctor in Golden Holocaust, "In a memo titled 'Witness Development,' Arnold & Porter's Janet L. Johnson emphasized to STIC's State-of-the-Art Subcomittee their need to develop a 'storyteller' to tell 'our version' of the history of the recognition of tobacco hazards. Jeffrey Harris's expert report for Cipollone had presented a detailed chronicle of the discovery of lung cancer hazard, identifying evidence from the 1930s and the strong case for proof by 1957. The industry wanted to counter the testimony without having to address when a link had actually been established. 'Instead of trying to defend the issue of whether and when a link between cigarette smoking and lung cancer was established, we should consider focusing our testimony on defending 1954, attacking Harris' 1957 date on which a link was 'proven,' and demonstrate that it was not proven in 1957 with post-57 statements by medical experts about the existence of a controversy'."

== Hispanic collaborations ==
Since he spent the summer of 2005 in a community health center in Guatemala, Harris has developed connections with researchers and policy makers throughout the Spanish-speaking world. He has served as visiting faculty and has given lectures, principally in Spanish, in Guatemala (Universidad Francisco Marroquin), Mexico (Instituto Nacional de Salud Pública), the Dominican Republic (Pontificia Universidad Católica Madre y Maestra, Universidad Tecnológica de Santiago), Spain (University of Las Palmas de Gran Canaria, University of La Laguna, University of Salamanca, Pompeu Fabra University), Costa Rica (Instituto Costarricense de Investigación y Enseñanza en Nutrición y Salud, University of Costa Rica), Uruguay (Fondo Nacional de Recursos, University of the Republic) and Chile (University of Chile, Pontifical Catholic University of Chile). In 2008, Harris was named Huésped Distinguido (Distinguished Guest and Honorary Citizen), City of Salamanca, Spain. In 2011, he received a Fulbright Specialist Award from the U.S. Department of State to establish collaborative connections with academic colleagues in Uruguay. His recent collaborative research work includes studies of physician specialty choice in Spain and the evaluation of Uruguay's tobacco control campaign. Since 2013, he has embarked on a series of collaborative projects in Chile sponsored by the MIT Sloan Latin America Office and the MIT MISTI/Chile Program.
