= Iván Werning =

Argentine economist

- Born: June 20, 1974 (age 52)

Academic background
- Education: University of Chicago (PhD); Universidad Torcuato di Tella (MA); Universidad de San Andrés (BA)
- Academic advisors: Fernando Alvarez; Robert Lucas; Gary Becker; Pierre-André Chiappori

Academic work
- Discipline: Macroeconomics
- Institutions: Massachusetts Institute of Technology
- Doctoral students: Emmanuel Farhi; Stefanie Stantcheva; Veronica Guerrieri; Ludwig Straub; Adrien Auclert; Matt Rognlie
- Notable ideas: Research on optimal dynamic taxation
- Website: Information at IDEAS / RePEc

Iván Werning (born June 20, 1974) is an Argentine economist who has served as the Robert M. Solow Professor of Economics at the Massachusetts Institute of Technology since 2014.

Born in Argentina, Werning received a BA in economics from the Universidad de San Andrés, and an MA in economics from the Universidad Torcuato di Tella, both in Buenos Aires. He received a PhD in economics from the University of Chicago in 2002, where he studied under Gary Becker, Robert Lucas, Fernando Alvarez, and Pierre-André Chiappori. He joined the Department of Economics at MIT as an assistant professor in 2002, where he was tenured in 2007, and appointed the Robert M. Solow Professor of Economics in 2014.

Werning has been a research fellow at the NBER since 2002. He was elected a Fellow of the Econometric Society in 2013, and was elected to the American Academy of Arts and Sciences in 2015.

In 2008, he was described by The Economist as one of the world’s 8 best young economists.
