= David S. Evans =

American economist and business executive

David Sparks Evans (born 1954) is an American economist specializing in antitrust and two-sided markets. He is the chairman of Global Economics, Inc., and founding editor of Competition Policy International. He teaches at the University College London, where he is the co-executive director of the Jevons Institute for Competition Law and Economics, and at the University of Chicago Law School.

Previously, Evans was founder of Market Platform Dynamics and the former head of the global competition policy practice at LECG, LLC. He previously taught at the department of economics and law school at Fordham University.

Evans focuses on business strategy and competition policy particularly in high-technology and multi-sided platform businesses, such as payments, software, and digital media. His most recent book is Catalyst Code (with Richard L. Schmalensee), which deals with the management problems faced by multi-sided businesses.

Evans is also Editor-In-Chief for FinReg21.

== Work with eSapience ==
In the mid-2000s, Evans and his wife, Karen L. Webster, were chairman and managing director respectively, of the now defunct eSapience public relations firm of Cambridge, Massachusetts. Karen Webster also is the founder of pymnts.com. An article on boston.com on March 10, 2007, quotes eSapience's website, which was live at the time, as describing itself as '"not merely a public relations firm, but a "new media and research entity that shapes the debate on issues that intersect law, economics, and policy" through "a global network of academics and other public intellectuals."' One of eSapience's clients was Maurice "Hank" Greenberg, former president of the American International Group (AIG), who was forced out as chairman and chief executive in 2005 by AIG's directors. The directors did this after then Attorney General Eliot Spitzer of New York brought charges of fraud and other violations against Greenberg. eSapience was hired by Greenberg to create a branding campaign for him.

On March 10, 2007, the Boston Globe reported on the lawsuit that eSapience filed against Greenberg's company, New York investment firm C.V. Starr & Co., for allegedly refusing to pay $2 million in bills from the image campaign for which eSapience was hired. Several other publications covered the legal dispute, focusing on the ethical use of academics, such as Evans and Richard Schmalensee, dean of MIT's Sloan School of Management, in this rebranding campaign. On March 12, 2007, The New Republic reported on the lawsuit, with the subheadline: "How a shady, right-wing p.r. firmed tried to buy academic influence." Other media outlets, such as The Financial Times, the Daily Kos, HCRenewal Blog, Harper's Magazine on Washington, to name a few, covered the issue.

== Education ==
Evans received his B.A., M.A., and Ph.D. (1983) in Economics from The University of Chicago.

== Bibliography ==
- Lightening Up on Market Definition," in E. Elhauge, ed., Research Handbook on the Economics of Antitrust Law (New York: Edward Elgar, forthcoming 2011).
- The Effect of the Consumer Financial Protection Act of 2009 on Consumer Credit," Loyola Consumer Law Review, 2010.
- "The Online Advertising Industry: Economics, Evolution, and Privacy," Journal of Economic Perspectives, Summer 2009.
- "Markets with Two-Sided Platforms," Issues in Competition Law and Policy (ABA Section of Antitrust Law), Vol. 1, Chapter 28, 2008, with Richard Schmalensee.
- "Antitrust Issues Raised by the Emerging Global Internet Economy," Northwestern University Law Review, Vol. 102, No. 4, p. 285, Colloquy Essay, 2008.
- "The Role of Cost in Determining When Firms Offer Bundles and Ties," Journal of Industrial Economics, Vol. 56, Issue 1, March 2008 with Michael A. Salinger.
- Evans, David S.; Trustbusters: Competition Policy Authorities Speak Out, Boston, MA: Competition Policy International, 2009. ISBN 978-0-578-01973-4
- Evans, David S. and Richard Schmalensee; Catalyst Code: The Strategies Behind the World's Most Dynamic Companies. Cambridge, Massachusetts: Harvard Business School Press, 2007. ISBN 1-4221-0199-1 ISBN 978-1-4221-0199-5
- Evans, David S., "The Antitrust Economics of Multi-Sided Platform Markets", Yale Journal on Regulation vol. 20, no. 2 (2003): 325–381.
- Evans, David S. and Richard Schmalensee. Paying with Plastic: The Digital Revolution in Buying and Borrowing, 2nd ed. Cambridge, Massachusetts: MIT Press, 2005. ISBN 0-262-55058-X ISBN 978-0-262-55058-1
- Evans, David S., Andrei Hagiu, and Richard Schmalensee; Invisible Engines: How Software Platforms Drive Innovation and Transform Industries. Cambridge, Massachusetts: MIT Press, 2006. ISBN 0-262-05085-4 ISBN 978-0-262-05085-2
