= David S. Scharfstein =

- Born: 1960 (age 64–65)
- Occupation: Economist
- Employer: Harvard Business School

Academic background
- Education: Princeton University (BA); Massachusetts Institute of Technology (PhD)
- Doctoral advisor: Oliver Hart; Eric Maskin

Academic work
- Doctoral students: Judith Chevalier
- Website: Information at IDEAS / RePEc

David S. Scharfstein (born 1960) is the Edmund Cogswell Converse Professor of Finance and Banking at Harvard Business School.

== Biography ==
He received an AB in 1982 from the Woodrow Wilson School of Public and International Affairs, at Princeton University, and, in 1986, a PhD in economics from MIT. He then joined Harvard Business School in 1986 as Assistant professor of Business Management, moving to the Sloan School of Management at MIT as Assistant Professor of Finance in 1987. He was promoted there to Associate Professor in 1990, and to Dai-Ichi Kangyo Bank Professor of Management and Professor of Finance, in 1994. According to his faculty page at Harvard, he is interested in "Banking, financial distress, risk management, corporate investment, private equity." He returned to Harvard Business School as Professor of Business Administration in 2003, receiving his present Converse professorship the following year.

== Work ==
From 2009 to 2010, he was Senior Advisor to the United States Department of the Treasury.

He has published 37 peer-reviewed articles on various aspects of capital management, and written 10 working papers and 11 Harvard Business School cases. He criticized the 2008 United States Bank Bailout in two New York Times articles He has been a Member of the Board of Editors of Journal of Economic Literature from January 2013 on, and Editor of RAND Journal of Economics from 1995 to 1998.

He has been Associate Editor of Economics Letters since 1994, and has also been Associate Editor of Journal of Financial Services Research, Journal of Finance and Financial Studies.
