= Bayesian persuasion =

Technique in mechanism design

In economics and game theory, Bayesian persuasion occurs when one participant (the sender) wants to persuade the other (the receiver) of a certain course of action. There is an unknown state of the world, and the sender must commit to a decision of what information to disclose to the receiver. Upon seeing said information, the receiver will revise their belief about the state of the world using Bayes' rule and select an action. Bayesian persuasion was introduced by Emir Kamenica and Matthew Gentzkow.

Bayesian persuasion is a special case of a principal–agent problem: the principal is the sender and the agent is the receiver. It can also be seen as a communication protocol, comparable to signaling games; the sender must decide what signal to reveal to the receiver to maximize their expected utility. It can also be seen as a form of cheap talk, where the sender has the commitment power.

== Example ==
A medical company (the sender) produces a new medicine, and needs the approval of the regulator (the receiver). There are two possible states of the world: the medicine can be either "good" or "bad". The company and the regulator do not know the true state. However, the company can run an experiment and report the results to the regulator. The question is what experiment the company should run in order to get the best outcome for themselves. The assumptions are:

- Both company and regulator share a common prior probability that the medicine is good.
- The company must commit to the experiment design and the reporting of the results (so there is no element of deception). The regulator observes the experiment design.
- The company receives a payoff if and only if the medicine is approved.
- The regulator receives a payoff if and only if it provides an accurate outcome (approving a good medicine or rejecting a bad one).

For example, suppose the prior probability that the medicine is good is 1/3 and that the company has a choice of three actions:

1. Conduct a thorough experiment that always detects whether the medicine is good or bad, and truthfully report the results to the regulator. In this case, the regulator will approve the medicine with probability 1/3, so the expected utility of the company is 1/3.
2. Don't conduct any experiment; always say "the medicine is good". In this case, the signal does not give any information to the regulator. As the regulator believes that the medicine is good with probability 1/3, the expectation-maximizing action is to always reject it. Therefore, the expected utility of the company is 0.
3. Conduct an experiment that, if the medicine is good, always reports "good", and if the medicine is bad, it reports "good" or "bad" with probability 1/2. Here, the regulator applies Bayes' rule: given a signal "good", the probability that the medicine is good is 1/2, so the regulator approves it. Given a signal "bad", the probability that the medicine is good is 0, so the regulator rejects it. All in all, the regulator approves the medicine in 2/3 of the cases, so the expected utility of the company is 2/3.

In this case, the third policy is optimal for the sender since this has the highest expected utility of the available options. Using the Bayes rule, the sender has persuaded the receiver to act in a favorable way to the sender.

== Generalized model ==
The basic model has been generalized in a number of ways, including:

- The receiver may have private information not shared with the sender.
- The sender and receiver may have a different prior on the state of the world.
- There may be multiple senders, where each sends a signal simultaneously and all receivers receive all signals before acting.
- There may be multiple senders who send signals sequentially, and the receiver receives all signals before acting.
- There may be multiple receivers, including cases where each receives their own signal, the same signal, or signals which are correlated in some way, and where each receiver may factor in the actions of other receivers.
- A series of signals may be sent over time.

== Practical application ==
The applicability of the model has been assessed in a number of real-world contexts:

- Disclosure of capital reserves by banks to financial regulators.
- Grading of students' work by teachers, where the receivers are potential future employers.
- Provision of feedback by an employer to employees.
- Revelation of plot points from a creator of fictional work to entertain its reader or viewer.

== Computational approach ==
Algorithmic techniques have been developed to compute the optimal signalling scheme in practice. This can be found in polynomial time with respect to the number of actions and pseudo-polynomial time with respect to the number of states of the world. Algorithms with lower computational complexity are also possible under stronger assumptions.

The online case, where multiple signals are sent over time, can be solved efficiently as a regret minimization problem.
