= Mark J. Machina =

American economist

- Born: October 27, 1954 (age 71)
- Citizenship: United States

Academic background
- Education: MIT; Michigan State University
- Doctoral advisor: Franklin M. Fisher

Mark Joseph Machina (born October 27, 1954) is an American economist noted for work in non-standard decision theory. He is currently a distinguished professor at the University of California, San Diego. The Marschak–Machina triangle, a probability diagram used in expected utility theory, bears his name, along with that of Jacob Marschak.

== Machina Triangle ==
The Machina Triangle is a way of representing a three dimensional probability vector in a two dimensional space. The probability of a given outcome is denoted by a euclidean distance from the point that represents a lottery (probability).
