= Marina Halac =

Argentine economist

- Born: November 17, 1979 (age 46); Buenos Aires, Argentina
- Education: Universidad del CEMA, University of California at Berkeley
- Awards: Elaine Bennett Research Prize, 2016; George S. Eccles Research Award, 2017
- Scientific career
- Fields: Economics
- Workplaces: Yale University, Columbia Business School, University of Warwick
- Doctoral advisors: Benjamin Hermalin; Steven Tadelis; Shachar Kariv
- Website: https://economics.yale.edu/people/marina-halac

Marina Halac (born November 17, 1979) is a professor of economics at Yale University. She is the current editor of Econometrica, and has served as a member of the editorial board of the American Economic Review, the Review of Economic Studies, and Theoretical Economics. She was the 2016 recipient of the Elaine Bennett Research Prize, which is awarded biennially by the American Economic Association to recognize outstanding research by a woman. She received this award within the first seven years after completing her PhD in economics from the University of California, Berkeley. In 2017, she was named one of the "Best 40 under 40 Business School Professors" by Poets and Quants. She was a recipient of the George S. Eccles Research Award in 2017, which is awarded to the author of the best book or writings on economics that bridge theory and practice, as determined by top members of the Columbia Business School faculty and alumni.

Halac was born and raised in Buenos Aires and studied economics at the University of CEMA, Argentina from 1998 to 2001. Here, her professors encouraged her to pursue an advanced economics degree in the United States. Following her graduation in 2001, she and her husband, Guillermo Noguera, became research assistants at the World Bank in Washington, D.C., and then both earned doctoral degrees in economics at the University of California at Berkeley.

Her research focuses on theoretical models of how to optimally delegate decision making, such as optimal rules for firms that need to delegate investment decisions to managers with competing incentives, problems of how to motivate experimentation and innovation, the design of fiscal rules to constrain government spending, and the role of reputation in maintaining productivity, addressing strategic uncertainty with incentives and information, and inflation targeting under political pressure. Her work on relational contracting, which studies how best to design contracts in a principal-agent setting where the value of the relationship is not mutually known, suggests new ways to approach dynamic contracting problems with bargaining. Additionally, her work regarding fiscal rules and discretion under political shocks examines a specific fiscal policy model where the government has preferences that are time-inconsistent, with a present bias towards public spending. While she is currently employed as an economics professor at Yale University, she has taught at Columbia University, Graduate School of Business, Economics Division as well as the University of Warwick. She is a fellow of the Econometric Society.

== Selected works ==
- Halac, Marina (2012). "Relational Contracts and the Value of Relationships". American Economic Review. 102 (2): 750–79. doi:10.1257/aer.102.2.750. JSTOR 23245433.
- Halac, Marina; Kartik, Navin; Liu, Qingmin (2016). "Optimal Contracts for Experimentation" (PDF). Review of Economic Studies. 83 (3): 1040–1091. doi:10.1093/restud/rdw013.
- Halac, Marina; Yared, Pierre (2014). "Fiscal Rules and Discretion under Persistent Shocks" (PDF). Econometrica. 82 (5): 1557–1614. doi:10.3982/ecta11207. JSTOR 24029290.
- Halac, Marina; Prat, Andrea (2016). "Managerial attention and worker performance" (PDF). The American Economic Review. 106 (10): 3104–3132. doi:10.1257/aer.20140772.
- "Marina Halac". EconPapers.
