= Matthew Gentzkow =

American economist

- Born: April 27, 1975 (age 51); Portland, Oregon, US
- Known for: Bayesian persuasion

Academic background
- Education: Harvard University (BA, MA, PhD)
- Doctoral advisor: Ariel Pakes; Andrei Shleifer

Academic work
- Discipline: Microeconomics; Industrial Organization; Political economy
- Institutions: Stanford University; University of Chicago
- Awards: John Bates Clark Medal (2014)
- Website: matthewgentzkow.com; Information at IDEAS / RePEc

Matthew Gentzkow (born April 27, 1975) is an American economist and a professor of economics at Stanford University. Previously, he was the Richard O. Ryan Professor of Economics and Neubauer Family Faculty Fellow at the University of Chicago Booth School of Business. He was awarded the 2014 John Bates Clark Medal. He was elected a member of the National Academy of Sciences in 2022.

== Academic career ==
Gentzkow received his B.A. in economics in 1997, M.A. in economics in 2002, and Ph.D. in economics in 2004, all from Harvard University. His research is in the fields of Industrial Organization and Political Economy.

== Work ==
Gentzkow studies the transmission of information, in theory and in practice. His work has identified why persuasion can occur, the causes of media bias, and the effect of the media on real outcomes.

One of his most influential papers is the seminal "Bayesian Persuasion", co-authored with Emir Kamenica in 2011. The problem they consider is that of a sender who sends a signal to a receiver, and who is bound to truthfully report the findings of experiments. Both sender and receiver start with an accurate prior, and thus revealing true information cannot change their average posterior. The sender does, however, have discretion over what experiments they implement. How and when can that agent increase their utility? Kamenica and Gentzkow are able to show that, so long as the response of the receiver is non-linear as a function of their beliefs, and the distribution of posteriors is convex, the sender can design a signal which changes the receiver's action to their benefit.

To give a concrete example, consider a prosecutor who wishes to convince a judge that a defendant is guilty. The prosecutor does not care about guilt or innocence, but simply wants to maximize the number of people convicted. Both the prosecutor and judge know that the true probability a defendant is guilty is .3, and also assume that a full investigation would perfectly establish who is and isn't guilty. The judge will convict whenever their posterior probability of guilt exceeds .5. If the prosecutor conducts no investigation, they will get no people convicted; if they conduct a full investigation, then 30% of people will get convicted. It is possible for them to do better, however. Suppose they test the blood at the crime scene for its blood type, and it's type A. 42% of people in the US have type A blood, so the likelihood of guilt is pushed above .5, and the prosecutor stops there. For the rest, the prosecutor fully investigates. It is possible for up to 60% of people in the example to be convicted, despite everyone knowing the true probabilities involved.

This has had a considerable influence on economic theory, and created the subfield of information design. It explains why, to give a few examples, everyone can benefit from schools only providing coarse information about grades, police should imperfectly randomize where they patrol, or why Google might reduce congestion by only sharing imperfect information.

Gentzkow has also studied the extent and sources of media bias in America, commonly with Jesse Shapiro. In "Media Bias and Reputation", they describe biased media as rationally arising from consumer uncertainty. People do not initially know which news sources are accurate or not, but they do have prior beliefs about how the world is. When they see a news source agree with them, they change their beliefs about the source and regard it as higher. In contrast with prior work, their model predicts that increased competition should reduce bias. Gentzkow, Shapiro, and Sinkinson find that, historically, competition would increase the ideological diversity of the newspapers available.

They empirically explore how consumers drive media bias in "What Drives Media Slant?". In order to estimate this, they must first construct an index of slant which has meaningful cardinality, which they do using differences in language choice between Republicans and Democrats in the 2005 Congressional Register. Having measured how slanted different newspapers are, they can then estimate the demand for slant by looking at the difference in circulation between neighborhoods which have more Republicans or Democrats. They then take this estimate of demand for slant, and ask how much slant would newspapers choose, if they were being profit-maximizing. Since the actual amount of slant closely matches the profit-maximizing amount, they conclude that owners have no influence on the amount of media bias, and that it is in fact driven by what people demand. Two newspapers which have the same owner will be no more similar to each other than if they were owned by different people.

In recent years, Gentzkow has been a leader in understanding political polarization, misinformation, and social media. In contrast to popular stories, he (with Boxell and Shapiro) does not find that social media meaningfully contributed to political polarization. Polarization grew most among those groups least exposed to social media. Polarization grew more in the United States compared to other countries, although they cannot say with confidence why.

Alcott and Gentzkow quantify how much "fake news" there was in the 2016 election, the partisan lean, and how that affected which news was likely to be believed. Fake news was slanted toward Donald Trump, but was of little consequence — they provide a back-of-the-envelope effect size of perhaps a hundredth of a percentage point's difference in vote share.

Gentzkow has also studied how much social media improves, or doesn't improve, welfare. Social media is addictive — people's demand for the good shapes how much they demand it. In "The Welfare Effects of Social Media", he, Allcott, Braghieri, and Eichmeyer conducted an experiment in which participants turned off Facebook for four weeks prior to the 2018 midterm election. Participants who stopped using Facebook reported a large increase in well-being, and a persistent decline in the use of Facebook afterwards.

The habit-forming nature of social media will tend to overstate the consumer surplus gained, although it is still substantially positive. In "Digital Addiction", Allcott, Gentzkow and Song give study participants incentives to adopt limits on their social media use. Consistent with their view, these limits had persistent effects, and substantially reduced the consumption of social media. People did not fully take into account the habit forming nature of social media consumption when they set out. Gentzkow and co-authors estimate that 31% of social media use is due to addictive behavior.

== Selected publications ==
- Gentzkow, Matthew; Shapiro, Jesse M. (2011). "Ideological Segregation Online and Offline" (PDF). Quarterly Journal of Economics. 126 (4): 1799–1839. doi:10.1093/qje/qjr044. hdl:1811/52901. S2CID 9303073.
- Gentzkow, Matthew; Shapiro, Jesse M.; Sinkinson, Michael (2011). "The Effect of Newspaper Entry and Exit on Electoral Politics" (PDF). American Economic Review. 101 (7): 2980–3018. doi:10.1257/aer.101.7.2980. S2CID 8735798.
- Gentzkow, Matthew; Shapiro, Jesse M. (2006). "Media Bias and Reputation". Journal of Political Economy. 114 (2): 280–316. doi:10.1086/499414. S2CID 222429768.
