= Jesse Shapiro =

American economist (born circa 1979)

- Born: c. 1979 (age 46–47); United States
- Spouse: Emily Oster
- Relatives: Ray Fair (father-in-law)

Academic background
- Education: Harvard University (AB, AM, PhD)
- Doctoral advisor: Edward Glaeser
- Influences: Steven D. Levitt

Academic work
- Discipline: Political economy Behavioral economics
- School or tradition: Chicago School of Economics
- Institutions: Harvard University; Brown University; University of Chicago
- Awards: MacArthur Fellowship
- Website: Information at IDEAS / RePEc

Jesse M. Shapiro is an American economist who has served as the George Gund Professor of Economics and Business Administration at Harvard University since 2022. He was previously the George S. and Nancy B. Parker Professor of Economics at Brown University from 2015 to 2019, and the Eastman Professor of Political Economy at Brown from 2019 to 2021. He received a MacArthur Fellowship in 2021.

== Education and career ==
Shapiro attended Stuyvesant High School, where he was valedictorian in 1997. He received an AB in economics and an AM in statistics from Harvard University in 2001, and a PhD in economics from Harvard in 2005. From 2005 to 2007, he was a Becker Fellow at the Becker Center on Chicago Price Theory at the University of Chicago. He was an assistant professor of economics at the Booth School of Business from 2007 to 2010, where he was appointed the Chookaszian Family Professor of Economics in 2014. He moved to Brown University the following year, where he was the George S. and Nancy B. Parker Professor of Economics from 2015 to 2019, and the Eastman Professor of Political Economy from 2019 to 2021. He returned to his alma mater, Harvard, in 2022, where he is currently the George Gund Professor of Economics and Business Administration.

Shapiro's work has made significant contributions to the fields of industrial organization, political economy and behavioral economics, and he has authored or co-authored papers on obesity in the United States, polarisation in the media, and polarisation in political opinions.

In 2008, The Economist described Shapiro as one of the 8 best young economists in the world. In 2021, he was named a MacArthur Fellow for "devising new frameworks of analysis to advance understanding of media bias, ideological polarization, and the efficacy of public policy interventions."

Shapiro has been a research associate at the NBER since 2011, and was a member of the Steering Committee of its Political Economy Program from 2014 to 2020. He served as editor of the Journal of Political Economy from 2012 to 2017, and was elected a Fellow of the Econometric Society in 2017.

=== Selected works ===
- Cutler, David M., Edward L. Glaeser, and Jesse M. Shapiro. "Why have Americans become more obese?." Journal of Economic Perspectives 17, no. 3 (2003): 93–118.
- Gentzkow, Matthew, and Jesse M. Shapiro. "What drives media slant? Evidence from US daily newspapers." Econometrica 78, no. 1 (2010): 35–71.
- Shapiro, Jesse M. "Smart cities: quality of life, productivity, and the growth effects of human capital." Review of Economics and Statistics 88, no. 2 (2006): 324–335.
- Gentzkow, Matthew, and Jesse M. Shapiro. "Media bias and reputation." Journal of Political Economy 114, no. 2 (2006): 280–316.
- Gentzkow, Matthew, Jesse M. Shapiro, and Michael Sinkinson. "The effect of newspaper entry and exit on electoral politics." American Economic Review 101, no. 7 (2011): 2980–3018.
- Gentzkow, Matthew, and Jesse M. Shapiro. "Ideological segregation online and offline." Quarterly Journal of Economics 126, no. 4 (2011): 1799–1839.

== Personal life ==
Shapiro is the son of Joyce and Arvin Shapiro. He married economist Emily Oster in June 2006. They have two children.
