= University of CEMA =

Private university in Argentina

- Universidad del CEMA
- Motto: "Elegí quién querés ser"
- Type: Private university, Research university
- Established: 1978
- Founder: Roque Fernández
- Academic affiliations: AMBA, CFA
- Chancellor: Edgardo Zablotsky
- Vice-Chancellor: Antonio Marín
- Students: 1179
- Location: Buenos Aires, Argentina
- Campus: Urban
- Sporting affiliations: ADAU
- Website: ucema.edu.ar

The University of CEMA is a private university in Buenos Aires, Argentina. It was founded by Carlos Rodríguez, along with Roque Fernández and Pedro Pou, as the Center for Macro-economic Studies of Argentina (CEMA) University Institute in 1995, a pioneer in higher education programs in the areas of economics, politics, management, and finance in Argentina.

First founded as a research center to contribute to the economic development of the country, the university now offers twelve undergraduate courses, sixteen graduate-level programs, and a wide range of executive education programs. At present, UCEMA has more than 262 faculty members with terminal academic degrees in their fields of study, 6068 alumni, and 1179 students. The comprehensive set of actions carried out by the University includes a wide range of fields; within a framework of humanistic and liberal education.

== History ==
=== Founding ===
The beginnings of the UCEMA date back to 1978, the year in which the Center for Macroeconomic Studies of Argentina (CEMA) began its activity. The CEMA, had the purpose of contributing to the dissemination of knowledge (especially diverse and modern economic theories). In 1980s, the center started its offering masters degrees in Economy & Business Administration. In the 1990s, the center started offering masters degrees in Finance, Bank Management, and Agribusiness. Later on, the teaching activities extended to other fields, and in 1995, the study center was transformed into a university. In 1996, the Bachelor of Economics and Bachelor of Business Administration degree courses were created. From the year 2000, the University began to offer doctorate degrees in Economics, Business Administration and Finance. In 2003, the Department of Engineering was created and the Computer Engineering degree was introduced to the list of possible programs. International Relations and Marketing degrees were added in 2009, and the Bachelor of Human Resources in 2015. Degrees in Digital Business, Analytical Business, and Finance, were added in 2020.

=== Links with the University of Chicago ===
In the late 1950s, there was a concern in the Argentine academic world regarding the participation in the development of economic theories that were taking place in various academic centers of international prestige. A preliminary idea was conceived in Chile, in 1955, through the creation of a joint economics program between the University of Chicago and the Catholic University of Chile. This agreement is notable as the program stipulated that, between the end of 1961 and the beginning of 1962, a similar program would be considered in Argentina.

==== Joint Initiative for Latin American Experimental Economics ====
The University of Chicago and UCEMA agreed to operate the Joint Initiative for Latin American Experimental Economics in the city of Buenos Aires. The Initiative is co-chaired by John List; Kenneth Griffin, Distinguished Service Professor of Economics at the Department of Economics at the University of Chicago; and Julio Elías, Director of the Master's in Economics at UCEMA. The main objective of the Initiative is to design field experiments to offer new perspectives in various areas of economic research for Latin American countries, such as education, private provision of public goods, social preferences, environmental economics. The Initiative is based at UCEMA, where it welcomes visiting researchers from the Experimental Economics group at the University of Chicago and invited researchers from other universities working on related issues in Latin America.

== Buildings and sites ==
UCEMA's two main buildings are in downtown Buenos Aires, a few meters from the intersection of Córdoba and Leandro N. Alem avenues.

- Headquarters:

Av. Córdoba 374, Ciudad de Buenos Aires

- Sede Reconquista:

Reconquista 775, Ciudad de Buenos Aires

- Sede Finanzas

Av. Córdoba 637, Ciudad de Buenos Aires

The University has more than sixty offices for professors and researchers, more than thirty classrooms with a capacity for forty students, twelve quiet study rooms, rest and recreation rooms, a main hall, a multipurpose room, an auditorium, a computer center, of copying and bar.

=== Adrián Guissarri Library ===
The UCEMA library was created concurrently with the Center for Macroeconomic Studies (CEMA) in 1978 at Calle Virrey del Pino 3210 and had a manual catalog that the user had to consult on-site. On October 30, 2007, the UCEMA Library was renamed the "Adrián Guissarri Library", in homage to the economist, Library user, and one of its greatest benefactors: he donated his personal library to the Institution.

The Adrián Guissarri Library updated its services over time and today its collection is made up of printed material, online databases, electronic books, etc. Currently, the Library is located at the UCEMA headquarters at Av. Córdoba 374.

== Programs ==
=== Undergraduate ===
- Economics
- Business Economics
- Business Administration
- Public Accountant
- Marketing
- Digital Business
- Analytic Business
- Finance
- International Relations
- Law
- Political Science
- Computing engineer

=== Graduate ===
- Ph.D. in Business Administration
- Ph.D. in Finance
- Ph.D. in Digital Business
- Ph.D. in Economics
- Master in Business Administration
- Master in Economics
- Master in Finances
- Master in International Studies
- Master in Agribusiness
- Master in State science
- Master in Project Evaluation
- Postgraduate in Management
- Postgraduate in Human Resources
- Specialization in Finance
- Specialization in Project Evaluation

=== Executive ===
The university offers a lot of executive programs such as Sport Business, Change Management, Behavioral Economics, Customer Experience, and many others.

== Research and publications ==
The institution has five of its own research centers: the Center for Applied Economics (CEA), the Center for the Economy of Creativity (CEC), the Center for Research in Management, Entrepreneurship and Investments (CIMEI), the Interdisciplinary Center for Politics, Business and Economics and the Organization and Productivity Studies (CEOP).

Currently, one of his research works highlighted and consulted by many media is the Executive Professional Basket (CPE). The CPE evaluates the cost of a representative consumption basket for the family group of an executive professional.

== Student Life ==
=== Sport ===
UCEMA actively participates in sports tournaments organized by the University Amateur Sports Association (ADAU). UCEMA teams participate in tennis, chess, football, and golf. Physical activity and sporting events take place during the weekends and training take place on weekdays in the evening hours. In addition to these, there are football practices organized by students from the university.

== Notable faculty and alumni ==
- Jorge César Ávila, Ph.D. in Economics, University of Chicago.
- Amado Boudou, former Vicepresident, head of the National Social Security Administration (ANSES) and Minister of Economy of the Argentine Republic.
- Andrés Cisneros, former Vice-Chancellor, Secretary of Foreign Affairs and Latin American Affairs and Minister of Foreign Affairs, International Trade and Worship of the Argentine Republic.
- Alejandro L. Corbacho, Ph.D. in Political Science, University of Connecticut.
- Carlos Escudé, Argentine political scientist, researcher, writer and intellectual trained at Yale University, with previous studies at Oxford University, and at the Argentine Catholic University.
- José Luis Espert, National Congressman for the province of Buenos Aires. Former candidate for the presidency of the Argentine Republic.
- Roque Fernández, former President of the Central Bank, and Minister of Economy, Works and Public Services of the Argentine Republic.
- Marina Halac, professor of economics at Yale University. Winner of the Elaine Bennett Research Prize.
- Diana Mondino, Master in Economics and Business Management, IESE - Universidad de Navarra.
- Sybil Rhodes, Ph.D. in Political Science, Stanford University. Director of the Department of Political Science and International Relations. President of the Center for the Opening and Development of Latin America (CADAL).
- Carlos A. Rodríguez, former Chief of the Cabinet of Advisors to the Minister of Economy and Secretary of Economic Policy.
- Juan Carlos de Pablo, Dr. honoris causa, UCEMA; Master of Arts in Economics, Harvard University; Degree in Economics, Pontifical Catholic University of Argentina.
- Alejandro Eduardo Fargosi, former Counselor of the National Judiciary.
- Martín Krause, Doctor in Administration, Universidad Católica de La Plata. Member of the Mont Pelerin Society, associate academician of the Cato Institute and of the Academic Council of the Fundación Libertad y Progreso.
- Ricardo Hipólito López Murphy, National Congressman for the City of Autonomous City of Buenos Aires. Former Minister of Defense, Minister of Economy and Minister of Infrastructure and Housing. Former candidate for the presidency of the Argentine Republic.
- Emilio Ocampo, Master of Business Administration, University of Chicago; Degree in Economics, UBA.
- Martin Uribe, Columbia University economics professor, editor-in-chief of the Journal of International Economics
