= Journal of Labor Economics =

The Journal of Labor Economics
- Discipline: Economics
- Language: English

Publication details
- History: 1983-present
- Publisher: University of Chicago Press for The Society of Labor Economists (United States)
- Frequency: Quarterly
- Impact factor: 3.607 (2017)

Standard abbreviations
- ISO 4: J. Labor Econ.

Indexing
- ISSN: 0734-306X (print); 1537-5307 (web)
- LCCN: 83644293
- JSTOR: 0734306X
- OCLC no.: 605915677

Links
- Journal homepage; Online archive

The Journal of Labor Economics is an academic journal published quarterly by the University of Chicago Press on international research examining issues affecting the economy as well as social and private behavior. It covers various aspects of labor economics, including supply and demand of labor services, personnel economics, distribution of income, unions and collective bargaining, and labor markets and demographics. It is an official publication of the Society of Labor Economists.

The Journal was first published in January 1983. Since then, 28 volumes and 120 issues have been published (as of August 19, 2010).

In a 2009 working paper conducted by an economist at the Federal Reserve Bank of St. Louis, The Journal of Labor Economics was ranked 8th out of 30 economic journals in terms of number of articles and citations. (The analysis included publications of these 30 journals between 2001 and 2008.) According to the Journal Citation Reports, the journal has a 2017 impact factor of 3.607.

The Journal's editor-in-chief is Paul Oyer. Its co-editors include Oriana Bandiera.
