= Carlos Alfredo Rodríguez =

Argentine economist

Carlos Alfredo Rodríguez is an Argentine economist. A member of the Chicago school of economics, he served as Deputy Minister of the Economy under Carlos Menem and as an advisor to Javier Milei's presidential campaign in 2023.

== Early career ==
Rodriguez obtained his undergraduate degree in Economics from the University of Buenos Aires in 1969, and a Ph.D. in economics from the University of Chicago in 1973. Between 1973 and 1978, he taught at Columbia University in New York.

In 1979, he returned to Argentina and joined Center of Argentine Macroeconomic Studies.

== International role ==
He has been visiting professor at the University of Chicago, Princeton University and the University of Montevideo, as well as consultant and visiting scholar at the World Bank, the Agency for International Development (AID), and the International Monetary Fund. As an international consultant he has participated in missions in almost all countries in Latin America as well as Poland, Czechoslovakia, the ex-USSR and Romania. In 1987, he was designated member of the Argentine Academy of Economic Sciences. Between 1996 and 1998, he was vice-minister of economics and secretary for economic policy of Argentina. In 1994, he was the founding president of the Universidad del CEMA (Rector), a position he holds until 2018. At UCEMA, he was also director of the Ph.D. program in economics, and professor of international monetary economics.

== Publications ==
He has published more than 60 papers in international journals, including Econometrica, American Economic Review and the Journal of Political Economy. His main research fields are Macroeconomics and International Economics. Other academic activities include: Member of the Editorial Board of the World Bank Economic Review(1988–90), founding Editor of the Journal of Applied Economics (1998-2008), Guggenheim Fellow (1983-84), and Director of the Center of Applied Economics at UCEMA.

== See also ==
- Chicago School of Economics
