= FinReg21 =

FinReg21.com
- Founded: 2009
- Headquarters: Washington, D.C., {{{location_country}}}
- Area served: Worldwide
- Founders: Market Platform Dynamics; Sift Groups
- Key people: David S. Evans; Editor
- Website: FinReg21.com

FinReg21.com is an online media company that provides news, commentary and expert content on financial services regulation in the U.S. and around the world.

A joint venture between Market Platform Dynamics and Sift Groups, FinReg21 was founded in March 2009, after the 2008 financial crisis. David S. Evans is the editor-in-chief.

Among the part of FinReg21's website are:

- News (FinReg21 reporting plus content from Reuters, Business Wire, and PR Newswire)
- Commentary (content from around the web, including from LinkedIn Group, Proposals for the Reform of the Financial Services Industry, Simon Johnson, Scott Sumner, Paul Krugman, and Daniel Kauffman)
- Lombard Street (bi-weekly journal typically of five articles; topics include banking regulation and deposit insurance. Contributors include Richard Posner, Arnold Kling, Robert Litan and Viral Acharya)
- Channel 21 (roughly weekly webcasts moderated by Evans with Emilios Avgouleas and Geoffrey Manne, including: Obama’s "White Paper" on Regulation Reform with Robert Litan, Peter Wallison and Lawrence White; A Failure of Capitalism with Richard Posner; Getting Off Track with John B. Taylor; Is One the Right Number? with Wayne Abernathy.
- Podcasts: interviews that usually last about 30 minutes. Some experts that have been interviewed are Bill Isaac, John Reed, and Laura Tyson.
- Profiles of important people in the financial services industry.
- Library Book reviews, testimonies, and thought leadership about the financial services industry. Testimonies content is uploaded from the House Financial Services Committee and Books are updated with upcoming books.
- Who's Who: aims to bring together experts in the industry to interact and network with one another. There are Organization Profiles as well as Individual Profiles on Who's Who.
