= Philipp Strack =

German economist

- Born: 1985 (age 40–41); Bonn, Germany
- Citizenship: German and Greek

Academic background
- Education: Bonn Graduate School of Economics (PhD); University of Bonn (Diplom)
- Doctoral advisor: Paul Heidhues

Academic work
- Discipline: Mechanism design Information economics Behavioral economics
- Institutions: Yale University
- Awards: John Bates Clark Medal (2024)
- Website: Information at IDEAS / RePEc

Philipp Strack (born 1985 in Germany) is a German and Greek economist and Cowles Foundation Professor of Economics at Yale University. He is also Director of the Cowles Foundation. In 2024, he was awarded the John Bates Clark Medal.

== Early life and education ==
Strack was born in Bonn, Germany to a Greek mother and a German father. He earned diploms in economics and mathematics at the University of Bonn, and he completed his PhD in economics at the Bonn Graduate School of Economics in 2013.

== Career ==
From 2013 to 2014, Strack was a postdoctoral fellow at Microsoft Research New England. He became an assistant professor in the economics department at UC Berkeley in 2014, where he became an associate professor in 2018. In 2019, he became an associate professor of economics at Yale University. As of 2022, Strack is a full professor of economics and computer science at Yale.
