= Emily Oster =

American economist

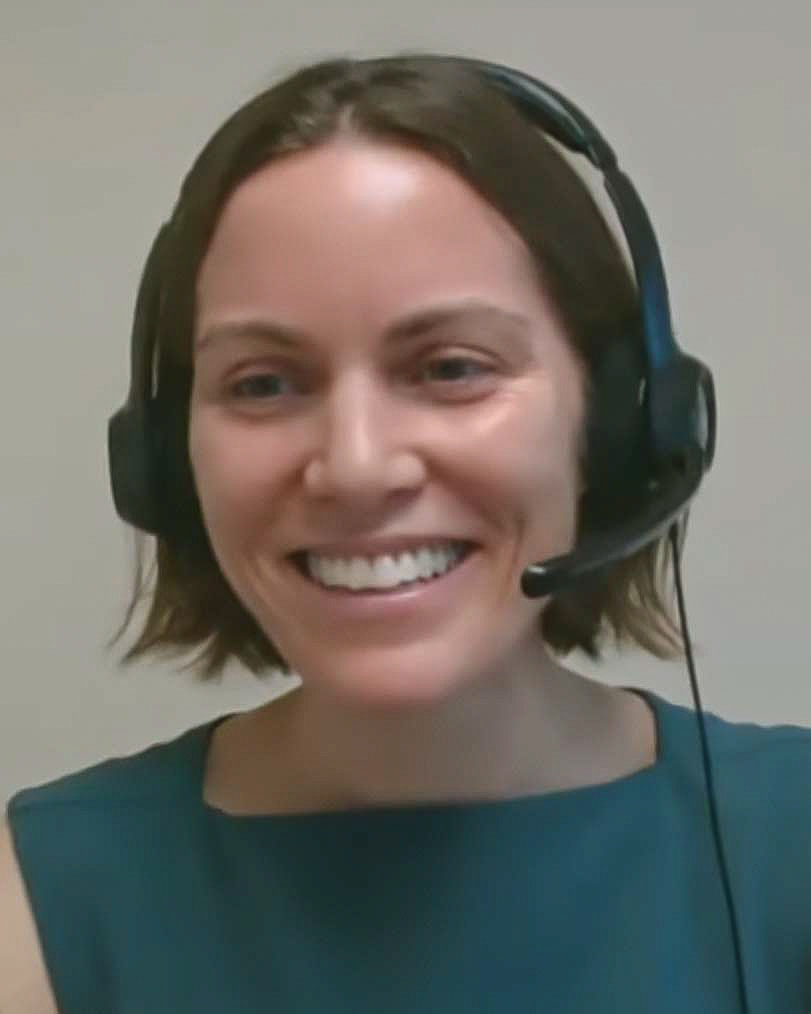
- Oster in 2021
- Born: February 14, 1980 (age 46); New Haven, Connecticut, U.S.
- Occupations: Professor, author
- Spouse: Jesse Shapiro
- Children: 2
- Parent(s): Sharon Oster and Ray Fair

Academic background
- Education: Harvard University (BA, PhD)
- Doctoral advisor: Michael Kremer

Academic work
- Institutions: University of Chicago; Brown University
- Notable works: Expecting Better, Cribsheet, The Family Firm

Emily Fair Oster (born February 14, 1980) is an American economist who has served since 2019 as the Royce Family Professor of Teaching Excellence at Brown University, where she has been a professor of economics since 2015. Her research interests span from development economics and health economics to research design and experimental methodology. Her research was brought to the attention of non-economists through The Wall Street Journal, the book SuperFreakonomics, and her 2007 TED Talk.

Oster is the author of four books, Expecting Better, The Family Firm, The Unexpected, and Cribsheet, which discuss a data-driven approach to decision-making in pregnancy and parenting. Oster is also the founder of ParentData.org, a data-driven parenting information platform.

== Early life ==
Oster was born on February 14, 1980, in New Haven, Connecticut. Her parents, Sharon Oster and Ray Fair, were both professors of economics at Yale University. When she was two years old, Oster's parents noticed that she talked to herself in her crib after they left her room. They placed a tape recorder in her room to find out what she was saying and passed the tapes on to a linguist and psychologist with whom they were friends. Analysis of Oster's speech showed that her language was much more complex when she was alone than when interacting with adults. This led to her being the subject of a series of academic papers that were published in 1989 as a compendium, Narratives from the Crib.

After graduating from Choate Rosemary Hall in 1998, Oster studied economics at Harvard University, graduating in 2002 with a Bachelor of Arts. She then did doctoral studies in economics at Harvard under Michael Kremer. She received a Ph.D. in 2006 with a thesis titled "The Economics of Infectious Disease".

== Career ==
From 2006 to 2007, Oster was a Becker Fellow at the Becker Center on Chicago Price Theory at the University of Chicago, where she was an assistant professor at the Department of Economics from 2007 to 2009, an assistant professor at the Booth School of Business from 2009 to 2011, and an associate professor from 2011 to 2014. In 2015, she became a tenured associate professor of economics at Brown University, where she has been a full professor of economics since 2016 and the Royce Family Professor of Teaching Excellence since 2019. She is also the CEO of ParentData, a data-driven website she founded in 2020 that explores parenting practices.

Since 2015 Oster has been a research associate at the NBER, where she was a faculty research fellow from 2006 to 2015. She has been an associate editor of the Quarterly Journal of Economics since 2014.

Oster's research focuses generally on development economics and health. In 2005, Oster published a dissertation for her economics Ph.D. from Harvard University that suggested that the unusually high ratio of men to women in China was partially due to the effects of the hepatitis B virus. "Hepatitis B and the Case of the Missing Women" pointed to findings that suggested areas with high hepatitis B rates tended to have higher male-to female birth ratios. Oster argued that the fact that hepatitis B can cause women to conceive boys more often than girls accounted for the bulk of the "missing women" in Amartya Sen's 1990 essay "More Than 100 Million Women Are Missing". Oster noted that the use of hepatitis B vaccine in 1982 led to a sharp decline in the male-to-female birth ratio. Sen's essay attributed the "missing women" to societal discrimination against girls and women in the form of the allocation of health, educational, and food resources.

In 2008, Oster released a working paper, "Hepatitis B Does Not Explain Male-Biased Sex Ratios in China", in which she evaluated new data that showed that her original research was incorrect. Freakonomics author Steven Levitt saw this as a sign of integrity.

In a 2007 TED Talk, Oster discussed the spread of HIV in Africa, applying a cost-benefit analysis to the question of why African men have been slow to change their sexual behavior.

In 2026, Oster launched the "Wellness, Actually" Podcast with F. Perry Wilson on iHeartMedia to combat social media misinformation about wellness topics.

== Books ==
In her book Expecting Better, published in 2013, Oster criticizes conventional pregnancy customs, taboos and mores. She discusses the data behind common pregnancy practices and argues that many of them are misleading. As of 2019, the book had sold over 100,000 copies. A revised and updated version of the book was published in 2021.

In the book, Oster argues against the general rule of thumb to avoid alcohol consumption while pregnant, contending that there is no evidence that (low) levels of alcohol consumption by pregnant women adversely affect their children. This claim has drawn criticism from the National Organization on Fetal Alcohol Syndrome and others.

Her second book, Cribsheet, was published in 2019 and was a New York Times best seller. It evaluates and reviews the research on a variety of parenting topics relating to infants and toddlers, including breastfeeding, safe sleep guidelines, sleep training, and potty training. The week of April 28, 2019, Cribsheet was also the best selling book in Washington, D.C.

Her third book, The Family Firm: A Data-Driven Guide to Better Decision Making in the Early School Years, applies to school-age children. A review discusses the relationship of her parenting approach to more permissive parenting ideas dating to the pre-Reagan era. Oster suggests that parents run their families like firms in order to maximize their children's advantage over others.

== COVID-19 and schools ==
Oster was an advocate for opening schools during the COVID-19 pandemic, spearheading a project to collect data on the virus's spread in schools and appearing frequently in media discussing why schools should open. In early October 2020, she wrote an influential and much cited article in The Atlantic, "Schools Aren't Super-Spreaders", which inspired numerous articles. Secretary of Education Betsy DeVos and the CDC cited Oster's work as a reason to open schools during the pandemic. In August 2020, Oster launched a dashboard compiling information on COVID-19's spread in schools. Critics of Oster's dashboard said it had methodological problems that undermined its usefulness.

On May 18, 2021, Oster published another piece in The Atlantic, "Your Unvaccinated Kid Is Like a Vaccinated Grandma", which generated much heated controversy over her treatment of vaccination as an individual risk-reward proposition, insinuation that unvaccinated kids are relatively safe from COVID, and failure to mention that kids spread the infection themselves. Critics said that such rhetoric could lead readers to wrongly conclude there was no urgent need to vaccinate.

In September 2021, Oster launched the COVID-19 School Data Hub, which includes information on virtual and in-person status of schools across 31 states. According to The New York Times, the data hub is "one of the most comprehensive efforts yet to document how schools operated during the pandemic."

== Personal life ==
Emily is the daughter of Sharon Oster and Ray Fair, both professors of economics at Yale University. She married Jesse Shapiro, also an economist, in 2006, and they have two children.
