= Catalyst Code =

2007 book by David S. Evans and Richard L. Schmalensee

The Catalyst Code: The Strategies Behind the World's Most Dynamic Companies
- Author: David S. Evans; Richard L. Schmalensee
- Language: English
- Subject: Business Strategy
- Genre: Non-fiction
- Publisher: Harvard Business School Press
- Publication date: May 9, 2007
- Publication place: United States
- Media type: Hardback
- Pages: 228 pp
- ISBN: 978-1-4221-0199-5
- OCLC: 76073300
- Dewey Decimal: 658/.046 22
- LC Class: HD9999.M78 E94 2007

Catalyst Code: The Strategies Behind the World's Most Dynamic Companies is a book by David S. Evans and Richard L. Schmalensee, published in 2007.

== Overview ==
Evans is the founder of Market Platform Dynamics, and Schmalensee is an economist and former dean of the MIT Sloan School of Management.

Catalyst Code draws on recent advances in economic theory, begun by Jean-Charles Rochet and Jean Tirole, and extensive interviews conducted by the business strategy consulting firm Market Platform Dynamics, with which both authors are affiliated. The book explains how economic catalysts differ from ordinary, single-sided businesses and presents a new six-part framework for devising strategies for launching and sustaining successful catalyst businesses.

Topics discussed include:

- Chapter 1: What is a Catalyst? explores the profound difference between catalyst businesses and the single-sided businesses that tend to economics and business academics.
- Chapter 2: Building a Catalyst Strategy explains the importance of building, stimulating, and governing a catalyst business.
- Chapter 3: Identify the Catalyst Community discusses the need for determining the parameters of the possible communities to be served by a new catalyst business, and uses as examples Tufts-New England Medical Center, YouTube, MySpace.com, Diners Club and DoCoMo.
- Chapter 4: Establish a Pricing Structure looks at the factors involved in creating value propositions that persuade all the necessary groups of customers to begin and continue using the platform.
- Chapter 5: Design the Catalyst for Success explores solving the "chicken-and-egg" problem that is common to catalyst businesses.
- Chapter 6: Focus on Profitability examines profitability issues in a multisided business.
- Chapter 7: Compete Strategically with Other Catalysts looks at competition from both sides - how a catalyst entrepreneur can challenge an entrenched catalyst of today, and how a successful catalyst can defend itself against emerging challengers.
- Chapter 8: Experiment and Evolve advises catalyst business entrepreneurs and executives to embrace experimentation as important in igniting a catalytic reaction and to adopt an evolutionary strategy for growth.
- Chapter 9: Cracking the Catalyst Code warns that creating a successful catalyst business code is complex, especially in niches where both profit opportunities and risks are the greatest.
