= Stefanie Stantcheva =

French economist

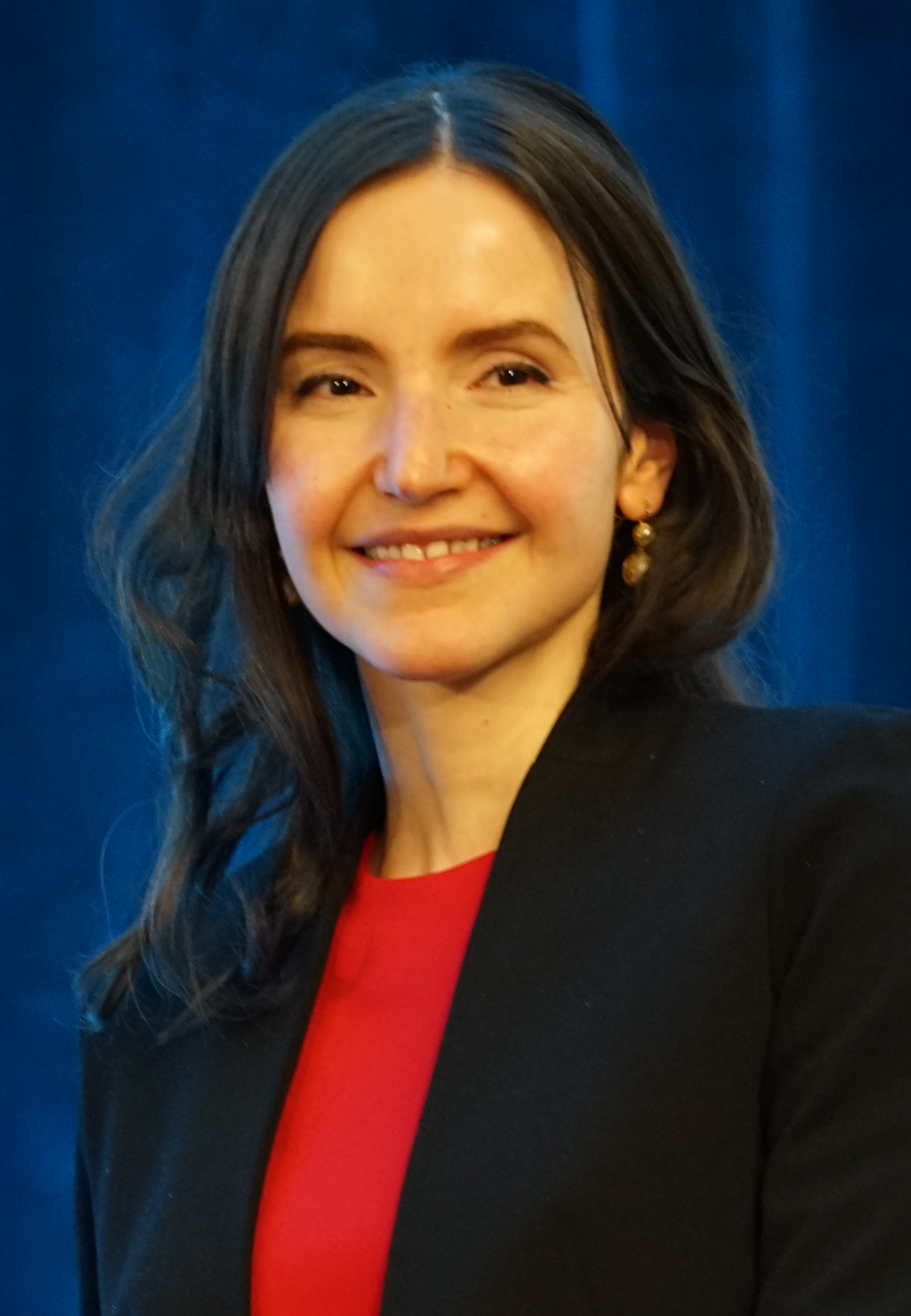
- At John Bates Clark Award 2026
- Born: 21 February 1986 (age 40); Krichim, Bulgaria

Academic background
- Education: Massachusetts Institute of Technology (PhD); Paris School of Economics (MS); ENSAE (MS); École Polytechnique (MS); Gonville and Caius College, Cambridge (BA)
- Doctoral advisor: James M. Poterba; Iván Werning

Academic work
- Discipline: Public economics Optimal taxation
- Institutions: Harvard University
- Notable ideas: Research on optimal taxation
- Awards: John Bates Clark Medal (2025), Elaine Bennett Research Prize (2020)
- Website: Information at IDEAS / RePEc

Stefanie Stantcheva (born 1986) is a French economist who has served as the Nathaniel Ropes Professor of Political Economy at Harvard University since 2021. She has been a member of the Conseil d'Analyse Économique since 2018. In 2018, she was described by The Economist as one of the best young economists of the decade. In 2025, she was awarded the John Bates Clark Medal.

== Early life and education ==
Stantcheva was born in Bulgaria in 1986, and lived in East Germany until the fall of the Berlin Wall in 1989, before moving to France at 3, where she grew up. Stantcheva became interested in economics after witnessing the economic turmoil Bulgaria had during its political and economic transition in the 1990s. She attended the Lycée International de Saint-Germain-en-Laye near Paris, and read economics at Gonville and Caius College, Cambridge, where she received a Bachelor of Arts degree in 2007. She then received a Master of Science degree in economics from the École polytechnique in 2008, and a second MS in economics from the Paris School of Economics and the ENSAE in 2009. She received a PhD in economics from the Massachusetts Institute of Technology in 2014, where she was advised by James Poterba and Iván Werning.

== Career ==
From 2014 to 2016, Stantcheva was a Junior Fellow at the Harvard Society of Fellows. She became an assistant professor at Harvard University in 2016, and an associate professor at Harvard the following year. She became a full professor of economics at Harvard in 2018, and was appointed the Nathaniel Ropes Professor of Political Economy at Harvard in 2021. She was appointed a member of the Conseil d'Analyse Économique in 2018. Stantcheva has been a research associate at the US National Bureau of Economic Research (NBER) since 2018, where she was a faculty research fellow from 2014 to 2018.

She has been an editor of the Quarterly Journal of Economics since 2020. She was elected a Fellow of the Econometric Society in 2021, and was also elected to the American Academy of Arts and Sciences that year.

== Honours ==
- 2017: National Science Foundation CAREER Award,
- 2019: Prix du meilleur jeune économiste de France,
- 2020: Elaine Bennett Research Prize,
- 2021: Prix Maurice Allais de Science Économique in 2021.
- 2021: Recipient of a Carnegie Fellowship.
- 2022: Recipient of a Guggenheim Award.
- 2025: John Bates Clark Medal.

== Social Economics Lab ==
At Harvard, Stantcheva founded the Social Economics Lab, which conducts large-scale online surveys and survey-based experiments to study how people understand economic policies and form views about topics such as taxation, redistribution, trade, climate change, and social mobility. The lab also develops methods for using open-ended survey responses to measure beliefs and reasoning.

The recent work of the Social Economics Lab explores people’s attitudes towards taxation, trade, immigration, climate change, inflation, and social mobility. These Social Economics Surveys are rigorous research tools that can shed light on what is invisible in order datasets: perceptions, beliefs, reasoning, attitudes, views, and detailed individual economic circumstances.

== Research ==
Stantcheva's research concerns public finance and political economy, mixing in elements of macroeconomics. She studies the taxation of firms and individuals, as well as how people understand, perceive, and form their attitudes towards economic issues and policies. Her recent work explores people’s attitudes towards taxation, trade, immigration, climate change, inflation, and social mobility using large-scale Social Economics Surveys and Experiments.

She has also studied the long-lasting effects of tax policy – on innovation, education, and wealth. Stantcheva and co-authors link historical tax policy and R&D policies to inventors’ behavior and firm R&D over the twentieth century, finding that higher personal and corporate tax rates reduce the quantity of inventive activity and shift its location, with limited effects on average quality. She has also researched how personal income and corporate income taxation have shaped innovation over the 20th century ("Taxation and Innovation in the 20th Century"), how top personal tax rates affect the international location choices of superstar inventors, and how student loans can be structured to improve access to education. She has analyzed dynamic optimal taxation with human-capital formation, showing conditions under which income-contingent education loans can be part of optimal policy over the life cycle.

At the Social Economics Lab she founded, she developed the use of large-scale, cross-country Social Economic Surveys and Experiments to study how people form views about economic issues and policies. She particularly focuses on perceptions of intergenerational mobility, immigration, and inequality and their link to support for redistribution. Recent work has studied people's attitudes towards climate change, trade policy, inflation, and zero-sum thinking. She has also published a widely cited practical guide to designing surveys and embedded experiments for economics research.

== Media ==
Stantcheva is often interviewed by French media. Profiles and interviews have discussed Stantcheva’s use of surveys to study how people think about policy. She has also written and spoken publicly about zero-sum thinking, beliefs about inflation, and related topics.

== Editorial and professional service ==
Stantcheva has served as an editor (co-editor) of the Quarterly Journal of Economics since 2020; she was the first woman to join the journal’s editorial board. She is a Research Associate of the National Bureau of Economic Research (Public Economics, Political Economy, and Economic Fluctuations and Growth programs). She is a Research Fellow of the Centre for Economic Policy Research and has been a member of France’s Conseil d’analyse économique since 2018.

== Selected bibliography ==
- Optimal Taxation of Top Labor Incomes: A Tale of Three Elasticities. (with T. Piketty & E. Saez). American Economic Journal: Economic Policy, Vol. 6, No. 1, pp. 230–271, February 2014.
- How elastic are preferences for redistribution? Evidence from randomized survey experiments. (with I. Kuziemko, M. Norton, and E. Saez). American Economic Review. Vol. 105, No. 4, pp. 1478–1508, April 2015.
- Generalized social marginal welfare weights for optimal tax theory. (with E. Saez). American Economic Review 2016, Vol. 106, No.1, pp. 24–45. January 2016.
- Optimal Taxation and Human Capital Policies over the Life Cycle. Journal of Political Economy, Vol. 125, No. 6, pp-1931-1990, 2017.
- Immigration and redistribution. (with A. Alesina & A. Miano) National Bureau of Economic Research, Working Paper 24733, June 2018.
- Intergenerational mobility and preferences for redistribution. (with A. Alesina & E. Teso). American Economic Review. Vol. 108, No. 2, pp. 521–54, February 2018.
