= Richard L. Schmalensee =

American economist

- Richard Lee Schmalensee
- Born: 1944 (age 81–82); Belleville, Illinois

Academic background
- Education: Massachusetts Institute of Technology
- Doctoral advisor: Franklin M. Fisher

Academic work
- Institutions: Massachusetts Institute of Technology
- Doctoral students: Carl Shapiro
- Notable students: Severin Borenstein
- Website: Information at IDEAS / RePEc

Richard Schmalensee is an American economist and academic who is the Howard W. Johnson Professor of Management and Professor of Economics, emeritus, at the Massachusetts Institute of Technology (MIT). His research focuses on industrial organization, antitrust policy, economic regulation, energy markets and environmental policy. He served as dean of the MIT Sloan School of Management from 1998 to 2007 and as a member of the President's Council of Economic Advisers from 1989 to 1991. He has also worked as an economic consultant and expert witness in antitrust and regulatory proceedings, including the United States government's antitrust case against Microsoft.

== Education ==
Schmalensee received a Bachelor of Science degree in economics, politics and science from the Massachusetts Institute of Technology in 1965. He continued his studies at MIT, receiving a PhD in economics in 1970. His doctoral adviser was economist Franklin M. Fisher.

== Career ==
=== Academic career ===
From 1970 to 1977, he taught in the Department of Economics at the University of California, San Diego, first as an assistant professor and then as an associate professor. He returned to MIT in 1977 as an associate professor at the Sloan School of Management and became a professor in 1979. He also held a professorship in MIT's Department of Economics from 1986.

At MIT, Schmalensee held the Gordon Y Billard Professorship of Management from 1988 to 1999. He served as deputy dean of the Sloan School from 1996 to 1998 and became dean in 1998. He was appointed the John C Head III Dean in 2001 and held the position until 2007. From 2007 to 2013, he held the Howard W. Johnson Professorship of Management. He became professor emeritus of management and economics in 2014.

Schmalensee directed MIT's Center for Energy and Environmental Policy Research from 1991 to 1999 and from 2008 to 2012. He also held visiting professorships at Harvard University, Harvard Business School and the Université Catholique de Louvain in Belgium.

He has held editorial positions with several academic journals, including the American Economic Review, the Journal of Industrial Economics and the Journal of Economic Perspectives. He was founding editor of the MIT Press series Regulation of Economic Activity and later became co-editor of the series. He also served as editor-in-chief of Competition Policy International from 2005 to 2008.

Schmalensee has been a research associate of the National Bureau of Economic Research and served on its board of directors from 2013. He also served on the board of Resources for the Future from 2009 and was chair of its board from 2014 to 2018. He served on the Board of Governors of the Asia School of business from 2015 until 2023 and on the Advisory Council of the Tsinghua School of Economics and Management from 2001 to 2007.

=== Government and public service ===
From 1989 to 1991, Schmalensee served as a member of the President's Council of Economic Advisers during the administration of George H. W. Bush.

His other appointments included the U.S. Environmental Protection Agency's Environmental Economics Advisory Committee and Clean Air Act Compliance Analysis Council, which he chaired from 1992 to 1996.

He participated in National Academies and National Research Council committees, including the Committee on America's Climate Choices and the Committee on the Social Cost of Carbon. He chaired the National Academies' Committee for a Study of Freight Rail Transportation and Regulation from 2014 to 2015.

Schmalensee was a member of the National Commission on Energy Policy from 2006 to 2010 and the National Climate Assessment Development and Advisory Committee from 2011 to 2014. He also chaired the MIT Energy Initiative study The Future of Solar Energy (2015) and co-chaired The Future of the Electric Grid (2011).

=== Economic consulting and expert testimony ===
Schmalensee has worked as an economic consultant and expert witness in antitrust and regulatory matters since the early 1970s. He consulted for the U.S. Federal Trade Commission's Bureau of Economics from 1972 to 1981, NERA Economic Consulting from 1981 to 1989 and 1991–2004, and the U.S. Department of Justice's Antitrust Division from 1991 to 1992, including on the 1992 Merger Guidelines. He later held positions at LECG and Global Economics Group and became a senior adviser to Berkeley Research Group in 2023.

He was the main economic witness for Microsoft in United States v. Microsoft Corp., (1999). In Ohio v. American Express Co. (2018), he and David S. Evans submitted an influential amicus brief to the U.S. Supreme Court on two-sided platforms, indirect network effects and platform pricing. In 2021, he testified for Apple in Epic Games, Inc. v. Apple Inc. on platform economics, market definition and competition in digital game transactions.

He served on the boards of directors of the Long Island Lighting Company from 1992 to 1998, the International Securities Exchange from 2000 to 2009, MFS Investment Management from 2002 to 2004, and the International Data Group from 2004 to 2017.

== Research ==
Schmalensee's research focuses on industrial organization, particularly market structure, competition and regulation. His work has addressed market concentration, pricing, advertising, natural monopolies, mergers and government intervention. He has also examined the use of economic analysis in business decision-making and public policy.

His early work included The Economics of Advertising (1972) and The Control of Natural Monopolies (1979). His research on market structure and competition contributed to debates about antitrust policy and the economic assessment of mergers. In "Horizontal Merger Policy: Problems and Changes" (1987), he examined the economic reasoning behind U.S. merger policy and the Department of Justice's merger guidelines.

Schmalensee also known for his research on energy and environmental economics. Working with Paul L. Joskow, he examined electricity markets and utility regulation in Markets for Power: An Analysis of Electric Utility Deregulation (1983). He later co-authored Markets for Clean Air: The U.S. Acid Rain Program (2000), a study of the emissions-trading system established to reduce sulfur dioxide pollution. His work has addressed electricity-market design, renewable energy, energy storage, climate policy and the economic effects of environmental regulation.

Another major area of his research concerns multi-sided platforms, businesses that connect distinct groups of users and whose value to one group depends partly on participation by the other. With David S. Evans, he studied the economics of payment cards, software platforms and digital marketplaces. Their books include Paying with Plastic: The Digital Revolution in Buying and Borrowing (1999), Catalyst Code (2007) and Matchmakers: The New Economics of Multisided Platforms (2016). With Evans and Andrei Hagiu, he also co-authored Invisible Engines: How Software Platforms Drive Innovation and Create Value (2006).

Their work on platform economics has been cited in legal proceedings concerning competition in digital markets, including the Supreme Court's 2018 decision in Ohio v. American Express Co. Schmalensee and Evans continued to examine the implications of that ruling in their 2024 article, "The American Express Decision and Its Critics: Reflections after Five Years."

== Books and selected publications ==
- Schmalensee, Richard (1972). The economics of advertising. Internet Archive. Amsterdam, North-Holland Pub. Co. ISBN 978-0-7204-3180-3.
- Schmalensee, Richard (1978). "Entry Deterrence in the Ready-to-Eat Breakfast Cereal Industry". The Bell Journal of Economics. 9 (2). [RAND Corporation, Wiley]: 305–327. doi:10.2307/3003584. ISSN 0361-915X.
- Stevenson, Rodney; Crew, Michael; Kleindorfer, Paul; Schmalensee, Richard (1981). "Public Utility Economics". Land Economics. 57 (1): 131. doi:10.2307/3145761. ISSN 0023-7639.
- Weiner, Robert; Joskow, Paul L.; Schmalensee, Richard (1985). "Markets for Power: An Analysis of Electric Utility Deregulation". Journal of Policy Analysis and Management. 4 (2): 283. doi:10.2307/3324641. ISSN 0276-8739.
- Schmalensee, Richard (1985). "Do Markets Differ Much?". The American Economic Review. 75 (3). American Economic Association: 341–351. ISSN 0002-8282.
- Schmalensee, Richard; Willig, Robert (1989). Handbook of Industrial Organization. Vol. 1. Elsevier.
- Evans, David S.; Schmalensee, Richard (2004). Paying with Plastic (2nd ed.). The MIT Press. ISBN 978-0-262-27243-8.
- Ellerman, A. Denny; Joskow, Paul L.; Schmalensee, Richard; Montero, Juan-Pablo; Bailey, Elizabeth M. (June 19, 2000). Markets for Clean Air. Cambridge University Press. ISBN 978-0-521-66083-9.
- Evans, David S.; Hagiu, Andrei; Schmalensee, Richard (February 15, 2008). Invisible Engines: How Software Platforms Drive Innovation and Transform Industries. Cambridge, MA, USA: MIT Press. ISBN 978-0-262-55068-0.
- Evans, David S.; Schmalensee, Richard (2007). Catalyst code: the strategies behind the world's most dynamic companies. Boston, Mass: Harvard Business School Press. ISBN 978-1-4221-0199-5.
- Evans, David Sparks; Schmalensee, Richard (2016). Matchmakers: The New Economics of Multisided Platforms. Harvard Business Review Press. ISBN 978-1-63369-172-8.
- Evans, David S.; Schmalensee, Richard (December 4, 2019), Antitrust Analysis of Platform Markets: Why the Supreme Court Got it Right in American Express (SSRN Scholarly Paper), Rochester, NY, 3568448

== Awards and honors ==
- 1982: Elected Fellow of the Econometric Society.
- 1993. Elected Member of the American Economic Association Executive Committee.
- 1995: Elected Member of the American Academy of Arts and Sciences.
- 2012: Named Distinguished Fellow of the Industrial Organization Society.
- 2025: Received the Outstanding Contributions to the Profession award from the International Association for Energy Economics.
