= Fernando Alvarez (economist) =

Argentine macroeconomist

- Born: 1964 (age 61–62)

Academic background
- Doctoral advisor: Edward C. Prescott

Academic work
- Doctoral students: Iván Werning

Fernando Enrique Alvarez (born 1964) is an Argentine macroeconomist. He is professor of economics at the University of Chicago. He received his B.A. in Economics at Universidad Nacional de La Plata in 1989 and his Ph.D. from the University of Minnesota in 1994. He was elected a Fellow of the Econometric Society in 2008. He was named a Fellow of the American Academy of Arts and Sciences in 2018.

Fernando Alvarez's most influential contribution seems to be his work with Urban Jermann (Wharton) on endogenously incomplete markets. They show how the limited commitment model of Timothy Kehoe and David Levine and also of Narayana Kocherlakota can be decentralized with certain borrowing constraints. They also showed how this model could explain some feature of asset prices, such as the equity premium. Several papers have used their model later on to explain other macroeconomic phenomena.

Fernando Alvarez has also presented a new estimate of the welfare cost of business cycles, which is based on observed asset prices (with Urban Jermann). His other work includes models of monetary economies with segmented markets and search models with incomplete markets.

== Published works ==
- Alvarez, Fernando; Veracierto, Marcelo (2012). "Fixed-Term Employment Contracts in an Equilibrium Search Model" (PDF). Journal of Economic Theory. 147 (5): 1725–53. doi:10.1016/j.jet.2012.05.015.
- Alvarez, Fernando; Guiso, Luigi; Lippi, Francesco (2012). "Durable Consumption and Asset Management with Transaction and Observation Costs" (PDF). American Economic Review. 102 (5): 2272–300. doi:10.1257/aer.102.5.2272. hdl:1814/13224. S2CID 15832515.
- Alvarez, Fernando E.; Lippi, Francesco; Paciello, Luigi (2011). "Optimal Price Setting with Observation and Menu Costs" (PDF). The Quarterly Journal of Economics. 126 (4): 1909–60. doi:10.1093/qje/qjr043. S2CID 2700404.
- Alvarez, Fernando; Atkeson, Andrew; Edmond, Chris (2009). "Sluggish Responses of Prices and Inflation to Monetary Shocks in an Inventory Model of Money Demand*". Quarterly Journal of Economics. 124 (3): 911–67. doi:10.1162/qjec.2009.124.3.911.
- Alvarez, Fernando; Lippi, Francesco (2009). "Financial Innovation and the Transactions Demand for Cash" (PDF). Econometrica. 77 (2): 363–402. doi:10.3982/ECTA7451. S2CID 17298975.
- Alvarez, Fernando; Lucas, Robert E.; Jr. (2007). "General Equilibrium Analysis of the Eaton-Kortum Model of International Trade" (PDF). Journal of Monetary Economics. 54 (6): 1726–68. doi:10.1016/j.jmoneco.2006.07.006. S2CID 1465112.
- Alvarez, Fernando; Atkeson, Andrew; Kehoe, Patrick J. (2007). "If Exchange Rates Are Random Walks, Then Almost Everything We Say About Monetary Policy Is Wrong". American Economic Review. 97 (2): 339–45. doi:10.1257/aer.97.2.339.
- Alvarez, Fernando; Jermann, Urban J. (2005). "Using Asset Prices to Measure the Persistence of the Marginal Utility of Wealth". Econometrica. 73 (6): 1977–2016. doi:10.1111/j.1468-0262.2005.00643.x.
- Alvarez, Fernando (2005). "Commentary on 'Organizational Dynamics over the Business Cycle: A View on Jobless Recoveries.'" (PDF). Federal Reserve Bank of St. Louis Review. 87 (4): 581.
- Alvarez, Fernando; Jermann, Urban J. (2004). "Using Asset Prices to Measure the Cost of Business Cycles". Journal of Political Economy. 112 (6): 1223–56. doi:10.1086/424738. Archived from the original on July 18, 2018.
- Alvarez, Fernando; Kehoe, Patrick J.; Andrés Neumeyer, Pablo (2004). "The Time Consistency of Optimal Monetary and Fiscal Policies". Econometrica. 72 (2): 541–67. doi:10.1111/j.1468-0262.2004.00500.x. JSTOR 3598912.
- Alvarez, Fernando; Atkeson, Andrew; Kehoe, Patrick J (2002). "Money, Interest Rates, and Exchange Rates with Endogenously Segmented Markets". Journal of Political Economy. 110 (1): 73–112. doi:10.1086/324389. S2CID 15445591.
- Alvarez, Fernando; Lucas, Robert E. Jr.; Weber, Warren E. (2001). "Interest Rates and Inflation" (PDF). American Economic Review. 91 (2): 219–25. doi:10.1257/aer.91.2.219. JSTOR 2677763.
- Alvarez, Fernando; Jermann, Urban J. (2001). "Quantitative Asset Pricing Implications of Endogenous Solvency Constraints" (PDF). Review of Financial Studies. 14 (4): 1117–51. doi:10.1093/rfs/14.4.1117. JSTOR 2696737. S2CID 154872673.
- Alvarez, Fernando; Veracierto, Marcelo (2001). "Severance Payments in an Economy with Frictions". Journal of Monetary Economics. 47 (3): 477–98. doi:10.1016/S0304-3932(01)00058-7.
- Alvarez, Fernando (2001). "Comment on 'the Benefits of Dollarization When Stabilization Policy Lacks Credibility and Financial Markets Are Imperfect'". Journal of Money, Credit and Banking. 33 (2): 475–81. doi:10.2307/2673911. JSTOR 2673911.
