= Judith Chevalier =

American economist and academic

- Education: Yale University (BA); Massachusetts Institute of Technology (PhD)
- Children: 3
- Awards: Elaine Bennett Research Prize (1999)
- Scientific career
- Fields: Economics
- Workplaces: Harvard University; University of Chicago; Yale University
- Doctoral advisor: Paul L. Joskow; David Scharfstein
- Website: http://som.yale.edu/judith-chevalier

Judith Chevalier is an American economist who serves as the William S. Beinecke Professor of Finance and Economics at Yale University. She is also a Fellow of the Econometric Society, a member of the American Academy of Arts and Sciences, a former co-editor of the American Economic Review and of the RAND Journal of Economics. In 1998, she was the first to receive the Elaine Bennett Research Prize.

== Education and career ==
She graduated from Yale University in 1989 and earned her PhD from Massachusetts Institute of Technology in 1993. She was an assistant professor of economics at Harvard University for a year before taking a position at the University of Chicago Booth School of Business, where she was awarded tenure in 1997. In 2001, she returned to Yale as a professor in the Yale School of Management.

Her research focuses on applied microeconomics, particularly empirical industrial organization studies of e-commerce and the financial industry. She has written widely cited papers about online reviews, with one paper on online book reviews receiving more than 3500 citations. In recent years, she has studied the interaction of consumer reviews and firm behavior, the economics of electronic commerce, and the effects of new technologies on workers, consumers, firms, and regulators. Some of her more recent research focuses on the impact of state regulations in the market for funeral products and services and the taste for leisure as a determinant of occupational choice.

== Selected works ==
- JA Chevalier; D Mayzlin (2006). "The effect of word of mouth on sales: Online book reviews" (PDF). Journal of Marketing Research. 43 (3): 345–354. doi:10.1509/jmkr.43.3.345.
- J Chevalier; G Ellison (1997). "Risk taking by mutual funds as a response to incentives" (PDF). Journal of Political Economy. 105 (6): 1167–1200. doi:10.1086/516389. hdl:1721.1/64058. S2CID 158474211.
- J Chevalier; G Ellison (1999). "Career concerns of mutual fund managers" (PDF). The Quarterly Journal of Economics. 114 (2): 389–432. doi:10.1162/003355399556034.
- J Chevalier; G Ellison (1999). "Are some mutual fund managers better than others? Cross-sectional patterns in behavior and performance" (PDF). The Journal of Finance. 54 (3): 875–899. doi:10.1111/0022-1082.00130.
- JA Chevalier. "Capital structure and product-market competition: Empirical evidence from the supermarket industry". The American Economic Review: 415–435.
- A K Kashyap; JA Chevalier; PE Rossi. "Why Don't Prices Rise During Periods of Peak Demand? Evidence from Scanner Data". American Economic Review. 93 (1): 15–37.
