= William Zame =

American economist and mathematician

William Robin Zame is an American economist and mathematician, and distinguished professor of economics. Dr Zame earned his PhD degree at Tulane University. Before joining the University of California, Los Angeles in 1991, he held appointments in the Mathematics Departments of Rice University, Tulane University and the State University of New York at Buffalo, and in the Economics and Mathematics Departments at The Johns Hopkins University. His research areas are Experimental Economics, Finance, Game Theory, Microeconomic. Research topics include the impact of culture on economic outcomes in diverse societies, informational asymmetries in macroeconomics, experimental financial markets, and a number of topics in machine learning. He is currently Co-Editor of Economic Theory and Associate Editor of Theoretical Economics.
