= Ray Fair =

American economist (born 1942)

- Born: October 4, 1942 (age 84); Fresno, California, U.S.
- Spouse: Sharon Oster

Academic background
- Education: Massachusetts Institute of Technology; Fresno State College
- Doctoral advisor: Robert Solow

Academic work
- Discipline: Macroeconomics
- Institutions: Yale University
- Website: Information at IDEAS / RePEc

Ray Clarence Fair (born October 4, 1942) is an American economist who is a John M. Musser Professor of Economics at Yale University.

== Education and career ==
Fair received his B.A. from Fresno State College in 1964 and his Ph.D. from MIT in 1968. He spent several years at Princeton University before moving to Yale. He is now a professor within the Cowles Foundation and the International Center for Finance.

Fair's teaching and research interests include macroeconomic theory, econometrics, and macroeconometric modeling. He is the author, along with Karl Case of Wellesley College, of the economics textbook Principles of Economics. He has also authored several books pertaining to modeling, including Testing Macroeconometric Models (1994) and Estimating How the Macroeconomy Works (2004).

He is noted for his methods for predicting the outcome of U.S. presidential elections, for which his work has been frequently cited. He published Predicting Presidential Elections and Other Things on this subject in 2002.

Ray Fair maintains a macroeconomic model, data, software and forecasts on his home page and that are also available for free downloading for use on a personal computer. The Fair Model macroeconomic model forecasts for the United States and 38 other countries. His presidential vote equation predicted a Trump victory in 2016.

Fair lives in New Haven, Connecticut. He was married to Sharon Oster, a professor at the Yale School of Management, until her death in 2022. He is the father of Emily Oster, an economist at Brown University.
