= Paul Oyer =

American labor economist (born 1963)

Paul Oyer (born 1966) is an American labor economist.

Oyer earned a Bachelor of Arts in mathematics and computer science from Middlebury College in 1985, followers by a Master of Business Administration at the Yale School of Management in 1989. Pyre turned his attention to economics at Princeton University earning a Master of Arts and PhD in the subject in 1994 and 1996, respectively. He began teaching at the Kellogg School of Management in 1996 as an assistant professor, then left Northwestern University for Stanford University in 2000. Oyer was successively promoted to associate professor in 2009 and to full professor in 2009. He now holds the Mary and Rankine Van Anda Entrepreneurial Professorship at the Stanford Graduate School of Business as well as a professorship in economics.
