= John Bates Clark Medal =

Economics award

The John Bates Clark Medal is awarded by the American Economic Association to "that American economist under the age of forty who is adjudged to have made a significant contribution to economic thought and knowledge." The award is named after the American economist John Bates Clark (1847–1938).

According to The Chronicle of Higher Education, it "is widely regarded as one of the field's most prestigious awards... second only to the Nobel Memorial Prize in Economic Sciences." Many of the recipients went on to receive the Nobel Prizes in their later careers, including the inaugural recipient Paul Samuelson. The award was made biennially until 2007, but from 2009 is now awarded every year because of the growth of the field. Although the Clark medal is billed as a prize for American economists, it is sufficient that the candidates work in the US at the time of the award; US nationality is not necessary to be considered.

== Past recipients ==
Year	Medalists	Institution (at time of receipt)	Alma mater (PhD)	Nationality	Nobel Prize
1947	Paul Samuelson	Massachusetts Institute of Technology	Harvard University	United States	1970
1949	Kenneth E. Boulding	University of Michigan	University of Oxford	United States	
1951	Milton Friedman	University of Chicago	Columbia University	United States	1976
1955	James Tobin	Yale University	Harvard University	United States	1981
1957	Kenneth Arrow	Stanford University	Columbia University	United States	1972
1959	Lawrence Klein	University of Pennsylvania	Massachusetts Institute of Technology	United States	1980
1961	Robert Solow	Massachusetts Institute of Technology	Harvard University	United States	1987
1963	Hendrik S. Houthakker	Harvard University	University of Amsterdam	Netherlands	
1965	Zvi Griliches	Harvard University	University of Chicago	Israel	
1967	Gary Becker	University of Chicago	University of Chicago	United States	1992
1969	Marc Nerlove	Yale University	Johns Hopkins University	United States	
1971	Dale W. Jorgenson	Harvard University	Harvard University	United States	
1973	Franklin M. Fisher	Massachusetts Institute of Technology	Harvard University	United States	
1975	Daniel McFadden	University of California, Berkeley	University of Minnesota	United States	2000
1977	Martin Feldstein	Harvard University	University of Oxford	United States	
1979	Joseph Stiglitz	Princeton University	Massachusetts Institute of Technology	United States	2001
1981	Michael Spence	Harvard University	Harvard University	United States	2001
1983	James Heckman	University of Chicago	Princeton University	United States	2000
1985	Jerry A. Hausman	Massachusetts Institute of Technology	University of Oxford	United States	
1987	Sanford J. Grossman	Princeton University	University of Chicago	United States	
1989	David M. Kreps	Stanford University	Stanford University	United States	
1991	Paul Krugman	Massachusetts Institute of Technology	Massachusetts Institute of Technology	United States	2008
1993	Lawrence Summers	World Bank	Harvard University	United States	
1995	David Card	University of California, Berkeley	Princeton University	Canada	2021
1997	Kevin M. Murphy	University of Chicago	University of Chicago	United States	
1999	Andrei Shleifer	Harvard University	Massachusetts Institute of Technology	United States	
2001	Matthew Rabin	University of California, Berkeley	Massachusetts Institute of Technology	United States	
2003	Steven Levitt	University of Chicago	Massachusetts Institute of Technology	United States	
2005	Daron Acemoglu	Massachusetts Institute of Technology	London School of Economics	Turkey, United States	2024
2007	Susan Athey	Stanford University	Stanford University	United States	
2009	Emmanuel Saez	University of California, Berkeley	Massachusetts Institute of Technology	France	
2010	Esther Duflo	Massachusetts Institute of Technology	Massachusetts Institute of Technology	France	2019
2011	Jonathan Levin	Stanford University	Massachusetts Institute of Technology	United States	
2012	Amy Finkelstein	Massachusetts Institute of Technology	Massachusetts Institute of Technology	United States	
2013	Raj Chetty	Harvard University	Harvard University	United States	
2014	Matthew Gentzkow	University of Chicago	Harvard University	United States	
2015	Roland G. Fryer Jr.	Harvard University	Pennsylvania State University	United States	
2016	Yuliy Sannikov	Princeton University	Stanford University	Ukraine	
2017	Dave Donaldson	Stanford University	London School of Economics	Canada	
2018	Parag Pathak	Massachusetts Institute of Technology	Harvard University	United States	
2019	Emi Nakamura	University of California, Berkeley	Harvard University	United States and Canada	
2020	Melissa Dell	Harvard University	Massachusetts Institute of Technology	United States	
2021	Isaiah Andrews	Harvard University	Massachusetts Institute of Technology	United States	
2022	Oleg Itskhoki	University of California, Los Angeles	Harvard University	Russia and United States	
2023	Gabriel Zucman	Ecole normale supérieure, Paris and University of California, Berkeley	School for Advanced Studies in the Social Sciences (EHESS)	France	
2024	Philipp Strack	Yale University	University of Bonn	Germany	
2025	Stefanie Stantcheva	Harvard University	Massachusetts Institute of Technology	France	
2026	Ludwig Straub	Harvard University	Massachusetts Institute of Technology	Germany	

== See also ==
- List of economics awards
- Yrjö Jahnsson Foundation
- Nakahara Prize
- Gossen Prize
- Fields Medal
- Bernácer Prize
- Elaine Bennett Research Prize
- Prix du meilleur jeune économiste de France
