= Elaine Bennett Research Prize =

Economics award

- Presented by: American Economic Association (AEA)
- Eligibility: Women economists (max 10 years post-PhD)
- Hosted by: Committee on the Status of Women in the Economics Profession (CSWEP)
- Rewards: Research recognition and honor
- Website: www.aeaweb.org/about-aea/committees/cswep/awards/bennett

The Elaine Bennett Research Prize, awarded every year by the American Economic Association, recognizes and honors outstanding research in any field of economics by a woman not more than ten years beyond her Ph.D. Prior to 2023 the award had been given every other year for a woman not more than seven years beyond her PhD. First awarded in 1998 in honor of economist Elaine Bennett, three of the first six winners of this prize have been the first three female winners of the John Bates Clark Medal.

== Past recipients ==
Year	Medalists	Institution at Time of Award	Nationality	Clark Medal
1998	Judith Chevalier	University of Chicago	United States	
2000	Susan C. Athey	Massachusetts Institute of Technology	United States	2007
2002	Esther Duflo	Massachusetts Institute of Technology	France	2010
2004	Marianne Bertrand	University of Chicago	Belgium	
2006	Monika Piazzesi	University of Chicago	Germany	
2008	Amy Finkelstein	Massachusetts Institute of Technology	United States	2012
2010	Erica Field	Harvard University	United States	
2012	Anna Mikusheva	Massachusetts Institute of Technology	Russia	
2014	Emi Nakamura	Columbia University	United States and Canada	2019
2016	Marina Halac	Columbia University and the University of Warwick	Argentina	
2018	Melissa Dell	Harvard University	United States	2020
2020	Stefanie Stantcheva	Harvard University	France	2025
2022	Rebecca Diamond	Stanford University	United States	
2023	Maya Rossin-Slater	Stanford University	United States	
2024	Maryam Farboodi	MIT Sloan School of Management	Iran	
2025	Mira Frick	Princeton University	German	

== See also ==
- List of awards honoring women
- List of economics awards
- John Bates Clark Medal
