= Econometrica =

- Discipline: Economics
- Language: English
- Edited by: Marina Halac

Publication details
- History: 1933–present
- Publisher: Wiley-Blackwell on behalf of the Econometric Society
- Frequency: Bimonthly
- Impact factor: 5.844 (2020)

Standard abbreviations
- ISO 4: Econometrica

Indexing
- CODEN: ECMTA7
- ISSN: 0012-9682 (print); 1468-0262 (web)
- LCCN: 34016980
- JSTOR: 00129682
- OCLC no.: 01567366

Links
- Journal homepage; Online access; Online archive

Econometrica is a peer-reviewed academic journal of economics, publishing articles in many areas of economics, especially econometrics. It is published by Wiley-Blackwell on behalf of the Econometric Society. The current editor-in-chief is Marina Halac.

== History ==
Econometrica was established in 1933. Its first editor was Ragnar Frisch, recipient of the first Nobel Memorial Prize in Economic Sciences in 1969, who served as an editor from 1933 to 1954. Although Econometrica is currently published entirely in English, the first few issues also contained scientific articles written in French.

== Indexing and abstracting ==
Econometrica is abstracted and indexed in:

- Scopus
- EconLit
- Social Sciences Citation Index

According to the Journal Citation Reports, the journal has a 2020 impact factor of 5.844, ranking it 22/557 in the category "Economics".

== Awards issued ==
The Econometric Society aims to attract high-quality applied work in economics for publication in Econometrica through the Frisch Medal. This prize is awarded every two years for an empirical or theoretical applied article published in Econometrica during the past five years.

== Notable papers ==
Even apart from those being awarded with the Frisch medal, numerous Econometrica articles have been highly influential in economics and social sciences, including:

- Frisch, Ragnar; Waugh, Frederick V. (1933). "Partial Time Regressions as Compared with Individual Trends". Econometrica. 1 (4): 387–401. doi:10.2307/1907330. JSTOR 1907330.
- Evsey D., Domar (1946). "Capital Expansion, Rate of Growth, and Employment". Econometrica. 14 (2): 137–147. doi:10.2307/1905364. JSTOR 1905364.
- Muth, John F. (1961). "Rational Expectations and the Theory of Price Movements". Econometrica. 29 (3): 315–335. doi:10.2307/1909635. JSTOR 1909635.
- Pratt, J. W. (1964). "Risk Aversion in the Small and in the Large". Econometrica. 32 (1–2): 122–136. doi:10.2307/1913738. JSTOR 1913738.
- Kahneman, Daniel; Tversky, Amos (1979). "Prospect Theory: An Analysis of Decision under Risk". Econometrica. 47 (2): 263–291. doi:10.2307/1914185. JSTOR 1914185.
- Sims, Christopher A. (1980). "Macroeconomics and Reality". Econometrica. 48 (1): 1–48. doi:10.2307/1912017. JSTOR 1912017.
- White, Halbert (1980). "A Heteroskedasticity-Consistent Covariance Matrix Estimator and a Direct Test for Heteroskedasticity". Econometrica. 48 (4): 817–838. doi:10.2307/1912934. JSTOR 1912934.
- Engle, Robert F. (1982). "Autoregressive Conditional Heteroscedasticity with Estimates of the Variance of United Kingdom Inflation". Econometrica. 50 (4): 987–1007. doi:10.2307/1912773. JSTOR 1912773.
- Kydland, Finn E.; Prescott, Edward C. (1982). "Time to Build and Aggregate Fluctuations". Econometrica. 50 (6): 1345–1370. doi:10.2307/1913386. JSTOR 1913386.
- Engle, Robert F.; Granger, C. W. J. (1987). "Co-Integration and Error Correction: Representation, Estimation, and Testing" (PDF). Econometrica. 55 (2): 251–276. doi:10.2307/1913236. JSTOR 1913236. S2CID 16616066.
- Aghion, Philippe; Howitt, Peter (1992). "A Model of Growth Through Creative Destruction". Econometrica. 60 (2): 323–351. doi:10.2307/2951599. hdl:1721.1/63839. JSTOR 2951599.
- Melitz, Marc J. (2003). "The Impact of Trade on Intra-Industry Reallocations and Aggregate Industry Productivity". Econometrica. 71 (6): 1695–1725. doi:10.1111/1468-0262.00467.
