= Catherine Wolfram =

American micro-economist

Catherine D. Wolfram
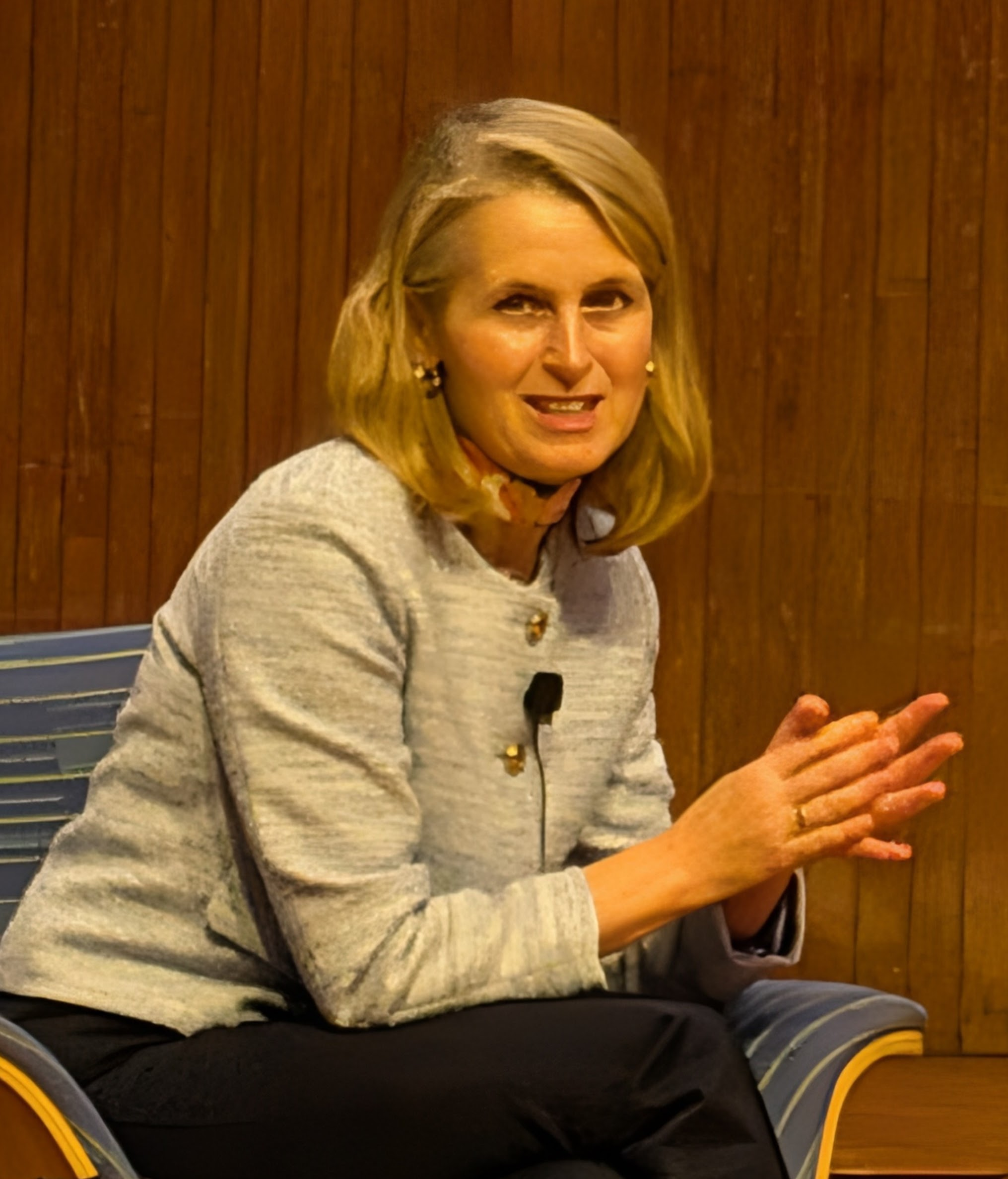
- Occupations: Micro-economist, academic and researcher
- Spouse: Matthew A Barmack

Academic background
- Education: A.B., Economics; Ph.D., Economics
- Alma mater: Harvard University; MIT
- Thesis: "Empirical Studies of the British Electricity Industry Before and After Privatization"
- Doctoral advisor: Paul Joskow
- Website: catherine-wolfram.com

Catherine D. Wolfram is an American micro-economist, academic, and researcher who is the William Barton Rogers Professor in Energy and a professor of Applied Economics at the MIT Sloan School of Management. Previously, she served as a Cora Jane Flood Professor of Business Administration and associate dean for academic affairs at the Haas School of Business at University of California, Berkeley where she also served as a faculty director of The E2e Project and as scientific director for energy and the environment at Center for Effective Global Action. She also directed the National Bureau of Economic Research's Environment and Energy Economics Program.

In March 2021, Wolfram was named as the United States Department of the Treasury Deputy Assistant Secretary for Climate and Energy Economics.

Wolfram specializes in the economics of energy industries in the U.S. and other countries. She has worked on analyzing rural electrification programs in the developing world, the effects of environmental regulation on energy markets, and on developing statistical measures for improving business and policy decisions.

Wolfram is a faculty affiliate at J-PAL, and a senior policy scholar for Georgetown Center for Business and Public Policy.

== Education ==
Wolfram studied economics and received her bachelor's degree from Harvard University in 1989 and her doctoral degree from MIT in 1996.

== Career ==
Wolfram became an assistant professor of economics at Harvard University in 1996. In 2000, she left Harvard University and joined UC Berkeley's Haas School of Business as an assistant professor and was later promoted to associate professor in 2005. Wolfram was appointed as a Cora Jane Flood Professor of Business Administration at Haas School of Business in 2013, a role she held until June 2023. Wolfram was also a visiting professor at the Harvard Kennedy School from October 2022 to June 2023.

At UC Berkeley, Wolfram was appointed as faculty director of the Energy Institute at Haas in 2009, and as a faculty director of E2e Project in 2013. She also served as a scientific director for energy and the environment at Berkeley's Center for Effective Global Action.

In 2016, Wolfram was appointed as a program director of the environmental and energy economics program at the National Bureau of Economic Research.

At UC Berkeley's Haas School of Business, she also served as Associate Dean for Academic Affairs initially in an acting capacity from July 2018 to June 2019, and then in a regular capacity from July 2019 to February 2021.

In 2025, she chaired a Harvard–MIT working group whose report helped shape the Open Coalition on Compliance Carbon Markets, announced at 2025 United Nations Climate Change Conference.

== Research ==
Wolfram's work is focused on economics of energy industries. She has conducted numerous research projects focusing on energy and environmental economics. She has worked on analyzing rural electrification programs in the developing world, energy efficiency programs in the US, the effects of environmental regulation on energy markets, and on developing statistical measures for improving business and policy decisions. Wolfram's later work focuses on randomized controlled trials regarding the energy policy in both developed and developing countries.

=== Economics of energy industry ===
Wolfram studied the bidding behavior regarding the daily electricity auction in U.K., and found that bidding applies to all infra-marginal units if set at a high equilibrium price. She published a paper in the late 1990s on an empirical study on Britain's electricity industry, and derived price-cost markup estimates via approaches not relying on cost data. Her study indicated that prices were lower than the range predicted by the theoretical models, and highlighted various factors for the price levels.

Wolfram studied the work of Fred Kahn and discussed the technological advancements in the energy industry along with the constraints regarding proliferation of time-varying electricity pricing. In late 2010s, she published an article about the Weatherization Assistance Program and found the upfront investment costs to be twice the actual value of the energy savings.

=== Rural electrification in developing countries ===
Wolfram has conducted a number of studies regarding energy demand in the developing world. She argued that the forecasts for energy demand in the emerging economies of the world are understated and that these countries will play a major role in driving medium-run growth in energy consumption.

Wolfram conducted a study on electrification for under grid households in rural Kenya. She provided evidence for low electrification rates despite the investments in grid infrastructure.

=== Privatization and restructuring in the US and UK ===
Wolfram published a paper in 1999 regarding the duopoly power in the British electricity spot market and presented the results of an empirical study that indicated the prices to be higher than the marginal costs but still lower than the range predicted by most theoretical models. She also provided possible explanations for the observed price levels.

In mid 2000s, Wolfram authored a paper assessing the impact of electricity industry restructuring on generating plant operating efficiency using the plant-level data. Her study indicated that the largest reductions in nonfuel operating expenses and employment were experienced by the investor-owned utility plants in restructured environments. Wolfram's study on cost minimization in regulated environments indicated modest medium-term efficiency benefits from replacing regulated monopoly with a market-based industry structure.

=== Climate coalition and carbon markets ===
In 2025, Wolfram chaired the Working Group on Climate Coalitions of the Global Climate Policy Project at Harvard University and the Massachusetts Institute of Technology (MIT) and oversaw the preparation of its flagship report, Building a Climate Coalition: Aligning Carbon Pricing, Trade, and Development, for which she was a core author. The report proposed coordination among countries on industrial carbon pricing and border carbon adjustments, alongside differentiated arrangements, climate finance, and technological support for lower-income countries. Wolfram was also a member of the COP30 President's Council on Economics, Finance, and Climate, an independent group of economists and experts convened at the request of COP30 president-designate André Corrêa do Lago. In June 2025, she presented the climate-coalition proposal at an official event hosted by the Brazilian government.

== Public service ==
Wolfram entered public service in March 2021 when she was appointed Deputy Assistant Secretary for Climate and Energy Economics at the United States Department of the Treasury, where she served until October 2022. During her tenure at the U.S. Treasury Department, Wolfram was instrumental in the development and implementation of a global oil price cap on Russian crude oil, set at $60 per barrel, in response to Russian invasion of Ukraine. The measure was a novel sanctioning tool that aimed to simultaneously maintain Russian oil in the global market while cutting its revenues, a dual strategy that proved successful. Wolfram, who specializes in energy economics, was integral in formulating this approach.

== Awards and honors ==
- 1996 – Review of Economic Studies Tour
- 1998–1999 – National Science Foundation Award for Beginning Academics (Grant No. SBR-9810402)
- 2006 and 2008 – Cheit Award for Best Teacher in the Haas Evening MBA Program
- Barbara and Gerson Bakar Faculty Fellow
- 2022 – Adelman-Frankel Award, United States Association for Energy Economics
- 2023 – Fellow of the Association of Environmental and Resource Economists
- 2024 – John Kenneth Galbraith Award, Agricultural & Applied Economics Association
- 2025 – Elected member of the American Academy of Arts and Sciences
- 2026 – Elected member of the National Academy of Sciences
- 2026 – Member of the Council on Foreign Relations

== Bibliography ==
=== Books ===
- The Design and Implementation of US Climate Policy (2012) ISBN 978-0226269146
- Environmental and Energy Policy and the Economy: Volume 1 (2020) ISBN 978-0226711201

=== Selected articles ===
- Wolfram, Catherine D. (1999). "Measuring Duopoly Power in the British Electricity Spot Market". The American Economic Review. 89 (4): 805–826.
- Fabrizio, Kira R.; Rose, Nancy L.; Wolfram, Catherine D. (September 25, 2007). "Do Markets Reduce Costs? Assessing the Impact of Regulatory Restructuring on US Electric Generation Efficiency". American Economic Review. 97 (4): 1250–1277. doi:10.1257/aer.97.4.1250.
- Wolfram, Catherine; Shelef, Orie; Gertler, Paul (February 25, 2012). "How Will Energy Demand Develop in the Developing World?". Journal of Economic Perspectives. 26 (1): 119–138. doi:10.1257/jep.26.1.119.
- Fowlie, Meredith; Greenstone, Michael; Wolfram, Catherine (2018). "Do Energy Efficiency Investments Deliver? Evidence From The Weatherization Assistance Program". Quarterly Journal of Economics. 133 (3): 1597–1644.
- Lee, Kenneth; Miguel, Edward; Wolfram, Catherine (April 25, 2020). "Experimental Evidence on the Economics of Rural Electrification". Journal of Political Economy. 128 (4): 1523–1565. doi:10.1086/705417.
