= 2025 United Nations Climate Change Conference =

30th UN climate conference

- Part of United Nations Climate Change Conference

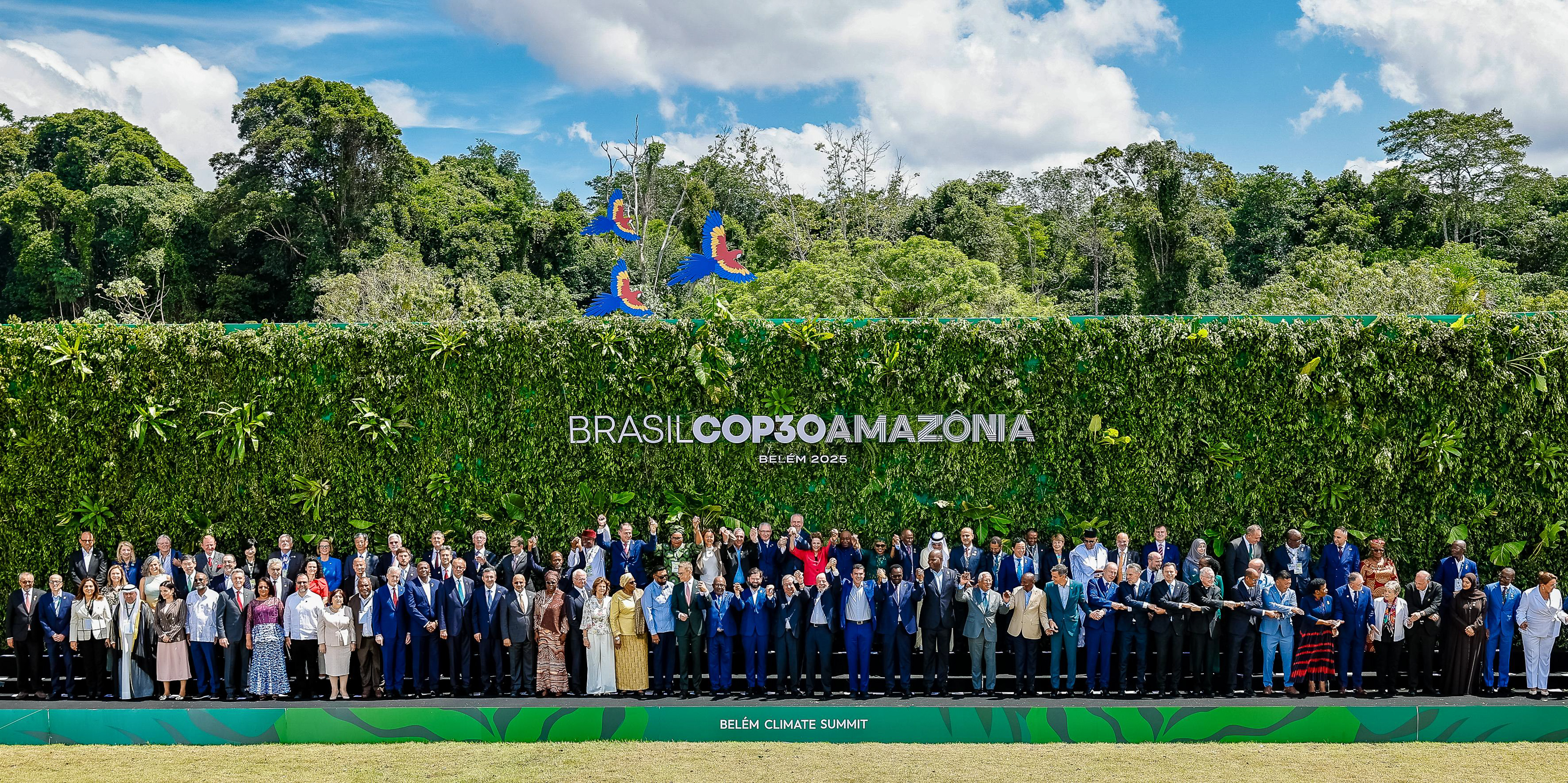
- Date: 10–21 November 2025
- Duration: 11 days
- Location: Belém, Pará, Brazil; 1.4216°S 48.4561°W
- Also known as: COP30
- Previous event: ← Baku 2024
- Next event: → Antalya 2026
- Website: https://cop30.br

The 2025 United Nations Climate Change Conference or Conference of the Parties to the UNFCCC, more commonly known as COP30, was the 30th session of the United Nations Climate Change Conference. It was held at the Hangar Convention Centre in Belém, Brazil, from 10 to 21 November 2025.

Agreeing on an explicit plan or roadmap for phasing out fossil fuels was the most contentious issue. Oil producing nations blocked any binding language so the COP30 president, André Corrêa do Lago, announced two voluntary roadmaps outside the formal UN process.

The published conference text agreed upon after final negotiations was a compromise. Its main points were:

1. Tripling climate adaptation finance by 2035 but without clarity on who pays.
2. A Just Transition Mechanism (JTM) to support fairness in moving to a green economy.
3. Adoption of 59 global indicators for tracking adaptation progress.

Commentators considered the overall outcome to have been weak.

== Pre-conference ==
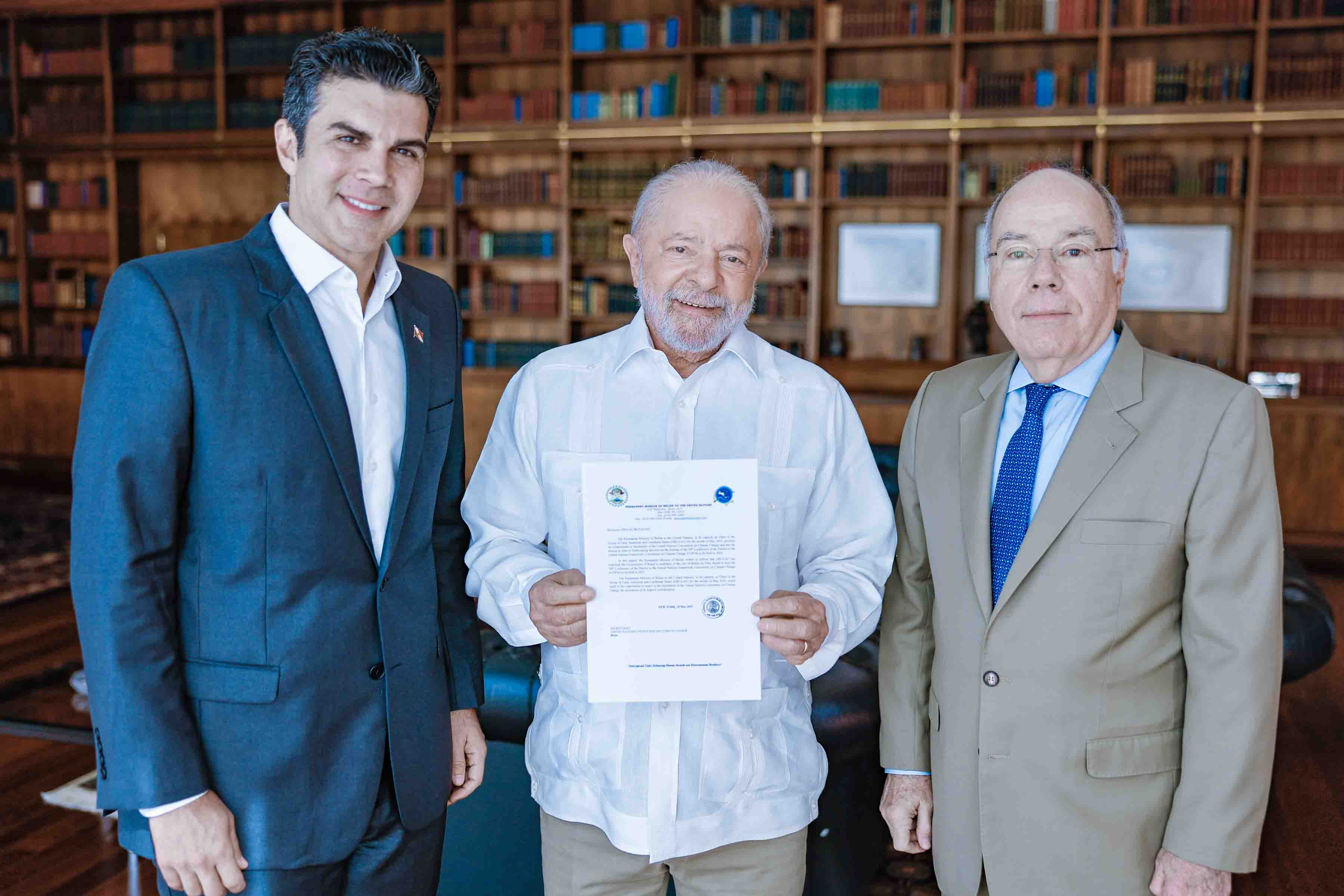
Helder Barbalho, Luiz Inácio Lula da Silva, and Mauro Vieira when Belém was announced to be hosting the event, May 2023

The city's candidacy was announced in 2022 by Brazilian President Luiz Inácio Lula da Silva during his visit to COP27, held in Sharm El Sheikh, Egypt, and was made official in January 2023.

A series of construction and revitalization projects were undertaken by the local government to improve the city's infrastructure using sustainable methods. A new public square was built along one of the city's main avenues, and upgrades were made to the sewage and flood-prevention systems.

In January 2025, President Lula da Silva appointed Brazilian diplomat André Corrêa do Lago as president of COP30. The decision was welcomed by climate activists, given Lago's experience in climate negotiations and leadership in climate justice discussions. Lago is a veteran diplomat at the Ministry of Foreign Affairs who has served as a longtime climate negotiator.

On 4 November 2025, President Lula da Silva signed a law temporarily symbolically transferring the Brazilian national capital from Brasília to Belém for the duration of COP30, from 11 to 21 November 2025. During this period, all acts and orders from the President, ministers, and other federal agencies must be signed and registered in Belém. Additionally, the executive, legislative, and judiciary branches may conduct their activities from the COP30 host city. The law was approved by the Brazilian National Congress on 7 October 2025.

=== Organizational challenges ===
Preparations for Belém to host COP30 faced several challenges, including an accommodation shortage and controversies related to urban infrastructure projects. Broader concerns were also raised about pollution, social inequality, and deforestation in the Amazon.

The former aircraft field in Souza, which had contained several abandoned aircraft since at least 2010 including an EMB-110 Bandeirante (Ex Votec, PT-GJB) and an EMB-110P1 Bandeirante (Ex TABA Transportes Aéreos Regionais da Bacia Amazónica, PT-OHE) as well as other aircraft at nearby locations, was cleared to make way for a public square called Parque da Cidade. It was unclear whether the removed aircraft materials, such as aluminium, were properly recycled, and some trees were also removed during the process.

==== Accommodation ====
Months before the event, reports emerged of extreme price increases for lodging. Some listings on platforms such as Airbnb were priced as high as US$9,320 per day, compared with typical rates of around US$11, while a single-person flat on Booking.com was listed for US$15,266 per night. These figures fueled claims of widespread real estate speculation, with the Brazilian government describing the prices as "extremely high and incomprehensible".

In response, the Federal government of Brazil announced measures to address excessive lodging prices and stated it would make 26,000 additional beds available by using cruise ships, schools, new hotels, and military facilities. However, a previously announced price-regulation agreement with the hotel industry remained unsigned by July 2025 due to resistance from the sector. The government rented two cruise ships, the MSC Seaview and the Costa Diadema, moored at Pier Outeiro in Brasília for the 15-day event. These ships, which were the largest passenger vessels to dock in the city, offered rooms at a minimum rate of approximately US$220 per day.

The lodging crisis prompted a strong international reaction, with 27 countries signing a letter requesting solutions and some nations pressuring Brazil to relocate the event. High costs remained the main obstacle for attendees; a UN survey in August 2025 found that only 18 of 147 responding countries had secured accommodation. The situation led some delegations, including Austria’s, to cancel their participation and affected local tenants, who reported being asked by landlords to vacate their homes for higher-paying visitors. Several official delegations also opted to send fewer representatives to COP30 due to the accommodation shortage and inflated room prices, as reported by The Guardian ahead of the event's opening.

For the first time among visiting VIP aircraft at Belém Airport, an A330-200 from China, an A330-200 from the French government, an A340-300 from Qatar, and an A350-900 from the German government landed at the airport.

==== Highway construction controversy ====
Another point of contention was the construction of a new four-lane highway, Avenida Liberdade. A BBC report in March 2025 stated that the project was underway to ease traffic in preparation for COP30. The project drew criticism from conservationists and local residents for its potential impact on the Amazon rainforest, biodiversity, and nearby communities. Official organizers and the state government of Pará disputed any connection between the highway and the conference. The organizers described the BBC's headline as "misleading," stating that the project was not a federal responsibility and was not part of the official COP30 infrastructure plan. The state government similarly denied the link, noting that the highway had been planned as early as 2020—before Belém was selected as the host city—and received no federal funding for its construction. Critics noted that while the project had been discussed since 2012, the conference may have provided a final justification to begin construction. The state of Pará had also previously cited COP30 as one of the interests served by the project.

== Costs ==
COP30 is said to have cost the Brazilian government R$946.9 million in contracts with the Estados Ibero-Americanos (OEI), but total expenses may have reached around R$5 billion, including additional costs such as the rental of cruise ships. On the other hand, exhibition spaces started at US$1,250 per m^{2} for the lowest tier, with higher-priced options available. Bronze: Starts at US$1,250 per m^{2}. Silver: US$1,350 per m^{2}. Gold: US$1,500 per m^{2}.

== Attendance ==
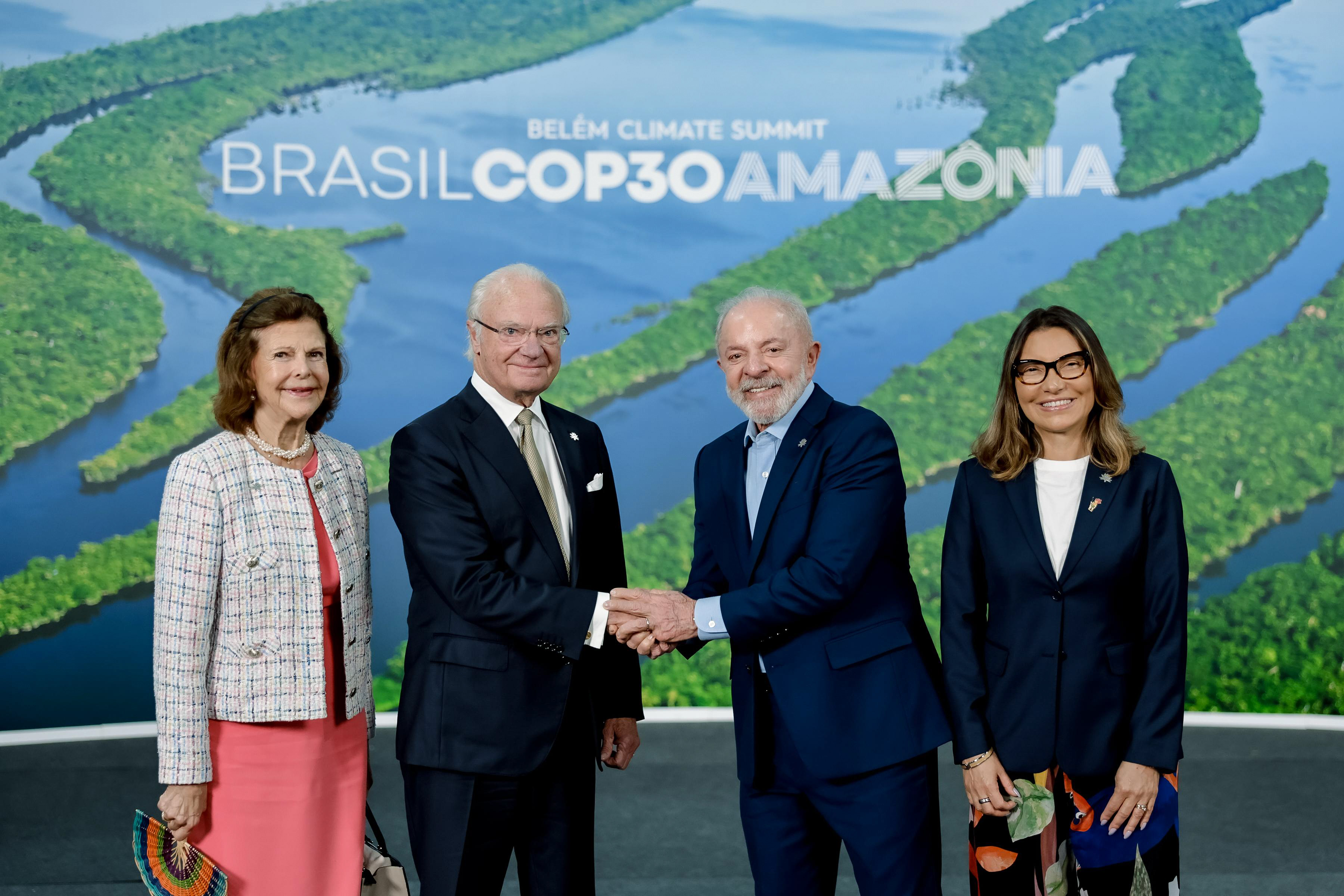
President of Brazil Luiz Inácio Lula da Silva with Silvia and Carl XVI Gustaf of Sweden

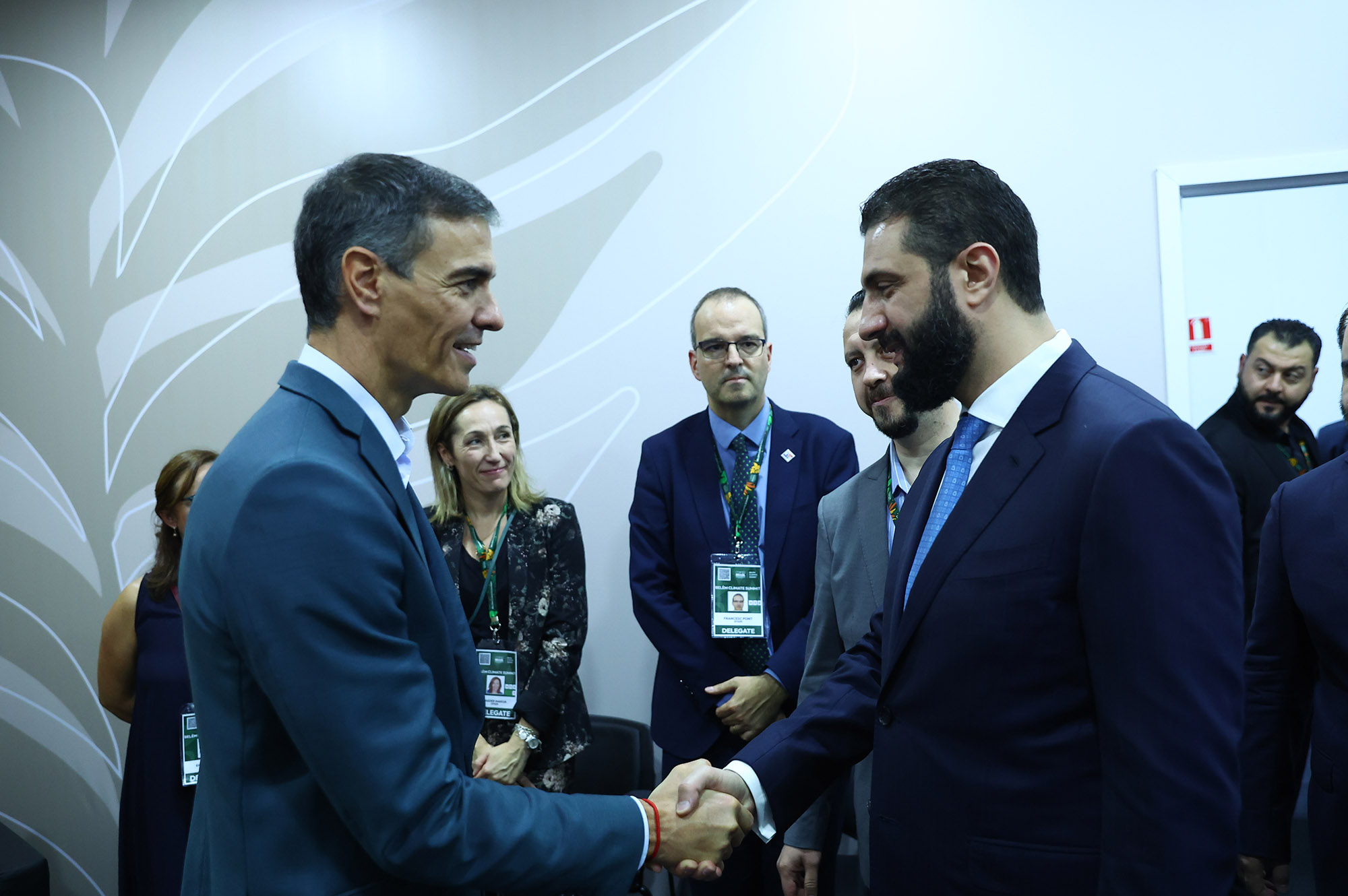
Spanish Prime Minister Pedro Sánchez and Syrian President Ahmed al-Sharaa

The United States for the first time in COP history did not send representatives to the summit, after the Trump administration closed its office of climate diplomacy. However, California Governor Gavin Newsom attended to promote his state's environmental commitments and to form international partnerships. The California governor vocally criticized Trump and his administration for withdrawing from the summit and regressing on various climate goals. Newsom led an alternate US delegation which comprised more than 100 elected US officials, and was part of the US Climate Alliance of 24 governors.

COP30 was the second-largest COP in history with 56,118 delegates registered, behind only COP28 in Dubai which was attended by more than 80,000 people. Host country Brazil had the largest delegation with 3,805 people registered, followed by China (789) and Nigeria (749).

In addition to these figures, other significant delegations included Indonesia (566), Democratic Republic of the Congo (556), France (530), Chad (528), Australia (494), Tanzania (465), and Japan (461). While the provisional numbers provide a snapshot of in‑person attendance, over 5,000 virtual delegates were registered to participate remotely.

Observers, including NGOs and intergovernmental organizations, were also present. According to a UNFCCC document, over 39,000 nominations were submitted from NGOs and IGOs, but the quota for admitted observers was capped at 9,500 due to venue capacity and security constraints.

A point of controversy was the presence of fossil fuel lobbyists, with approximately 1,600 participants from oil, gas, and coal sectors — about 1 in every 25 attendees, according to the Kick Big Polluters Out (KBPO) coalition. Among them, 531 were associated with carbon capture and storage (CCS) companies, per a report by the Center for International Environmental Law (CIEL).

== Conference issues ==
One European aid charity, Christian Aid, stated the three main outcomes they would be looking for:

1. agreement among developed country governments on "how they would provide the $300bn in climate finance that they committed to at COP29";
2. all governments to "commit to stopping new investments in fossil fuels" and to support a just mechanism allowing developed countries at national level to transition to low carbon economies in a socially just way;
3. more ambitious commitments from countries aiming to go beyond their existing commitments and to submit suitably ambitious future climate change plans.

Specific conference issues for discussion and decision included:

=== Nationally determined contributions ===
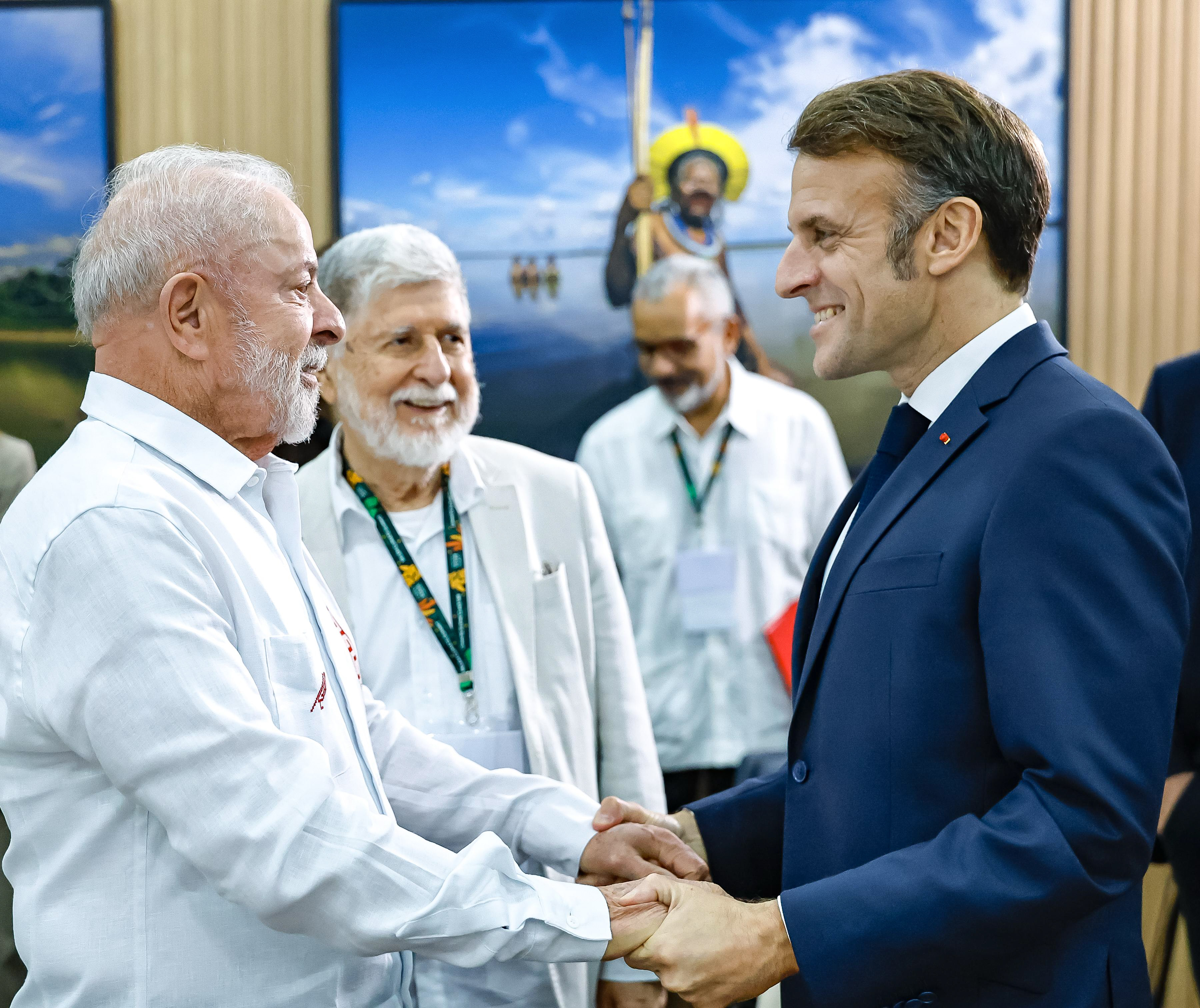
Brazilian President Lula da Silva with French President Emmanuel Macron

The updated Nationally Determined Contributions (NDCs), as outlined in the Paris Agreement, were to be submitted by every country by February 2025. By April 2025, only 19 countries had submitted theirs. By September 2025, around 100 countries had submitted or unveiled new climate targets. After analyzing 64 new NDCs submitted between January and September 2025, along with the climate targets of other countries, the United Nations suggested that global emissions could fall by 10% by 2035 compared to 2019 levels. This projection assumed that the United States continued its climate policy from the Biden administration. Even with this reduction, emissions would remain far below the 60% reduction needed to limit global warming to 1.5 °C. On 11 November, after receiving NDCs from 113 parties, the UN revised its estimate for emissions reductions by 2035 to 12%.

=== Super Pollutants ===
The Climate and Clean Air Coalition launched the Super Pollutant Country Action Accelerator, a program designed to help governments reduce super pollutant emissions.. The initiative aims to engage up to 30 countries by 2030 and to mobilize US$150 million. Seven countries—Brazil, Cambodia, Indonesia, Kazakhstan, Mexico, Nigeria, and South Africa—were chosen for their strong climate policies and will receive an initial package of US$25 million to advance their efforts.

The term “super pollutants” refers to atmospheric pollutants with a greater global warming potential per tonne than carbon dioxide and which are responsible for roughly half of current global warming. These include methane (contributing about 30% of current warming), carbon monoxide and NMVOCs (together contributing about 10%), fluorinated gases, nitrous oxide, and black carbon (each contributing around 5%). Some of these pollutants also cause air pollution, and several have relatively short atmospheric lifetimes. Therefore, reducing their emissions can deliver rapid benefits for both the climate and air quality.

=== Baku to Belém Roadmap to 1.3T ===
Parties at COP29 in Baku agreed for "all actors to work together to enable the scaling up of financing to developing country parties for climate action from all public and private sources to at least USD 1.3 trillion per year by 2035", as the "Baku to Belém Roadmap to 1.3T". Negotiations were expected on how international climate finance would be scaled from the $300 billion agreed in Baku to the $1.3 trillion.

=== Tropical Forest Forever Facility ===
Brazil, the COP30 presidency, launched the Tropical Forest Forever Facility (TFFF) as a signature achievement in Belém. The US$125 billion blended-finance investment fund aims to finalise investments from sovereign funders by COP30 and begin payouts to reward forest conservation in tropical countries in 2026.

Further details were expected after the SB 62 conference in Bonn in June 2025.

=== Climate Coalition ===
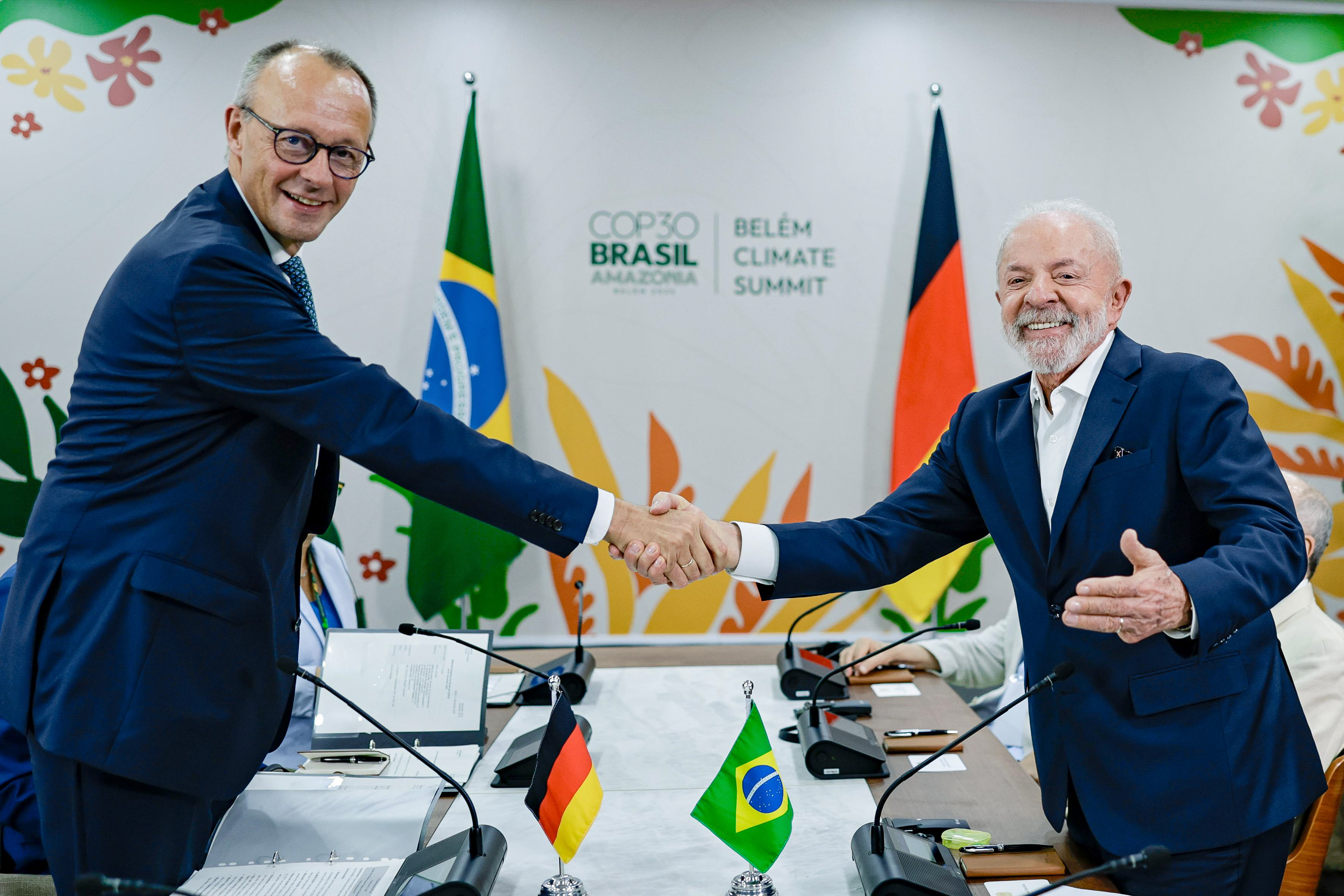
German Chancellor Friedrich Merz and Brazilian President Lula da Silva

Brazil proposed a Climate Coalition to integrate carbon markets, including a border carbon adjustment for non-members, similar to the G7 climate club initiative. This was the country's main proposal for the 2025 United Nations Climate Change Conference. The plan aims to establish a global emissions cap starting at a level close to current emissions and then gradually reducing it until reaching net zero by 2050. For any activity that generates emissions, participants would be required to purchase allowances. As the cap declines, allowance prices would rise, creating an incentive for decarbonization. A border adjustment mechanism would also be implemented and jointly governed by all participants. Lower-income countries may pay reduced amounts or be exempt from some costs, and part of the revenue would be used to support their climate-related needs. The proposal was considered a potential major outcome of COP30.

Rafael Dubeux, deputy executive secretary of Brazil's Ministry of Finance, stated: "All that is needed is a coalition strong enough to move forward. If it includes Brazil, the EU, and China, it could encourage others to join. Another relevant player is California, which—if it were a country—would rank as the world's fourth-largest economy." He added, “We expect to have a joint declaration from countries at COP30 to establish the coalition.”

A report from Harvard University and the Massachusetts Institute of Technology suggests the initiative could lead to:

- Coalition members reducing emissions seven times faster than they do today.
- Approximately USD 200 billion per year for clean-energy and social programs.
- A moderate rise in prices in certain industries, with minimal losses for producers.

To advance the proposal, the Open Coalition on Compliance Carbon Markets was established. Its members include Brazil, China, the European Union, the United Kingdom, Canada, Chile, Germany, Mexico, Armenia, Zambia, France, and Rwanda, and it remains open to new participants. By 15 November 18 countries had joined.

=== Gender Action Plan ===
UN Women called for the adoption of a strengthened Gender Action Plan, emphasizing that women and girls are disproportionately affected by climate change while also serving as key actors in climate adaptation, resilience, and community leadership. The agency urged governments participating in COP30 to ensure that gender equality is integrated across climate decision-making, finance mechanisms, and implementation policies, highlighting women's leadership as essential for effective and inclusive climate action.

=== Global Initiative on Information Integrity on Climate Change ===
Climate misinformation and information integrity were included on the COP agenda for the first time. At the opening of the conference, President Luiz Inácio Lula de Silva called for action against climate change “deniers,” stating that “we live in a time when obscurantists reject scientific evidence and attack institutions. It is time to deal another defeat to denial,” and describing COP30 as the “COP of truth” in an era of “fake news and misinformation.”

The Global Initiative for Climate Change Information Integrity presented the Declaration on Climate Change Information Integrity at the conference. Countries signing the declaration committed to addressing false and misleading information related to climate change. The declaration was initially signed by 12 nations: Belgium, Brazil, Canada, Chile, Denmark, Finland, France, Germany, Netherlands, Spain, Sweden, and Uruguay.

=== COP31 ===
Australia and Turkey both submitted bids to host COP 31. Under a compromise deal, Australia agreed that Turkey will host next year's UN climate summit while Australia will lead the conference's negotiations among governments.

== Final outcome ==
COP30 concluded with a compromise deal after running into overtime. No explicit commitment to phase out fossil fuels made it into the official text, despite strong pressure from over 80 countries (Colombia, Kenya, etc.). Instead, the agreement focused on:

- Tripling climate adaptation finance by 2035 (though without clear details on who pays).
- Launching a Just Transition Mechanism to support fairness in moving to a green economy.
- Adoption of 59 global indicators for tracking adaptation progress.

=== Fossil fuel roadmap controversy ===
A "roadmap" for phasing out coal, oil, and gas was the most contentious issue. Oil-producing nations (Saudi Arabia, UAE, others) blocked any binding language. COP30 President André Corrêa do Lago announced two voluntary roadmaps outside the formal UN process:

- One for a "just, orderly and equitable" fossil fuel transition.
- One for halting and reversing deforestation.

These will be presented at a special summit in Colombia in April 2026.

=== Climate finance ===
The deal calls for efforts to mobilize $1.3 trillion annually for developing countries (the “Baku-to-Belém Roadmap”), but details remain vague. The Loss and Damage Fund remains underfunded, sparking criticism. Green Climate Fund replenishment is weak, raising concerns about credibility.

=== Carbon compliance markets ===
Brazil launched the Open Coalition on Compliance Carbon Markets alongside China, the EU and several other markets.

=== Other key points ===
- Global Goal on Adaptation: 59 indicators adopted, with a two-year work program to refine them.
- Gender Action Plan updated.
- Trade and climate: Dialogue on trade-related climate measures agreed.
- Next COP: Turkey will host COP31, with Australia presiding.

=== Mood and reactions ===
Many observers have called the outcome "weak" and disappointing, given the urgency of the climate crisis. Civil society and vulnerable nations criticized the lack of ambition and binding commitments. EU and several countries expressed frustration but accepted the deal to avoid collapse.

== Incidents ==
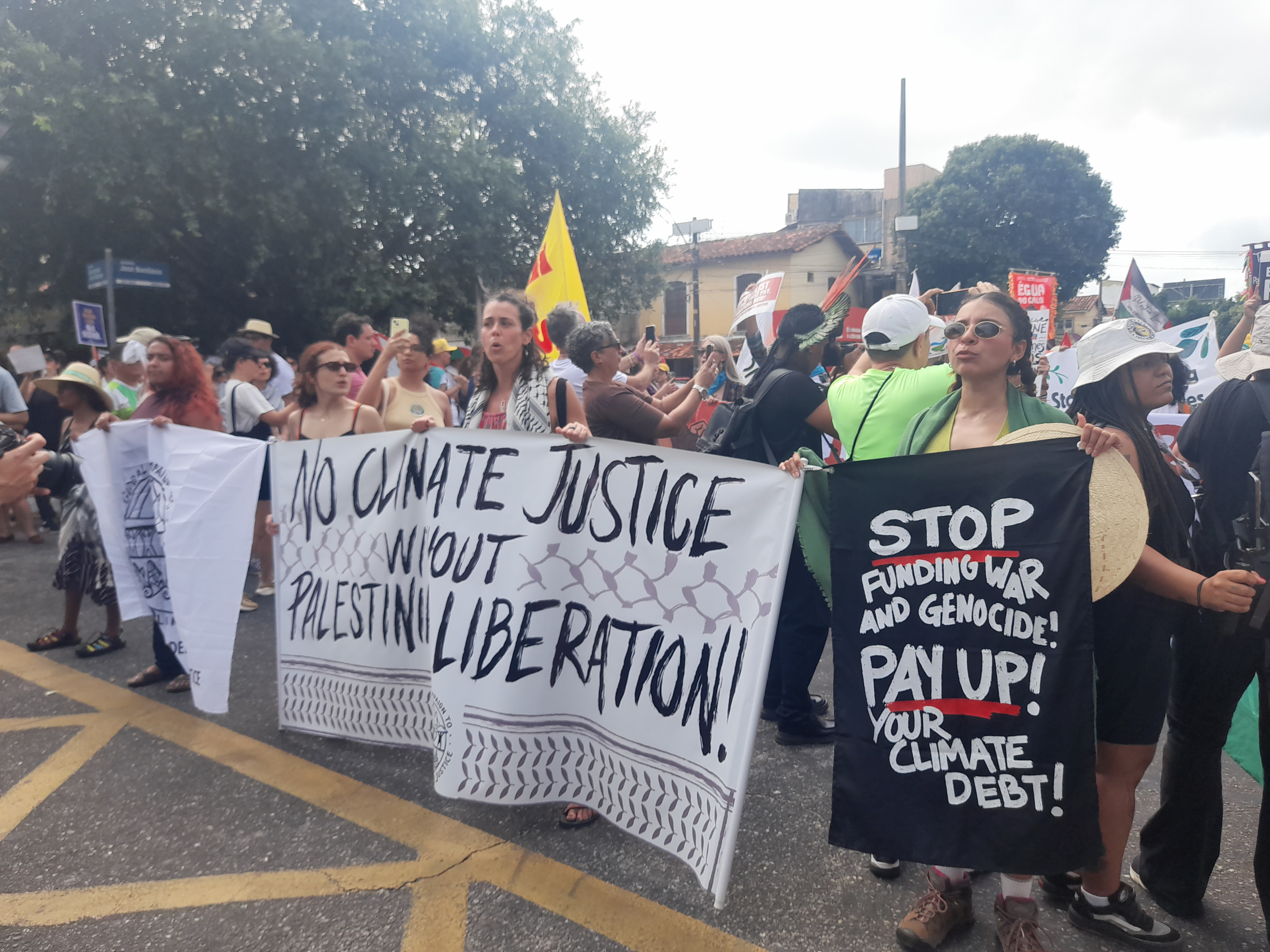
Protest in Belém on 15 November 2025

=== Protest ===
On 11 November, a group of protesters forced their way into the summit venue and clashed with security guards. Among the demonstrators were several Indigenous participants, including a leader from the Tupinambá community. The UN said two security personnel were injured during the confrontation, and authorities reported confiscating multiple batons from protesters. A 'Barqueata' with local precarious boats were made.

=== Fire ===
On 20 November 2025, a fire broke out. Organisers said there were no injuries, and Pará governor Helder Barbalho said the fire may have been related to the electrical system serving display booths in the conference pavilion. The conference center was evacuated and the conference was paused.

== Cultural responses ==
Spanish conceptual artist Josep Piñol Curto created the project Evitada (“Avoided”) in response to COP30. Initially proposed as a monumental sculpture for the host city of Belém, the work was ultimately not constructed. Piñol reinterpreted the cancellation as a conceptual critique of greenwashing and carbon-offset practices, issuing symbolic carbon credits representing the 57,765 tonnes of CO₂ emissions that were “avoided” by not producing the sculpture.

Local groups from Pará, such as Cordão da Bicharada, a traditional carnival group from the state, participated in the conference, as well as renowned artists from the Brazilian scene such as Ney Matogrosso, Fafá de Belém, Lenine, Gilberto Gil, Anitta, Gaby Amarantos, Seu Jorge and British artist Chris Martin.

== Opinion ==
After returning from Belém, German Chancellor Friedrich Merz drew controversy when he compared Germany and Brazil during a trade conference in Berlin. Merz remarked that Germans lived in “one of the most beautiful countries in the world” and stated that he and the journalists who accompanied him on the return flight were “delighted to be back in Germany and to have left that place.” His comments were widely criticized by Brazilian officials. President Luiz Inácio Lula da Silva, Pará Governor Helder Barbalho, and Belém Mayor Igor Normando all condemned Merz's characterization of the host city.

Amid the backlash, Germany's Federal Minister for the Environment, Carsten Schneider, sought to ease tensions, describing Brazil as “a wonderful country” and expressing regret that he had not stayed longer after the conference. Shortly afterward, the German government announced a commitment of €1 billion to the Tropical Forest Forever Facility, a Brazilian proposal introduced during COP30. Merz later stated that he would not apologize for his remarks.

== See also ==
- Earth Summit
