= Paul Joskow =

American economist and professor (born 1947)

Paul L. Joskow
- Born: June 30, 1947 (age 79); Brooklyn, New York City, U.S.

Academic background
- Education: Cornell University; Yale University
- Doctoral advisor: John Joseph; Herbert McGowan; Alvin K. Klevorick; Richard R. Nelson
- Influences: Ronald Coase; Oliver E. Williamson

Academic work
- Discipline: Microeconomics; Political economics Environmental economics
- Institutions: Alfred P. Sloan Foundation
- Doctoral students: Nancy Rose; Judith Chevalier; Catherine Wolfram
- Website: Information at IDEAS / RePEc

Paul L. Joskow is an American economist and professor emeritus of economics at the Massachusetts Institute of Technology (MIT). His research focuses on industrial organization, energy and environmental economics, competition policy, and government regulation. He has studied the regulation and restructuring of electricity markets, utility pricing, privatization, environmental markets, and the economic effects of regulatory policies. He was president of the Alfred P. Sloan Foundation from 2008 to 2017 and has held several senior positions at MIT, including head of the Department of Economics and director of the MIT Center for Energy and Environmental Policy Research.

== Early life and education ==
Joskow was born in Brooklyn, N.Y. in 1947 and grew up in Queens, N.Y. He attended P.S. 173, J.H.S 216 and Francis Lewis High School. Joskow received a B.A. from Cornell University in 1968 and an M.Phil. and Ph.D. in economics from Yale University in 1971 and 1972, respectively. His doctoral dissertation, A Behavioral Theory of Public Utility Regulation, examined the economic theory of regulation of public utilities.

== Academic career ==
Joskow joined the MIT faculty in 1972 as an assistant professor of economics and was promoted to professor with tenure in 1978. He subsequently held a joint appointment with the MIT Sloan School of Management and was appointed the Elizabeth and James Killian Professor of Economics in 1996.

He served as head of the MIT Department of Economics from 1994 to 1998. During his tenure, he was involved in research and teaching in industrial organization, regulation, competition policy, and energy economics. From 1999 to 2007, he directed the MIT Center for Energy and Environmental Policy Research (CEEPR), where his research focused particularly on electricity-sector restructuring, privatization, regulatory reform, and market-based approaches to environmental policy.

In 2008, Joskow left MIT to become president and chief executive officer of the Alfred P. Sloan Foundation in New York City. He held the position through 2017 and returned to MIT in 2018 as president emeritus of the foundation. His work at the foundation included programs supporting research in science, technology, economics, and issues concerning the quality of American life.

== Research ==
Joskow's early research examined industrial organization and government regulation affecting a number of industries, including the energy sector, insurance, hospitals. His work concentrated on energy markets and the electricity industry, including utility regulation, pricing, long-term contracts, vertical relationships, market structure, deregulation, and competition.

His research on electricity-sector restructuring examined the transition from vertically integrated regulated utilities toward competitive wholesale and retail electricity markets. He also studied the design of electricity markets and the economic consequences of different approaches to the organization, regulation, and economic attributes of transmission, generation, and retail pricing. His later work has continued to address electricity-market regulation, transmission planning, network tariffs, electrification, and decarbonization.

Joskow also conducted research on environmental markets and the use of economic incentives to control pollution. With Richard Schmalensee and other collaborators, he studied the United States sulfur dioxide emissions-trading program established under the 1990 amendments to the Clean Air Act. Their research was published in Markets for Clean Air: The U.S. Acid Rain Program (2000), which examined the operation and economic performance of the emissions-trading system.

His broader work in industrial organization has examined regulation, antitrust policy, privatization, market design, and the relationship between firms and regulatory institutions. His research has also addressed regulation in industries including electricity, telecommunications, and health care.

In the 2020s, Joskow continued to publish on electricity-market regulation and decarbonization. His recent work has examined electricity distribution tariffs under increased electrification, high-voltage transmission access and planning, and the economic implications of changes in electricity systems. He has also contributed to research on the interaction between artificial intelligence and power systems.

=== Books ===
Joskow has authored or edited several books and monographs. His early books include Electric Power in the United States: Models and Policy Analysis (1979), written with Martin Baughman and Dilip Kamat; Controlling Hospital Costs: The Role of Government Regulation (1981); and Markets for Power: An Analysis of Electric Utility Deregulation (1983), co-authored with Richard Schmalensee.

He later edited Economic Regulation (2000) and Empirical Industrial Organization (2004), and co-authored Markets for Clean Air: The U.S. Acid Rain Program (2000). He was also a co-editor, with Jean-Michel Glachant and Michael Pollitt, of Handbook on Electricity Markets (2021).

== Professional and public service ==
Joskow has held leadership positions in professional organizations, including the International Society for New Institutional Economics, where he served as vice president and president. He has been a research associate of the National Bureau of Economic Research and has served on the boards of academic institutions, nonprofit organizations, and corporations. He has served on the boards of the New England Electric System, National Grid, TC Energy, Exelon, and the Whitehead Institute for Biomedical Research, among other organizations. He has also served as a trustee of Yale University and as an adviser to research centers concerned with energy policy and economic research.

== Selected publications ==
- Joskow, Paul L. (1974). "Inflation and Environmental Concern: Structural Change in the Process of Public Utility Price Regulation". The Journal of Law and Economics. 17 (2): 291–327. doi:10.1086/466794. hdl:1721.1/63707. ISSN 0022-2186.
- Baughman, Martin; Joskow, Paul (1975). "The Effects of Fuel Prices on Residential Appliance Choice in the United States". Land Economics. 51 (1): 41. doi:10.2307/3145139. ISSN 0023-7639.
- Bays, Carson W.; Joskow, Paul L. (1982). "Controlling Hospital Costs: The Role of Government Regulation". Southern Economic Journal. 49 (2): 568. doi:10.2307/1058509. ISSN 0038-4038.
- Weiner, Robert; Joskow, Paul L.; Schmalensee, Richard (1985). "Markets for Power: An Analysis of Electric Utility Deregulation". Journal of Policy Analysis and Management. 4 (2): 283. doi:10.2307/3324641. ISSN 0276-8739.
- Joskow, Paul L. (1987). "Contract Duration and Relationship-Specific Investments: Empirical Evidence from Coal Markets". The American Economic Review. 77 (1). American Economic Association: 168–185. ISSN 0002-8282.
- Ellerman, A. Denny; Joskow, Paul L.; Schmalensee, Richard; Montero, Juan-Pablo; Bailey, Elizabeth M. (2000-06-19). Markets for Clean Air. Cambridge University Press. ISBN 978-0-521-66083-9.
- Joskow, Paul L., ed. (2000). Economic regulation. Critical ideas in economics. Cheltenhan, UK ; Northampton, MA, USA: Edward Elgar. ISBN 978-1-85898-947-1.
- Joskow, Paul L.; Tirole, Jean (2000). "Transmission Rights and Market Power on Electric Power Networks". The RAND Journal of Economics. 31 (3). [RAND Corporation, Wiley]: 450–487. doi:10.2307/2600996. hdl:1721.1/44966. ISSN 0741-6261.
- Joskow, Paul L.; Waterson, Michael, eds. (2004). Empirical industrial organization. The international library of critical writings in economics. Cheltenham: Elgar. ISBN 978-1-84376-314-7.
- Joskow, Paul; Tirole, Jean (2007). "Reliability and competitive electricity markets". RAND Journal of Economics. 38 (1). RAND Corporation: 60–84.
- Joskow, Paul L. (2011). "Comparing the Costs of Intermittent and Dispatchable Electricity Generating Technologies". American Economic Review. 101 (3): 238–241. doi:10.1257/aer.101.3.238. hdl:1814/18239. ISSN 0002-8282.
- Glachant, Jean-Michel; Joskow, Paul L.; Pollitt, Michael G., eds. (2021-11-12). Handbook on Electricity Markets. Edward Elgar Publishing. ISBN 978-1-78897-995-5.
- Glachant, Jean-Michel; Joskow, Paul L.; Pollitt, Michael G., eds. (2025). Handbook on electricity regulation. Cheltenham, UK ; Northampton, MA: Edward Elgar Publishing. ISBN 978-1-0353-1434-8. OCLC 1479525619.

== Honors, Awards, and Fellowships ==
- Paul Lewis Joskow graduated Cornell University Pi Beta Kappa (1968).
- Joskow is a Woodrow Wilson fellow at the Woodrow Wilson Institute of International Relations, Princeton University.
- Following a fellowship at National Science Foundation (1969–1972), Joskow joined the Center for Advanced Study in the Behavioral Sciences (1985–1986)
- Joskow joined the American Academy of Arts and Sciences as a fellow (1991), before receiving the following awards:
  - Distinguished Service Award, Public Utility Research Center, University of Florida (1993), International Association for Energy Economics, Best Paper Award (1993), and Edward A. Hewett Prize (with Richard Schmalensee and Natasha Tsukanova).
- Later in his career, Joskow received the Yale Medal (November 2005) and Gordon Y. Billard Award (MIT - 2006).
- Joskow received the Distinguished Fellow Award, American Economic Association (2013)

== Other involvements ==
Joskow is a Fellow of the Yale Corporation, the governing body of Yale University; a member of the Board of Overseers of the Boston Symphony Orchestra; a director of Exelon Corporation and a trustee of the Putnam Mutual Funds. He previously served as a director of the Whitehead Institute of Biomedical Research, the New England Electric System, State Farm Indemnity Company, TransCanada Corporation, and National Grid plc. Joskow is also a Distinguished Fellow of the American Economic Association, a Fellow of the Econometric Society, the Industrial Organization Society, and the American Academy of Arts and Sciences. He is a member of the Council on Foreign Relations and serves on the Secretary of Energy Advisory Board (SEAB). Additionally, Joskow continues to provide his expertise on the U.S. EPA's Acid Rain Advisory Committee and on the Environmental Economics Committee of the EPA's Science Advisory Board.
