= Open Coalition on Compliance Carbon Markets =

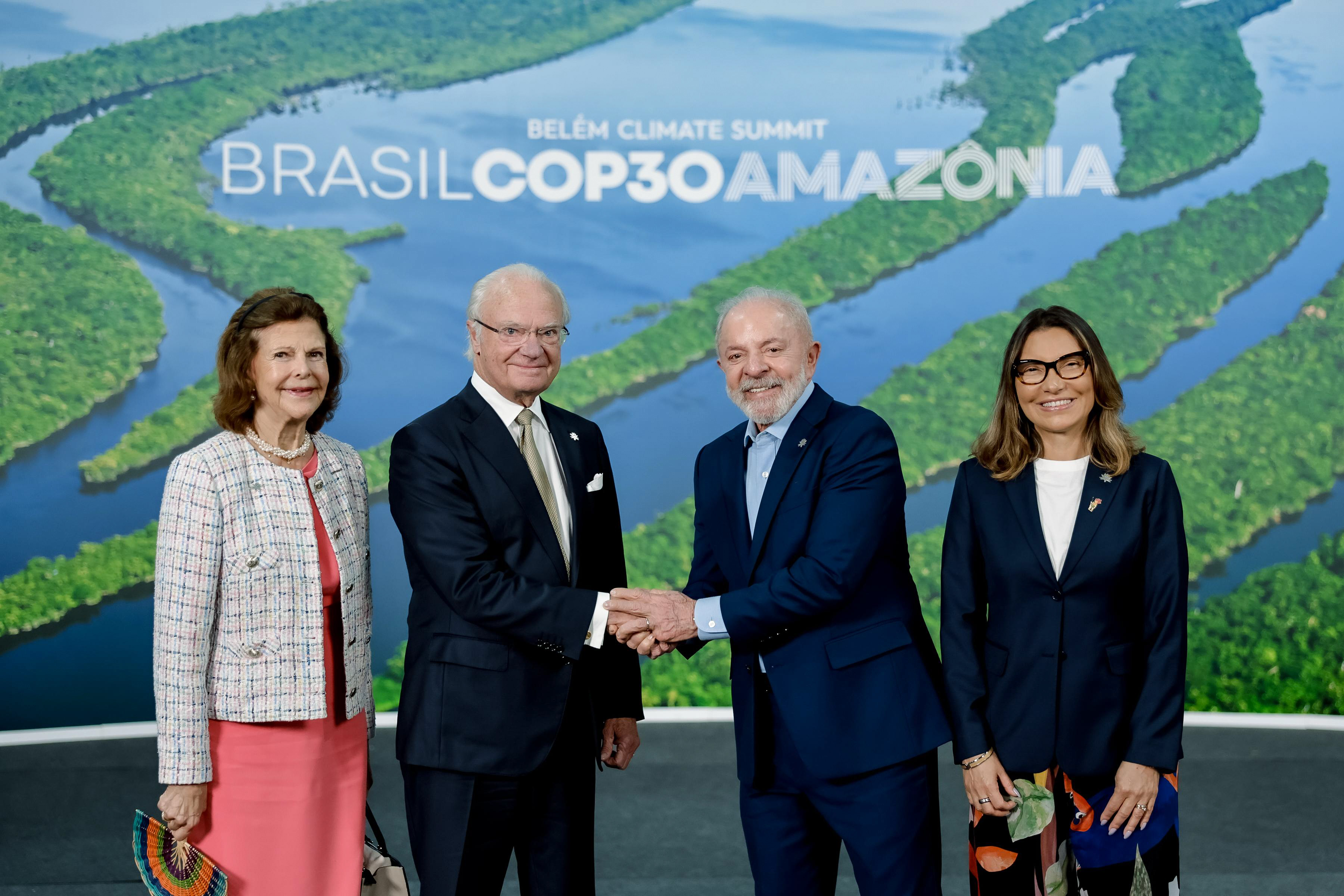
President of Brazil Luiz Inácio Lula da Silva with Silvia and Carl XVI Gustaf of Sweden at COP 30

The Open Coalition on Compliance Carbon Markets is an international collaborative initiative launched to foster technical alignment, equivalence, and interoperability among national compliance carbon markets. Proposed by Brazil during the United Nations Climate Conference 2025 (COP30) in Belém, the coalition aims to facilitate international trade, reduce transaction costs, and enhance climate ambition in alignment with the Paris Agreement, while preventing trade barriers and carbon protectionism.

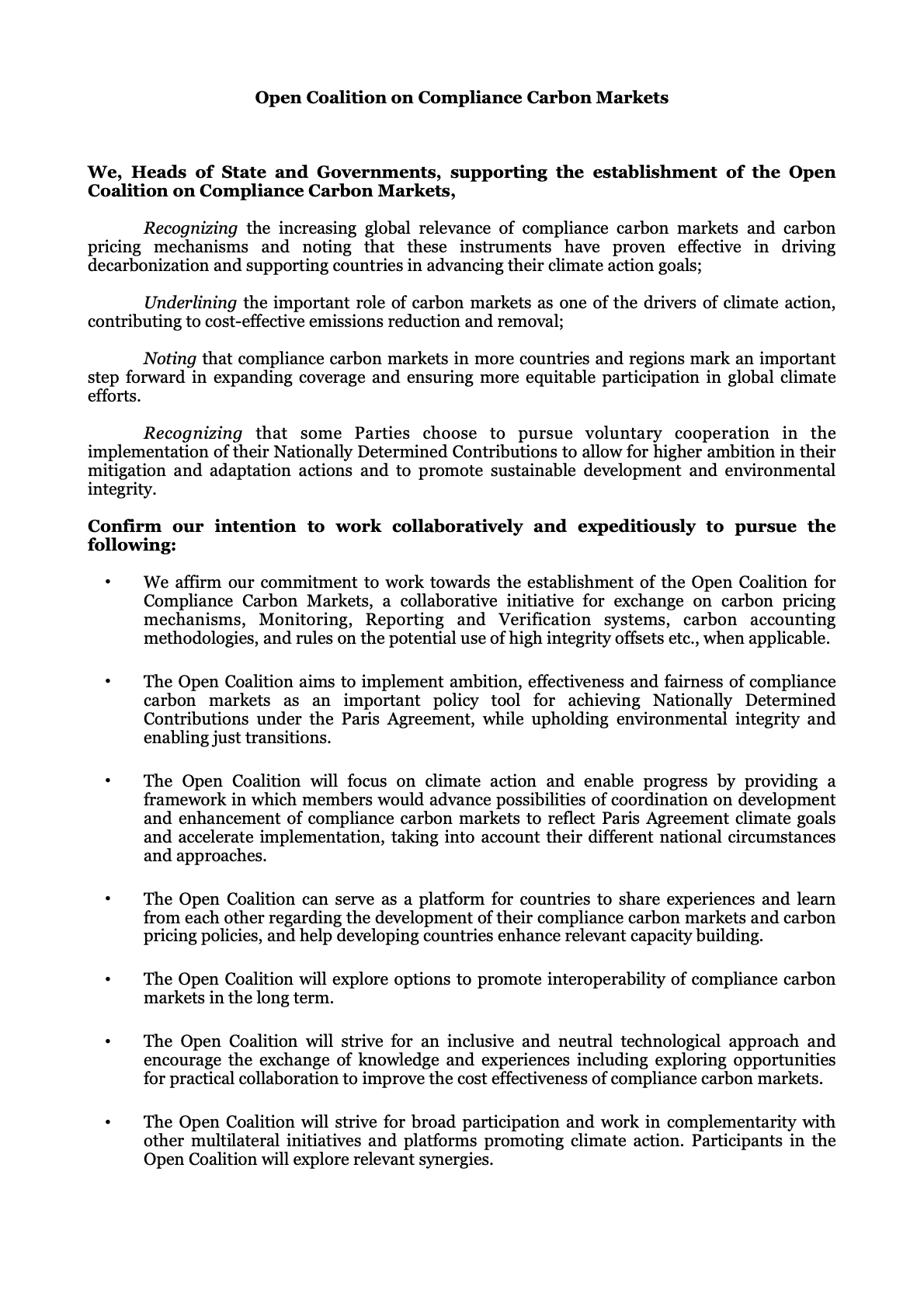
Declaration supporting the establishment of the Open Coalition on Compliance Carbon Markets.

Formally constituted in Florence in May 2026 under a signed Terms of Reference (ToR), the coalition is structured under a tripartite leadership with Brazil serving as President for the inaugural two-year term, alongside China and the European Union as Co-Chairs. The initiative focuses on technical coordination in Monitoring, Reporting, and Verification (MRV), common carbon accounting standards, and market integrity, providing a collaborative framework without relying on unilateral trade sanctions.

== Background ==
The Open Coalition emerged from discussions on aligning carbon pricing, trade, and development. Early conceptual models explored the feasibility of compliance carbon market integration and climate clubs without relying on unilateral trade sanctions.

Unlike traditional climate club models proposing uniform carbon prices and border adjustments, the initiative focuses on voluntary coordination, technical capacity building, and interoperability between existing compliance systems.

Academic research supported early discussions by analyzing alignment strategies for pricing mechanisms and common accounting standards.

== Implementation ==
=== Florence Constitutive Meeting ===
On 7 May 2026, the European Union, Brazil, and China formally constituted the Open Coalition on Compliance Carbon Markets (OCCCM) during a meeting in Florence, Italy. Representatives from founder and participating countries signed the Terms of Reference (ToR), establishing the OCCCM's objectives, scope, decision-making framework, and governance structure.

During the constitutive meeting, Extraordinary Secretary for Carbon Markets at Brazil's Ministry of Finance, Cristina Reis, stated that the establishment of the OCCCM is an initiative reflecting the shared willingness of both developing and developed countries to strengthen cooperation on carbon pricing. Vice Minister of Ecology and Environment of China, Li Gao, affirmed that China is ready to work with all parties to develop the OCCCM into an open, inclusive, pragmatic, and efficient platform for international cooperation on carbon markets.

Under the agreed framework, Brazil serves as President for the initial two-year term, with China and the European Union serving as Co-Chairs.

=== Governance and Membership ===
The coalition's governance structure, as defined in the official Terms of Reference (ToR), distinguishes between full members and observers:

- Leadership: Brazil (President), China (Co-Chair), and the European Union (Co-Chair).
- Members: Canada, France, Germany, New Zealand, Norway, Turkey, and the United Kingdom.
- Observers: Monaco, alongside international and non-governmental organizations including the Environmental Defense Fund (EDF), European Climate Foundation, Global Carbon Market Growth Coalition, Green Climate Fund (GCF), International Carbon Action Partnership (ICAP), International Emissions Trading Association (IETA), Climate Club, United Nations Development Programme (UNDP), United Nations Environment Programme (UNEP), World Resources Institute (WRI), and the European University Institute.

=== Institutional Roadmap ===
The implementation roadmap focuses on practical technical cooperation, including sharing best practices in Monitoring, Reporting, and Verification (MRV), establishing common carbon accounting standards, and fostering system interoperability.

Next steps include establishing the Secretariat and developing a work plan for adoption at the Carbon Market Conference on 15 September 2026 in Wuhan, China.
