= Tropical Forest Forever Facility =

Forest conservation sovereign investment institution

Tropical and sub-tropical moist broadleaf forests, the biome to be conserved through the TFFF

The Tropical Forest Forever Facility (TFFF) is a proposed blended-finance mechanism to prevent the deforestation and degradation of moist broadleaf forests. The goal is to turn forests into protected assets and provide forested countries with a financial incentive to protect them.

The fund would use profits from capital market investments to provide results-based payments to rainforest countries. The mechanism was proposed by the Brazilian government. It was launched on 6 November 2025, at the COP30 Leaders' Summit in Belém, Brazil, with US$5.5 billion in funds confirmed.

== History ==
A version of this fund concept was originally proposed by World Bank treasurer Kenneth Lay in the 2000s. The mechanism, then called the Tropical Forest Finance Facility received broader attention through an article Lay co-wrote for The Center for Global Development. The current iteration was announced at COP28 in Dubai, UAE in 2023 by Brazil’s Environment Minister Marina Silva and Finance Minister Fernando Haddad.

Presidential elections were held in Brazil in September 2026. In office, TFFF initiator Luiz Inácio Lula da Silva ran against the camp around Jair and Flávio Bolsonaro. Flavio Bolsonaro, much like his father Jair Bolsonaro, under whose presidency (2019–2022) deforestation increased massively and the existing TFFF was blocked, Flávio takes climate-denying positions and prioritized the expansion of the agricultural industry, mining and infrastructure in protected forest areas. Lula narrowly won the runoff elections.

== Government endorsements ==
The governments of France, Germany, Colombia, the UAE, Malaysia, Singapore and Norway have endorsed the facility or expressed interest in investing. Germany and Norway are amongst the largest donors for tropical forest conservation, along with the UK. The UK declined to fund the Tropical Forests Forever Facility at the COP30 summit.

During a visit to Brazil in December 2024, then U.S. President Biden endorsed the TFFF.

On 6 November 2025 at the COP30 Leader's Summit in Belém, Brazil, President Luiz Inácio Lula da Silva hosted leaders from thirty countries at an event to launch the Tropical Forest Forever Facility with US$5.5 billion funds committed. Norway confirmed US$3 billion, Brazil, Indonesia and Portugal (US$1 billion each), France (up to Euro 500 million) and the Netherlands (US$5 million for the secretariat).

In October 2026, the Netherlands pledged to invest 500 million US$ in the fund over the next decade. Coincidentally, the announcement came a day after TFFF’s initiator Lula was reelected in Brazil.

== Technical advisors ==
The World Bank, the U.N. Development Programme, the Organization for Economic Cooperation and Development, as well as the Wildlife Conservation Society, Conservation International, and Campaign for Nature are technical advisors to the TFFF.

== Proposed structure ==
The program would consist of two primary institutions, the TFFF and the Tropical Forest Investment Facility (TFIF).

The TFIF is to be a $125 billion fund, constituted through a mix of public and private investments hosted at a Multilateral Development Bank, possibly the World Bank. These funds are to be invested in predominantly global south sovereign bonds. The profits from the fund, after interest payments to the investors, would be dispersed to the TFFF.

The TFFF uses the funds to reward countries for protecting those forests.

To be eligible to receive funds, a country must:

- Have tropical moist broadleaf forests
- A deforestation rate below 0.5%
- Not be a high-income country (as classified by UNCTAD)

=== Proposed disbursements ===
Rainforest countries would receive US$4 for every hectare of intact forest as budget contributions. For each hectare deforested that year, a deduction of US$400 is made from that sum. For each hectare degraded, US$100 are deducted. If deductions exceed the payout, countries are not required to pay a penalty. Previously deforested or degraded ecosystems that are fully restored become eligible for payouts again.

20% of total disbursements are to be passed along by the receiving countries to their "indigenous peoples and local communities".
