= Avenida Liberdade =

Highway in Pará, Brazil created for COP30

Route information
- Length: 13.2 km (8.2 mi)
- Existed: 2025–present

Location
- Country: Brazil
- State: Pará

Highway system
- Highways in Brazil; Federal

The Avenida Liberdade is a four-lane highway currently being constructed in protected Amazon rainforest areas . The infrastructure project spans over thirteen kilometers through protected rainforest territory, and plans to incorporate several environmental-focused designs including wildlife crossings to allow animal movement, bicycle lanes, and solar-powered lighting systems.

The highway's construction generated significant controversy due to its ecological impact caused by its deforesting of a region critical to global carbon absorption and biodiversity preservation.

== History ==
The Avenida Liberdade highway project was initially proposed by the Pará state government in 2012, but had been repeatedly delayed due to environmental concerns. The selection of Belém as the host city for the November 2025 COP30 climate summit revived interest in the project, along with approximately thirty other infrastructure initiatives designed to modernize the city. The Brazilian federal government committed substantial resources to preparing Belém for its role as host, including more than US$81 million for expansion of the Belém/Val-de-Cans International Airport from seven million to fourteen million passengers annually.

In conjunction with the highway project Belém underwent extensive preparation for COP30 with multiple infrastructure initiatives which included redevelopment of the city's to accommodate cruise ships for visitor lodging, the construction of new hotels throughout the city, and the expansion and modernization of the city's transportation networks. In addition, government officials announced the development of a 500,000 square meter urban park called the Parque da Cidade, intended to feature green spaces, sports facilities, and restaurants.

Comparative satellite imagery from Copernicus Programme, captured in October 2023–2024, visually documented a distinct cleared corridor cutting through densely vegetated areas that were intact in the previous year's observations. Construction progress reached approximately 20% completion as of November 2024, based on updates published through official Brazilian government channels.

== Design ==
The Avenida Liberdade highway extends approximately 13.2 kilometres (8.2 mi) through previously forested areas surrounding Belém. According to Pará regional government specifications, the roadway features a four-lane design with two lanes of traffic flowing in each direction. Its primary function involves connecting two existing transportation networks while providing an additional entry and exit path for the Belém Metropolitan Region.

Adler Silveira, infrastructure secretary for the Pará state government, has characterized the Avenida Liberdade as an "important mobility intervention" for the region and a "sustainable highway". According to Silveira, the design incorporates environmental considerations including twenty-four dedicated wildlife crossings to facilitate animal movement across the roadway, bicycle lanes, and solar-powered lighting systems to reduce energy consumption. The project was planned to become the densest wildlife crossing per square kilometer space in Brazil.

== Impact ==
=== Environmental ===
The highway's construction necessitated clearing extensive sections of native Amazon rainforest, with satellite imagery confirming deforestation along the planned route. Heavy machinery was deployed to remove trees and vegetation, with logs visibly piled alongside the partially completed roadway. The project involves paving over wetland areas and bisecting a protected forest zone, creating two disconnected ecological segments.

Environmental scientists expressed concern about habitat fragmentation resulting from the highway's cutting through an Environmental Protection Area. Animal researcher and wildlife veterinarian Professor Silvia Sardinha highlighted the project's potential disruption to wildlife movement patterns and reduction in available habitat for native species. He stated that the highway would will create artificial barriers for land animals, limiting territories for living and breeding, while also reducing suitable areas for rehabilitated animals to be released back into the wild. Researchers also noted that transportation corridors through forested regions frequently create a "fishbone pattern" of secondary deforestation extending outward from the primary roadway.

Environmental impact assessments conducted by state authorities in 2023 identified numerous wildlife species potentially affected by the development. These included reptiles, birds, and mammals facing displacement and increased vehicular collision risks. The assessment specifically highlighted threats to three plant species and four bird species classified as endangered, including the white-throated toucan, black-billed toucan, black-and-gray antbird, and a species of macaw.

=== Local ===
Communities living adjacent to the highway path have reported significant disruption to their livelihoods and expressed concerns about future forced displacement from lands occupied by families for generations. The design of the highway, which includes walls on either side, does not provide access points for nearby communities, preventing local residents from travelling on the road, unlike for commercial traffic and long-distance travelers. Urban planning experts noted that the construction's development contradicted environmental preservation regulations that typically prohibit such construction within protected zones. They raised concerns regarding the construction's potential impacts on traditional communities, including the Abacatal-Quilombo located approximately one kilometer from the planned route, as well as the disruption of local water sources.

== Reception ==
Brazilian federal officials, including President Luiz Inácio Lula da Silva and Minister of the Environment and Climate Change Marina Silva, have framed COP30 as "a COP in the Amazon, not a COP about the Amazon." Lula da Silva stated that hosting the conference in the region demonstrates the government's commitment to forest protection while showcasing the forest and the Brazilian government's conservation achievements to international audiences.

On 13 March 2025, the Extraordinary Secretariat for COP30, an agency connected to the Office of the Chief of Staff of the Brazilian Presidency, directly addressed a BBC report claiming its involvement in the highway project. The agency explicitly distanced the federal administration from the Avenida Liberdade project, emphasizing that the highway's construction was not under federal government jurisdiction or oversight, and that the project was not included among the 33 official infrastructure initiatives designated for COP30 preparation. The Secretariat accused the report's framing as having misinformed audiences, and stated that the conference's projects would "leave a legacy for the city's population".

=== Public ===
Public opinion among Belém residents appeared divided regarding the infrastructure development. Some local business owners expressed optimism at the highway's likely economic benefits from increased tourism and commercial activity, despite disruptions due to construction.

==== Environmental controversy ====
Local critics highlighted the apparent contradiction in deforesting protected Amazon regions to host a climate conference dedicated to environmental protection. The highway also led to debate about whether massive international gatherings focused on climate action can justify their own environmental footprint. The Avenida Liberdade project was considered by critics to be emblematic of the ecological cost of transporting thousands of delegates across the globe and constructing extensive new infrastructure to support such events.

The use of protected forest areas for development has drawn particular scrutiny, with conservation advocates arguing that the deforestation contradicts Brazil's stated commitment to preserving the Amazon ecosystem and its critical role in global climate regulation. Local environmental professor Silvia Sardinha observed that while high-level discussions will occur among government officials and business leaders, perspectives from those living within the Amazon were "not being heard" in the planning process.

Environmental advocates raised concerns that improved access to remote forest areas may facilitate increased environmental crimes, including illegal mining and illegal logging, in the absence of robust governance structures.

CEO of Laboratório da Cidade Lucas Nassar claimed that sustainability considerations appeared secondary in many planning decisions, despite funding from major Brazilian institutions including the Ministry of Planning, Budget and Management, the Brazilian Development Bank, and Itaipu Binacional. Urban planning experts emphasized that the construction infrastructure choices would likely exacerbate Belém's climate vulnerability by reducing urban green spaces critical for temperature regulation. They also stated that the project would increase carbon dioxide emissions through expanded private vehicle usage and fuel consumption, and that it missed opportunities to implement up-to-date climate-adaptive urban design.

== See also ==
- 2025 United Nations Climate Change Conference
- Belém–Brasília Highway
- BR-010
