= Josep Piñol Curto =

Catalan visual artist

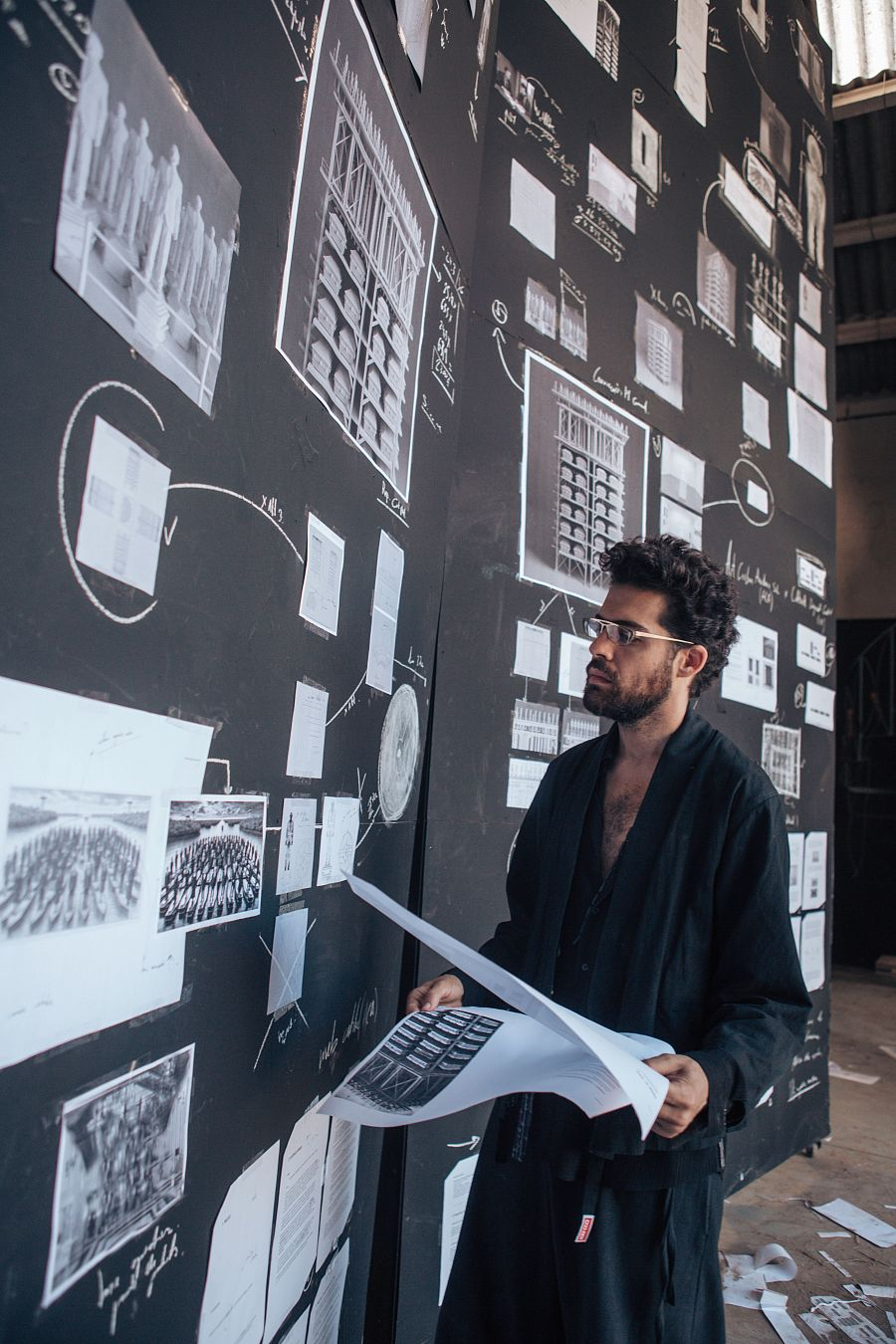
- Josep Piñol photographed by Enric Virgili
- Born: 10 May 1994 (age 31); Tivenys, Catalonia, Spain
- Occupation: Visual artist
- Known for: La Santa Baldana, Evitada, staged photography, video art

Josep Piñol Curto (born 10 May 1994) is a Catalan visual artist whose work spans staged photography, video art, and immersive installations. His practice includes the performative project La Santa Baldana (2024) and the conceptual intervention Evitada (2025), which gained international recognition for its critical approach to ecological politics and greenwashing. His work explores themes such as human suffering, ecology, ritual, and the symbolic reinterpretation of culture.

== Early life ==
Josep Piñol Curto was born on 10 May 1994 in Tivenys, a small village in the Terres de l’Ebre region of Catalonia. He grew up in a deeply traditional, religious environment infused with Catholic rituals and local customs. As a child, he served as a monaguillo (altar boy), which later informed his symbolic approach to ritual in art.

Raised in a conservative rural setting, Piñol has spoken about the tension he felt between cultural conformity and his emerging identity. During public interviews—such as the conversation cycle ‘‘CK Que Sé Jo’’—he described feeling creatively stifled in adolescence, which motivated his search for more expansive and introspective artistic forms.

== Career ==
Piñol’s early work included the photographic project Senegal S-12, inaugurated on 15 March 2014 at the Museu de Tortosa. The exhibition, previously shown at Barcelona’s Antiga Fàbrica Damm and Tarragona’s Tinglado 1, featured large-format images depicting daily life in Senegal—such as wrestling, agriculture, fishing, and youth football. It included text contributions by Oriol Gracià.

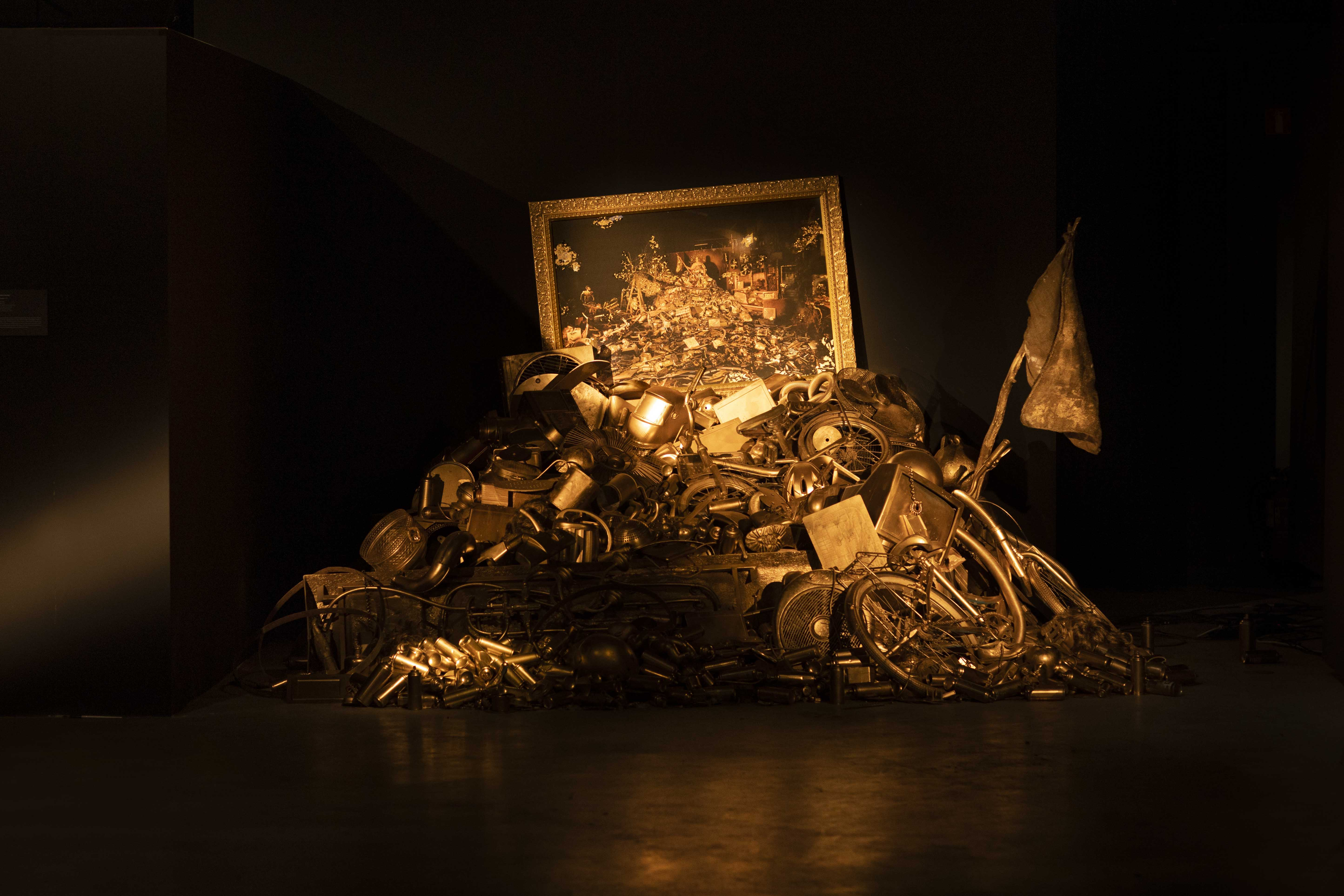
“La Muda” (2021) – Immersive photographic installation by Josep Piñol and Greta Díaz Moreau, exploring transformation, silence, and identity through theatrical scenography and symbolic imagery. Exhibited at Lo Pati – Centre d’Art Terres de l’Ebre.

In 2021, Piñol and artist Greta Díaz Moreau co-created the exhibition La Muda at Lo Pati – Centre d’Art Terres de l’Ebre. Conceived over nearly two years at La Warhol, the exhibition featured theatrical, richly detailed photo sets. It included contributions from cultural figures like Sílvia Pérez Cruz, Aida Folch, Toni Segarra, Roberto Oliván, and Itziar Castro. Critics praised its exploration of metamorphosis, silence, and transformation, leading to its schedule being extended.

=== La Santa Baldana ===
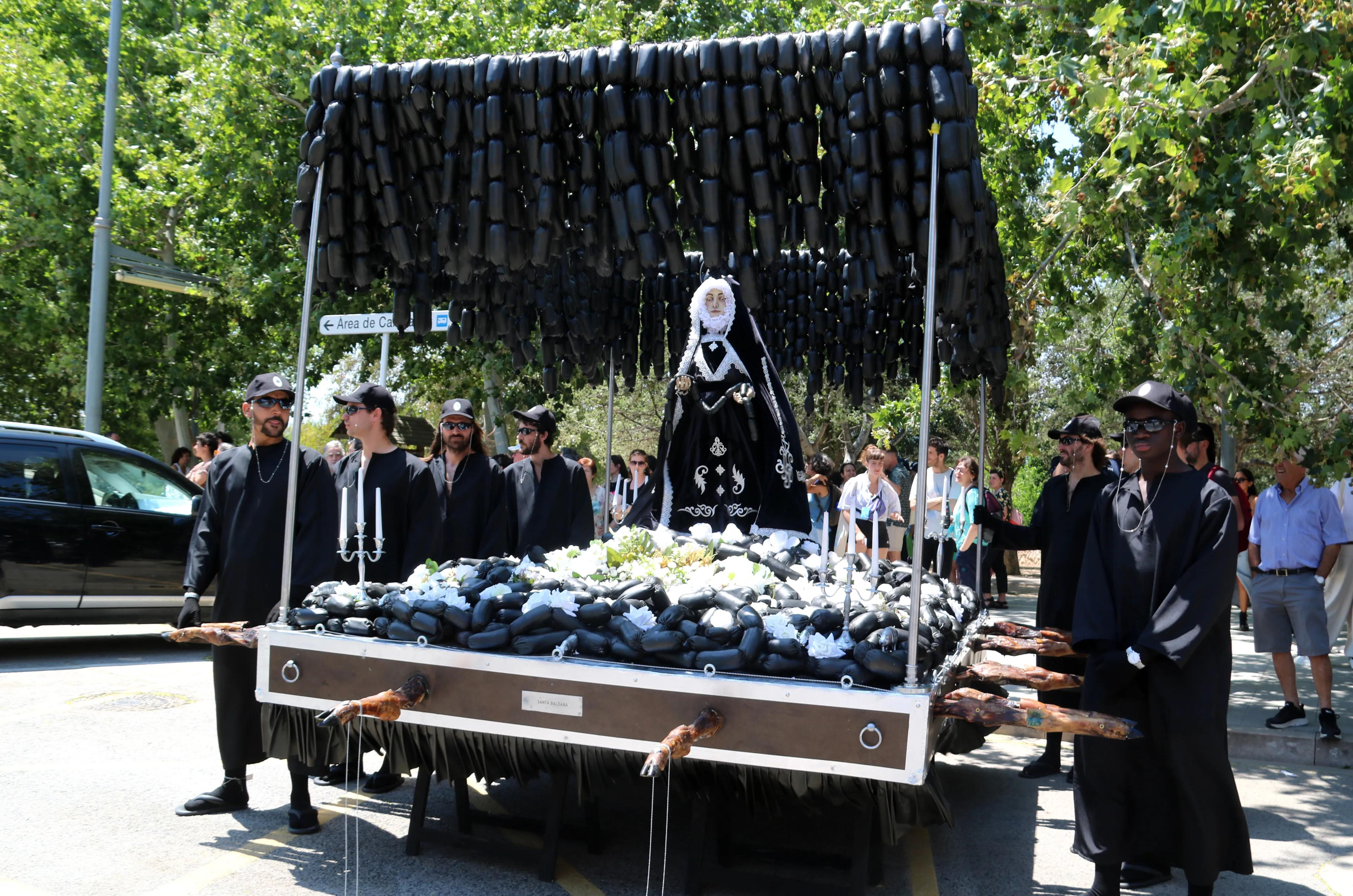
La Santa Baldana (2024) by Josep Piñol – Performance presented in Tortosa during the VII Foro de Cultura y Ruralidades, curated by the collective Konvent. The image shows the procession of the saint through the streets of Tortosa, carried by costaleros as part of a symbolic liturgy that reinterprets popular devotion and the sacred from a rural and collective perspective.

Piñol’s work La Santa Baldana (2024) is a performative intervention that drew national attention for its use of religious iconography and folkloric symbolism. The central figure is a fictional saint holding morcillas (blood sausages), prompting reflection on anthropocentrism, spiritual decay, and ecological responsibility.

Presented at the Aplec de la Santa Baldana in Tivenys, the piece sparked national media coverage and legal scrutiny, including a complaint filed by the Fundación Española de Abogados Cristianos. Piñol defended the intervention, stating that “religious imagery is not reserved for any specific group; it is an integral part of our identity and collective culture.” Following the controversy, he extended the work into a digital platform described by El Punt Avui as “refusing to give in” and “opening a virtual space for worship.”

=== Fusilamiento del 12 de octubre ===
In October 2024, Piñol unveiled Fusilamiento del 12 de octubre at the Aplec Saó art festival in Alt Pirineu. This symbolic shooting range invited viewers to fire at an artificial landscape with a slingshot, critiquing environmental destruction and colonial celebration by questioning “human supremacy, exploitation, and control over nature”. The intervention, coinciding with the National Day of Spain, served as a symbolic stand against erasure of historical resistance.

=== Evitada ===
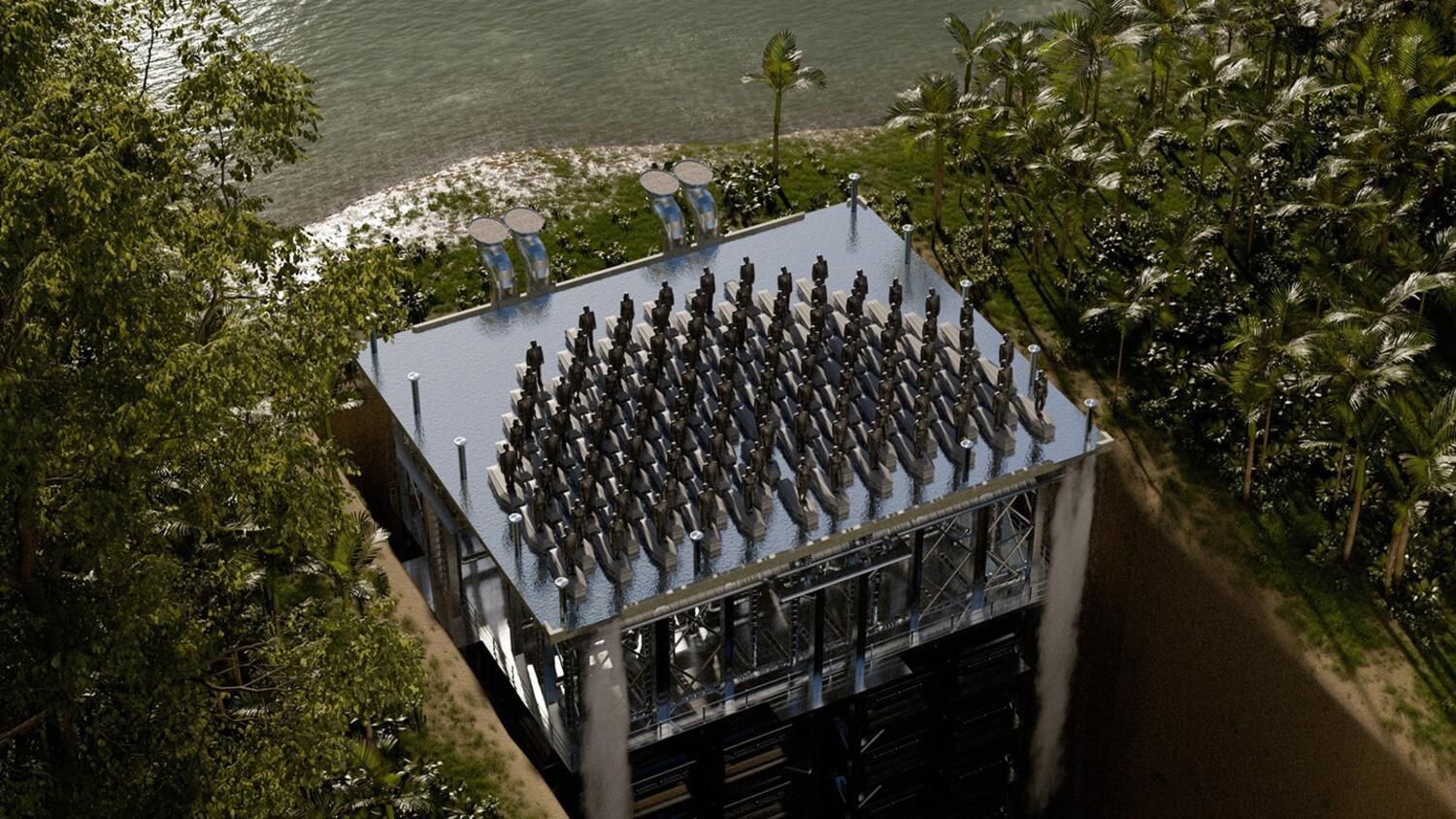
Evitada (2025) by Josep Piñol – Image of the conceptual installation originally envisioned for the Amazon city of Belém in relation to the COP30. The project, never built, became the basis for Piñol’s work on ecological ethics and the critique of carbon offset systems.

In 2025, Piñol presented Evitada (Avoided), a conceptual work developed around the planned—but ultimately unbuilt—installation intended for the Amazon city of Belém, host of the upcoming COP30 summit. The original sculpture, which would have featured one hundred bronze figures standing on metallic coffins functioning as carbon capture units, was cancelled before its construction. Piñol transformed the cancellation into the work itself, issuing a series of symbolic “artistic carbon credits” representing the 57,765 tonnes of CO₂ emissions that were “avoided” by not producing it.

Through this gesture, Evitada critiques the commodification of climate responsibility and the paradox of carbon offsetting systems, positioning non-production as a form of ecological resistance. The project was widely described as a “degrowth artwork” and “the first conceptual carbon credit in art history.”

The piece received extensive coverage in Spain and abroad, including features in La Vanguardia, RTVE, TV3, El Periódico (Barcelona), El Español, El Salto (newspaper), El Punt, and Diari de Girona. Valentina Raffio’s original coverage in El Periódico was republished by Diario de Ibiza, Faro de Vigo, Diario de Mallorca, Levante, Información.es, El Correo Gallego, and El Día (Tenerife). Internationally, the project appeared in Surface Magazine, Earth.org, The Art Newspaper, ARA English, Redd-Monitor, Ninja Impactful, and IN-SPAIN News.

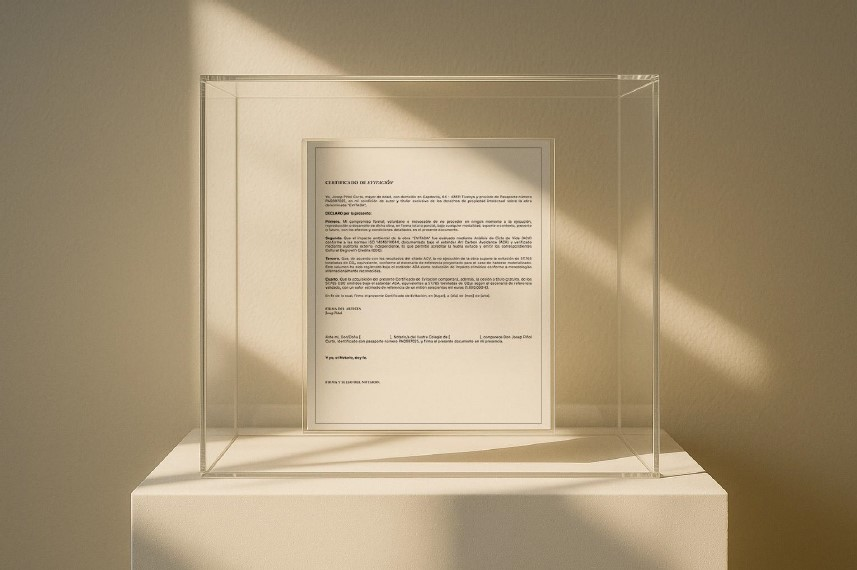
Certificate of Avoidance (2025) – Conceptual artwork by Josep Piñol, presented and auctioned at the Museu Tàpies in Barcelona as part of the Museu Habitat cycle. The piece formalizes the non-production of the project Evitada through an official certificate symbolizing avoided carbon emissions.

On 4 October 2025, Evitada was presented as an institutional exhibition titled La primera obra de arte evitada (“The first avoided artwork”) at the Museu Tàpies in Barcelona, curated by Roberta Bosco. The exhibition formed part of the museum’s Museu Habitat cycle and reflected on artistic degrowth, ecological ethics, and the limits of production in contemporary art.

Critics and scholars have interpreted the project as part of the emerging dialogue between conceptual art and ecological economics, situating Piñol within a generation of European artists who use degrowth and refusal as creative strategies.
