= Cordão da Bicharada =

Brazilian parade

- Nickname(s): Bicharada de Juaba
- Foundation: 1975
- Colors: Multicolored
- Symbol: Forest animals (macaws, jaguars, monkeys, toucans, river dolphins, tortoises, snakes, alligators, and others)
- Location: Vila de Juaba, Cametá, Pará, Brazil
- Patron: Zenóbio Gonçalves Ferreira (Master Zenóbio)

Cordão da Bicharada is a traditional cultural event and carnival parade in the village of Juaba, municipality of Cametá, in the interior of Pará, founded by Zenóbio Gonçalves Ferreira in 1975.

== History ==
In the 1970s, in the context of the Brazilian military dictatorship, faced with the deforestation of the Amazon rainforest and the threat posed by the construction of the Itaipu Hydroelectric Power Plant to local wildlife, Zenóbio Gonçalves Ferreira realized the need to create costumes and organize a carnival parade, with original carnival songs and theatrical performances paying tribute to animals, including various species of mammals, birds, and reptiles. The project was created in the village of Juaba, in the city of Cametá, located in the interior of the state of Pará, and the group had its first carnival in 1975.

This cultural event seeks to use festivities to promote ecology and the environment and to highlight the value of Brazilian fauna, flora, and culture. For making the animal costumes, mallow (malva) is used to create the fur of the animal costumes, and tree bark for dyeing, in addition to other materials such as burlap and raw canvas, which was previously used to package coffee. Nowadays, other materials such as EVA, PET bottles, and plush fabric are also used, with the aim of incorporating recyclable materials into the making of the festival costumes and decorations. In an interview with TV Liberal, Zenóbio stated that the group's main objective is “to raise awareness about nature conservation.”

For eighteen years, only adults participated in the parade in costume, but in 1993, Cordão da Bicharada began dressing children in costumes to join in the carnival celebrations. To celebrate ten years of children participating in the carnival parade, in 2003, the group filled Cametá's main sports arena with a cast of more than sixty children dressed in costumes made of stuffed animals, which, in addition to masks, imitated details of the paws, manes, and tails of forest animals.

In 2025, the group was the subject of a mini-documentary entitled Mestre Zenóbio e o Cordão da Bicharada, directed by Cao Guimarães, which was part of the exhibition ‘Brasil de susto e sonho: um panorama da obra de Rivane Neuenschwander’, which was shown at Itaú Cultural in the city of São Paulo.

After more than fifty years of artistic and cultural activity, the group was invited to participate in the 2025 United Nations Climate Change Conference (COP-30) held in Belém, capital of the state of Pará, in a presentation attended by Minister of Tourism Celso Sabino (UNIÃO). According to journalist Fabiana Moraes, from The Intercept Brasil, she criticized the way the digital journalism portal Metrópoles reported on the group's participation, stating that “the intellectually narrow-minded text is a little gem of misinformation and arrogance.” By describing the members of Cordão as “actors dressed as crawling animals,” the portal not only made factual and cultural errors (they are not actors, nor do they “crawl”) [...] self-centered journalism, incapable of looking beyond its own navel and transforming everything it does not understand into exoticism, strangeness or, in this specific case, embarrassment." The group's participation went viral on social media, drawing criticism from sectors of the Brazilian right, including Kim Kataguiri (UNIÃO) and Nikolas Ferreira (PL).
