= André Corrêa do Lago =

Brazilian diplomat

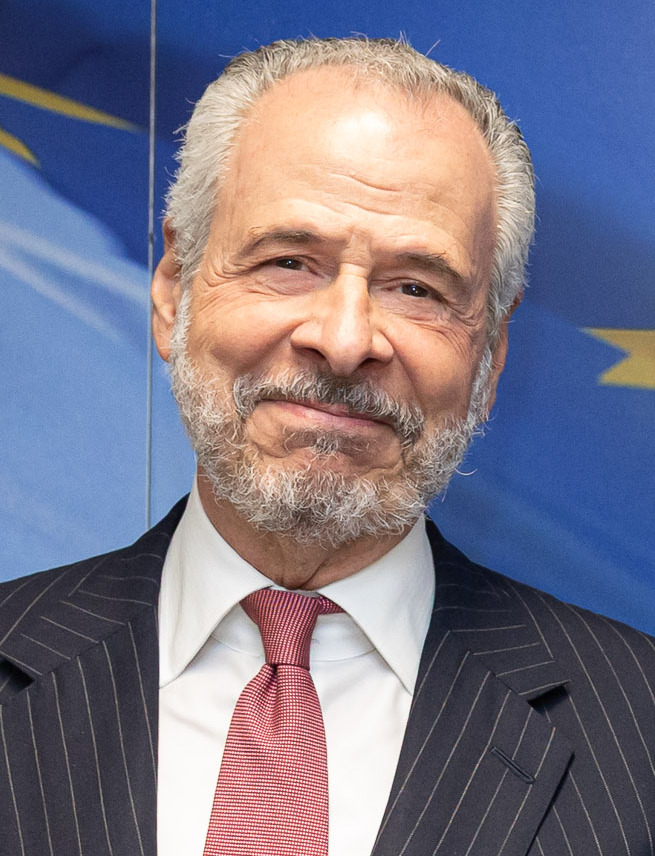
- Corrêa do Lago in 2025

President of COP30
- Incumbent
- Assumed office 10 November 2025

Secretary for Climate, Energy and Environment of Brazil
- In office March 2023 – 11 April 2025

Ambassador of Brazil to India
- In office 2018–2023

Ambassador of Brazil to Bhutan
- In office 2019–2023

Ambassador of Brazil to Japan
- In office 2013–2018

Personal details
- Born: 12 August 1959 (age 67) Paris, France
- Education: Federal University of Rio de Janeiro (Economics, 1981)

André Aranha Corrêa do Lago is a Brazilian diplomat. He joined Brazil's foreign ministry in 1982 and has worked on its sustainable development agenda since 2001. In 2023 he became a vice-minister and, in 2025, he served as the president of the United Nations Climate Change Conference, COP30, which was hosted by Brazil.

== Early life and education ==
Corrêa do Lago was born in Paris, France, on 12 August 1959. He graduated in economics from the Federal University of Rio de Janeiro in 1981. In 1982 he entered the Rio Branco Institute, Brazil's diplomatic academy, and in 1983 became a third secretary in the diplomatic service.

== Diplomatic career ==
During his early career, Corrêa do Lago held positions in Brasília dealing with international organizations, trade promotion, protocol and energy. Between 1991 and 1992, while serving in the Office of the President, he worked on preparations for the United Nations Conference on Environment and Development, commonly known as the Rio Earth Summit or Rio-92.

His overseas assignments included postings at Brazilian embassies in Madrid, Prague, Washington, D.C., and Buenos Aires, as well as at Brazil's mission to the European Union in Brussels.

From 2008 to 2011, Corrêa do Lago headed the Ministry of Foreign Affairs' Department of Energy. He subsequently directed its Department of Environment from 2011 to 2013.

He served as Brazil's ambassador to Japan from 2013 to 2018 and as ambassador to India from 2018 to 2023. From 2019 to 2023 he was concurrently accredited as ambassador to Bhutan.

In March 2023, Corrêa do Lago became Secretary for Climate, Energy and Environment at the Ministry of Foreign Affairs. He left the position at his own request with effect from 11 April 2025.

== Climate and environmental diplomacy ==
From 2011 to 2013 Corrêa do Lago served as Brazil's chief negotiator for climate change, and from 2011 to 2012 he was the country's chief negotiator for the United Nations Conference on Sustainable Development, known as Rio+20. Contemporary reporting in 2011 also identified him as Brazil's chief negotiator for the forthcoming Rio+20 conference.

During preparations for Rio+20, Corrêa do Lago served as sherpa to Brazilian environment minister Izabella Teixeira on the United Nations Secretary-General's High-level Panel on Global Sustainability. The panel's 2012 report, Resilient People, Resilient Planet, identifies Corrêa do Lago as Teixeira's sherpa.

After returning to Brasília in 2023, Corrêa do Lago again became Brazil's chief climate negotiator. He served as chief negotiator of the Brazilian delegation at COP28 in Dubai. Reuters reported in January 2025 that he had served as Brazil's climate negotiator at global climate summits since 2023, a role he had previously held from 2011 to 2013.

During Brazil's 2024 presidency of the G20, Corrêa do Lago was involved in its climate and environmental agenda. Reuters reported that he played a role in resolving an impasse between developed and developing countries during the G20 climate negotiations in Rio de Janeiro.

== COP30 presidency ==
On 21 January 2025, President Luiz Inácio Lula da Silva selected Corrêa do Lago to lead COP30, to be held in Belém, Pará. His appointment followed more than two decades of work in climate and sustainable-development diplomacy and two periods as Brazil's chief climate negotiator.

During preparations for the conference, Corrêa do Lago emphasized implementing commitments already agreed under the Paris Agreement rather than continually expanding the negotiating agenda. In March 2025, he argued that the climate process needed to move beyond negotiations and put previous agreements into practice.

The Brazilian COP30 presidency also adopted the concept of a global mutirão, drawing on the Portuguese term for a collective community effort, as an organizing idea for climate action. The concept later appeared in the title of COP30's principal political decision, Global Mutirão: Uniting humanity in a global mobilization against climate change.

Corrêa do Lago was formally elected president of COP30 when the conference opened in Belém on 10 November 2025. During the final stages of negotiations, he convened consultations among parties over the Global Mutirão decision and unresolved issues including mitigation, adaptation, finance, fossil fuels and deforestation. Consultations continued through the night into the final day of negotiations.

The final Global Mutirão decision called for efforts to at least triple adaptation finance by 2035. The parties did not reach consensus on including a reference to phasing out or transitioning away from fossil fuels, and provisions on halting and reversing deforestation were also absent from the adopted decision.

At the closing plenary meeting, Corrêa do Lago announced that the COP30 presidency would develop two separate roadmaps, one on transitioning away from fossil fuels in a just and equitable manner and another on halting and reversing deforestation by 2030. He said their results would be reported at COP31. The UNFCCC subsequently opened a formal process for contributions to both presidency roadmaps.

Corrêa do Lago's COP30 presidency continued after the Belém conference. In 2026, the UNFCCC continued to list him as president of the COP30/CMP20/CMA7 bureau. The COP30 presidency has also solicited government and stakeholder contributions to the fossil-fuel transition and deforestation roadmaps.

The COP30 presidency and the incoming COP31 presidency have worked jointly during 2026 in preparation for COP31 in Antalya, Turkey. The conference is scheduled for 9 to 20 November 2026.

== Architecture and criticism ==
Alongside his diplomatic career, Corrêa do Lago has worked as an architectural critic, author and curator. The Pritzker Architecture Prize describes him as a recognized architectural critic and documents his curatorial work.

In 2005, Corrêa do Lago and Lauro Cavalcanti co-curated Encore moderne? Architecture brésilienne: 1928–2005, an exhibition on Brazilian architecture presented at the Palais de la Porte Dorée in Paris, then home to the Institut français d'architecture. The two also co-authored Ainda moderno? Arquitetura brasileira contemporânea, published in 2005.

In 2013, Corrêa do Lago curated Arquitetura Brasileira Vista por Grandes Fotógrafos at the Instituto Tomie Ohtake in São Paulo. The exhibition brought together work by 28 photographers.

In 2014, he curated Brazil's national pavilion at the Venice Biennale of Architecture, titled Brazil: Modernity as Tradition.

In 2017, Corrêa do Lago became the first Brazilian invited to join the jury of the Pritzker Architecture Prize. He served on the jury for the 2018 prize and continues to serve as a juror. He is also a member of the International Council of the Museum of Modern Art in New York and a council member of the Oscar Niemeyer Foundation.

== Selected works ==
- Private Rio: The Great Houses and Gardens. New York: Rizzoli, 2003. Edited by Juan Pablo Queiroz and Tomás de Elia; introduction and text by Corrêa do Lago.
- Ainda moderno? Arquitetura brasileira contemporânea. With Lauro Cavalcanti. Rio de Janeiro: Nova Fronteira, 2005.
- Oscar Niemeyer: Uma arquitetura da sedução. São Paulo: BEĨ, 2007.
- Stockholm, Rio, Johannesburg: Brazil and the Three United Nations Conferences on the Environment. Brasília: Instituto Rio Branco and Fundação Alexandre de Gusmão, 2009.
