= Just Transition Mechanism =

European Union environmental policy

The Just Transition Mechanism is a policy framework developed by the European Union (EU) as part of the European Green Deal investment plan to ensure a just transition into a low-carbon economy.

The primary objective of the Just Transition Mechanism is to mitigate the worst socio-economic effects of the transition into a climate neutral economy, which can prove difficult for regions highly dependent on carbon-intensive industries. These areas usually count with lower GDP rates than the European average as well as certain degree of economic stagnation which makes them ever more vulnerable to the worst effects of the energy transition. This is particularly the case for coal mining communities, which lack employment opportunities beyond the sector.

For that purpose, the Just Transition Mechanism will help to mobilise at least €100 billion over the period 2021–2027, to be invested in regions highly dependent on carbon intensive industries – such as coal, lignite, oil shale and peat production facilities – making special emphasis in the promotion of social cohesion policies, employment generation and economic diversification.

== Background ==
The establishment of the Just Transition Mechanism coincides with the EU's growing concerns with climate change and its effects on society, the economy and the living standards of the population.

In 2016, Édouard Martin, member of the European Parliament for the Socialists and Democrats, proposed an amendment to the European Union Emission Trading System to include the concept of Just Transition. According to Mr. Martin's proposal, 2% of the ETS revenue would be employed to fund worker reskill programs in the face of the green transition. The proposal failed due to lack of support from the European Commission and the Council of the European Union.

In 2017, the commission launched the Coal Regions in Transition (CRIT) platform, designed to facilitate the energy transition of coal mining areas. In 2018, Jerzy Buzek, former Polish Prime Minister and member of the European People's Party Group at the European parliament, tabled a proposal for the creation of a "Just Energy Transition Fund". This initiative consisted of a €4.8 billion fund aimed at supporting the energy transition of coal mining areas. This proposal never materialized into law due to the commission's reluctance to impose further constraints ono the EU budget.

The Just Transition Fund was launched in 2021, as part of the Next Generation EU program. Regardless, it experienced several hurdles during its implementation. Initially, Eastern Member States proposed delaying implementation of the EU's green agenda to focus instead on the economic repercussions of the COVID-19 pandemic. Additionally, the deadlock at the Next Generation EU negotiations further complicated the fund's deployment. One of the main points of contention during the negotiation was the opposition of the Frugal Four to the issuing of so-called "corona bonds" and grants; preferring the use of loans instead.

A tentative agreement was reached in the Council on July 17, 2020. Regardless, some issues still persisted. The Frugal Four demanded to link the access to the recovery funds to the establishment of a conditionality clause regarding the promotion of rule of law, fiscal discipline, and the achievement sustainable development goals. This drove them to clash with countries such as Hungary and Poland, who proceeded to veto the post‐pandemic recovery programme and the EU Multiannual Financial Framework, hijacking in the process the approval of the necessary funds to pursue the EU's climate objectives. In the context of the Just Transition Fund, the Frugal Four pushed for the establishment of monitoring and reporting mechanisms to ensure a transparent use of these funds; questioning the readiness of Eastern and Southern European countries to comply with EU standards. This was translated into policy by linking access to the Just Transition Fund to two key conditions: Member States' adherencethe to the EU's 2050 climate objectives and the commission's approval of Territorial Just Transition Plans submitted by the Member States.

Another point of contention was the discrepancies between Western and Eastern Member States regarding the framing of the EU's climate-neutrality objectives. A group of countries including Sweden, Austria, Luxembourg, Denmark and Spain wanted to apply the climate neutrality target to each Member State individually and not just to the EU as a whole. Meanwhile, Eastern European countries favoured a less ambitious framing that would take into consideration the national circumstances of each Member State, their degree of technological development and their respective capacity to implement the Union's 2030 and 2050 climate objectives.

In January 2020, the Commission tabled its initial proposal for the Just Transition Fund, consisting of a €7.5 billion budget line. In May of the same year, the Commission tabled yet another proposal, increasing Just Transitions Fund budget from €7.5 billion to €40 billion. The initial size of the Just Transition Fund raised some doubts about its capacity to address the objectives of the just transition. However, the final sum was set to €17.5 billion in 2021, mainly due to the Frugal Four's opposition to increasing their contributions to the EU budget.

== Structure ==
The Just Transition Mechanism comprises €55 billion, to be invested over the 2021–2027 period. It is organized around three different budget lines, namely the Just Transition Fund (JTF), Invest EU and the Public Sector Loan Facility.

=== The Just Transition Fund ===
The Just Transition Fund counts €20.28 billion in grants for the period 2021–2017. This sum will be invested in the regions and territories most affected by the transition into a climate-neutral economy. For that purpose, the EU has mobilized €20.28 billion in current prices. To be precise, the Just Transition Fund comprises €9248 million from the EU's financial programme, €10872.9 million from Next Generation EU funds, and €167.7 million stemming from other countries and entities' contributions.

Access to the fund is conditional to the adoption of the European Union's 2050 climate objectives and the commission's approval of the individual Territorial Just Transition Plans drafted by the Member States through the European Semester Framework. Each Territorial Just Transition Plan will detail the national strategies for transitioning into a more sustainable economy, identifying the regions and communities most affected by the phase out of high-carbon industries. These plans include measures for economic diversification, job creation, retraining programs for workers, infrastructure development for clean energy, and other projects that will facilitate the transition to a greener economy.

=== The InvestEU Just Transition Scheme ===
Through the InvestEU Just Transition Scheme, the European Investment Bank (EIB) will provide technical support and budgetary guarantees to incentivize investment in those areas that will bear the brunt of the green transition. It is expected to mobilize €15 billion in mostly private sector investments. These funds will be directed towards the development of sustainable energy infrastructures, transport, small business and education programs; targeting the territories identified in the Territorial Just Transition Plans prepared by the Member States.

=== The Public Sector Loan Facility ===
The Public Sector Loan Facility is the third pillar of the Just Transition Mechanism. It involves a sum comprising €1.5 billion in grants, financed by the EU budget, and €10 billion in loans, from the European Investment Bank, mobilizing €18.5 billion of public investment. These funds aim to incentivize investment and economic growth in those areas most concerned by the green transition. These loans and grants are only accessible by legal entities established under the public or private law regimes of the different Member States; on the condition that their investment projects contribute to addressing the social, economic and environmental challenges deriving from the implementation of the Union's 2030 climate and energy targets.

== Criticisms ==
=== The "Equity Illusion" ===
In Sarkki et al. (2022), the study discusses the paradox of the "equity illusion" in the context of the Just Transition Mechanism. It emphasizes the importance of placing marginalized groups at the center of discussions, particularly in connection to social rights policies. The main criticism being made is that affirmative action policies, including the European Green Deal and the Just Transition Mechanism, may serve the interests of policymakers and existing industrial concerns rather than promoting societal transformation. Some critics view these initiatives as potential "greenwashing" that prioritizes industrial interests over a just transition.

A study on the TJTP process in Sweden revealed the existence of a risk of sidelining already marginalized actors in favor of industrial interests. The results of the study suggest the Just Transition Mechanism, and the Just Transition Fund in particular, may focus too heavily on compensating the industry for the losses it may incur as a result of the energy transition, potentially overlooking broader societal issues. In a study by Alexandris Polomarkakis, it was discovered that market-driven objectives often overshadow social considerations.

Another aspect of the policy that is being scrutinized by scholars is the disproportionate focus of the policy on the technical and technological aspects, at the expanse of the potential social impacts of the transition. This criticism is also in line with CEE Bankwatch Network – a network of environmental NGOs operating Central and Eastern Europe -, which argues these plans do not reflect the potential needs of the regions in question.

=== Lack of funding, allocation and eligibility criteria ===
Recent research has highlighted the lack of sufficient funding for the Just Transition Fund in order to meet the EU's 2030 and 2050 climate goals. Critics believe that the 17.5 billion euros of the Just Transition Fund and the overall 55 billion euros comprising the Just Transition Mechanism are inadequate to cover the social costs associated with the transition toward climate neutrality. The Bankwatch Network (2021) argues that the Just Transition Fund is minuscule- between 1% and 3%- to effectively support the transition of these regions. The primary beneficiaries are anticipated to be Germany, Poland, and Romania, while Estonia, Bulgaria, and the Czech Republic will experience the highest aid intensity per capita. The skeptical viewpoint presented by Theisen (2020) suggests that the Just Transition Fund may serve as a tool for the European Commission to secure political support from Eastern member states for the EU's Climate Law and 2050 carbon neutrality.

Criticisms also involve the allocation of the funds and the eligibility criteria set by the commission. The commission's approach relies on two criteria: the carbon intensity of a country's "NUTS 2" regions, which measures greenhouse gas emissions using "NUTS 2" data, as well as data related to employment and production in industrial sectors. However, concerns have been raised about the instability and high correlation of the data. The point made by scholars is that "NUTS 3" areas that are significant contributors to carbon emissions and require financial support during the energy transition may face exclusion from their otherwise intended Just Transition Fund allocations. When applying the Just Transition Fund criteria to pinpoint regions with 'high carbon intensity' at both the "NUTS 2" and "NUTS 3" levels, studies found that 40 percent of the "NUTS 3" regions identified as having high carbon intensity were not part of the "NUTS 2" regions identified with the same characteristics. The current calculation by the Commission overlooks certain highly carbon intensive "NUTS 3" regions because they fall within a "NUTS 2" region not considered highly carbon intensive. This implies that the allocation methodology may unfairly disadvantage certain countries, resulting in them receiving less funding than they require.

Another criticism made in the literature is that the major challenge in achieving a just transition to a low-carbon economy lies in the current financial support for fossil fuels. Critics argue that establishing just transition funds will inadvertently lead to the indefinite subsidizing of the fossil fuel industry. To address this issue and effectively achieve the EU's Energy & Climate 2030 and 2050 targets, experts call for a proactive policy overhaul and a re-allocation of finances to ensure a just transition to a low-carbon economy, emphasizing the need to shift away from supporting traditional energy sources and towards embracing a just transition that prioritizes renewable energy.

=== Lack of Transparency ===
The Territorial Just Transition Plans assess the territories and projects where the Just Transition Funds will be allocated, as well as constituting one of the prerequisites to access funding. A study has found that the process of drafting these plans and their approval is excessively restrictive, distant, and lacking in democratic elements to guarantee the essential engagement of social partners. This criticism is in line with the report of the CEE Bankwatch Network, which argues that in most cases the final updated version of these plans is not publicly available.

This phenomenon has been exacerbated by the lack of meaningful collaboration between actors at the EU, national and regional level. Despite the acknowledgement by the Commission of the importance of an active social dialogue and the recognition that a successful transition requires policies designed with citizen involvement, NGOs and citizens were excluded from the formulation process. Several studies on the Just Transition Mechanism have shown that one of the most undervalued criticisms is the one that concerns the capacity of subnational actors, regional and local authorities, as well as their contributing role in policy formulation.

=== Employment over redevelopment ===
Critics argue that the European Commission's approach to a just transition, with its Just Transition Mechanism (JTM), is inadequate for achieving social justice and overall well-being. (Heffernan, 2022) The narrow focus on equipping workers with green economy skills overlooks broader distributive justice concerns within climate policies, as well as wider issues related to social protection and inclusion. Scholars argue the policy focuses too much of its attention on unemployment policies rather than social protection. Critics contend that the EU's strategy for the transition does not align with the International Labour Organization (ILO) Guidelines, which stress the importance of integrating territorial/sectorial policies and social investment policies into a robust social protection system that ensures social rights for all citizens. They argue that it lacks a substantial definition of what constitutes a just transition for individuals rather than corporations. Lastly, the Bankwatch Network argues that industrial actors' interests are hidden behind the promise of employment, but frequently, these projects fall short of generating the number of jobs they assert. The NGO explains that the expense incurred in creating these jobs often surpasses that in other sectors, attributing these facts to an effort by companies to sidestep the polluter pays principle, seeking public funds to meet their environmental restoration obligations..

== Gender Perspectives in the Just Transition Mechanism ==
=== Gender Dimensions of Climate Change ===
Social disparities in Europe are varied, encompassing differences in income, gender, ethnicity, age, and various social classifications. Approximately 20% of the EU population (109 million people) experience poverty or social exclusion, with uneven distribution across regions. The 2023 Gender Equality Index focuses on the socially fair transition of the European Green Deal, emphasizing the effects of transitioning to a low-carbon society from an intersectional and gender perspective. Studies highlight the different impacts of climate change on men and women, with men contributing more to carbon emissions and women being more vulnerable to its negative effects. The establishment of the Just Transition Fund relied on an Impact Assessment conducted in 2018 that did not contain any reference to gender, despite the requirement of all Impact Assessment to have a gender-impact assessment.

Despite efforts, gender equality in Europe progresses at a slow rate, with the Gender Equality Index projecting that at the current pace, it will take almost three generations to achieve gender equality. The European Commission's Gender Equality Strategy 2020–2025 acknowledges the importance of diversity and intersectionality in its framework for attaining gender equality. In the context of the Just Transition Mechanism, understanding these broader social disparities and gender dynamics is crucial for evaluating the effectiveness and fairness of the proposed transition policies. It emphasizes the need for a comprehensive approach that addresses not only environmental concerns but also social and gender inequalities. This perspective further underscores the challenges and complexities that arise when implementing a just and fair transition in the European context

=== Lack of gender inclusive policies ===
Even though gender equality and the Just Transition are top priorities for the European Commission, the degree to which the European Green Deal and the Just Transition Mechanism foster a "just" and "socially fair" transition has been subject to scrutiny. Scholars and civil society organizations argue that the European Green Deal has paid little attention to gender, often characterizing it as "gender-blind" and arguing that the concepts of "climate justice" and "gender justice" may be constrained within its framework. Some studies are even calling for a reconceptualization of the European Green Deal, or even a "feminist European Green Deal", suggesting the need to shift its focus from being a "growth strategy" primarily concerned with expanding the economy to a genuine well-being policy centered on nurturing both people and the planet.

=== A male dominated workforce ===
A key critique of the Just Transition Mechanism and the distribution of funds is target specific industries characterized by a male dominated workforce. The World Resources Institute underscores the potential for the shift to renewable energy to create 18 million jobs globally by 2030, but this transition is anticipated to result in the loss of around 6 million jobs in high-carbon sectors. The International Renewable Energy Agency (IRENA) plays a crucial role in guiding nations toward sustainable energy sources. As per IRENA's Annual Review (2023), Europe collectively held 1.8 million jobs in the renewable energy sector, with approximately 1.6 million within the 27 member states of the European Union (EU-27). Notably, women constitute less than one-third (32%) of the renewable energy workforce.

The issue arises from the Just Transition Mechanism's sectorial and territorial focus, favoring male-dominated sectors and neglecting those where women are disproportionately represented, often characterized by low wages and job insecurity. This trend threatens to reinforce existing gender segregation and other disparities within these sectors and the broader labor market.

Advocates for a just transition to a well-being economy argue for the adoption of an ecofeminist approach to policymaking. This approach emphasizes sustainable jobs not only in terms of employment but also in contributing to overall well-being. Unfortunately, sectors with a significant representation of women, such as healthcare and services, are often disregarded in the context of the Just Transition Mechanism. However, studies indicate that the combination of climate change and environmental decline, particularly extensive pollution, will exacerbate challenges faced by healthcare systems, compounding the demands from an aging population in Europe. Additionally, education plays a vital role in achieving long-term sustainability, underscoring the importance of incorporating women in all aspects of the transition.

=== The persistence of traditional gender roles ===
The just transition also involves a deep understanding of gender roles within mining communities. Women can be disproportionately affected by the transition in mining industries. The Center for Strategic & International Studies (CSIS) highlights the importance of recognizing the far-reaching influence of the mining sector across society and the deep-rooted gender inequality of the fossil fuel industry. In their working paper argue that in mining communities, women often find it challenging to break away from established gender norms. They may encounter pressure to engage in paid work when family incomes decrease, all while managing household and caregiving responsibilities.

A publication by the Stockholm Environment Institute (SEI) assessed the distributional effects of past mine closures and declines, aiming to provide insights for ongoing and future planning related to energy transitions. It is a well-known fact that traditional gender norms are extremely strong in the coal-mining industry/mining communities, benign women primarily confined to domestic duties. The study showed that the decline and closure of mining had extensive psychological and physical health effects on women such as increased domestic violence and a double-burden for women as they needed to look for low skilled jobs to compensate for the lost family income.

=== The importance of a "just and fair transition" ===
The areas that rank the worst on gender equality coincide with those that are the focus of Just Transition Mechanism. In the first place, the primary effects of job losses connected to coal phaseout will be felt in Poland's vast coal-mining regions, Greece, Bulgaria, and Romania. According to the Gender Equality Index, Romania, Greece and Poland rank last when it comes to gender equality among EU27. This demonstrates the significance of approaching the Just Transition agenda from a gender perspective from the very beginning.

The World Resources Institute highlights that phasing out coal is crucial for reaching climate neutrality since coal is the most polluting fossil fuel. According to WRI's analysis, Greece has made the fastest reduction in coal usage among the top 10 countries globally, going from 51% in 2014 to 10% in 2022. However, despite this achievement, Greece ranks lowest on the Global Gender Gap Index in 2023, coming behind Romania, Cyprus, and Hungary. This stark contrast emphasizes the necessity of a JTM that not only addresses environmental concerns but also ensures equitable social and gender outcomes. It highlights the complex interplay between environmental policies and social dynamics, emphasizing the imperative for a holistic approach to transition strategies.

=== Gender Intersectionality and equality in policy implementation ===
Schollars argue that approaching climate change through a gendered lens involves more than directing attention solely towards women. Women constitute a diverse group, and gender disparities intersect with various structural inequalities such as class, ethnicity, nationality, health, sexual orientation, age, and geographical location. Several studies that examine climate change through a gender lens highlight the importance of seeing women as not a homogeneous group. According to an intersectional perspective, the groups most likely to be left behind are those whose marginalization and disadvantage cross over in multiple ways, strengthening one another.

=== Just Transition and Gender Mainstreaming ===
The discourse surrounding the concept of a Just Transition has brought increased attention to the notion of gender mainstreaming, a term initially introduced during the 1995 Beijing Conference. To achieve a future that is both "gender-just and climate-just", Allwood (2020) emphasizes the necessity of not only analyzing the relationship between gender equality policy and climate policy but also exploring the interplay between gender mainstreaming and climate mainstreaming. Emphasizing the importance of alignment with these objectives, a special report by the European Court of Auditors on gender mainstreaming within the EU budget has played a pivotal role in bringing attention to the commission's shortcomings in meeting its commitments. The report served as a critical assessment, revealing that the commission had not lived up to its promises.
