= Climate club =

Climate policy measure

A climate club is an international coalition of nations aimed a addressing global climate change mitigation.

A climate club is a coalition of nations where:

1. membership is voluntary and excludable, avoiding universal unanimity requirements.
2. members agree to a harmonized mitigation standard (e.g., a carbon price, emissions cap, or equitable framework) and collectively enforce sanctions against non-members (such as trade barriers or financial restrictions).
3. the incentive to join is the dual payoff of global emissions reduction (the public good) and the exclusive club benefits of membership (achieved directly by being exempt from the sanctions imposed on outsiders).

Climate clubs were pioneered by Nobel laureate William Nordhaus in 2015. A number of instances of climate club have been proposed, in addition to the Nordhaus Climate Club, the Themis Mechanism and the G7 Climate Club.

== Nordhaus Climate Club ==
The Nordhaus Climate Club is based on a common domestic coalition wide price on carbon emissions. It advocates setting prices over caps. Sanctions on non-members take the form of uniform tariffs on non-members. Exemptions are made for poor countries, based on a GDP per capita threshold.

== The Themis Mechanism ==
The Themis Mechanism is based on two carbon prices: a domestically retained minimum price on all emissions, and international transfer applied to a nations per capita excess emissions (emissions above the global average). Large per capita emitters will be net international contributors, small per capita emitters will be paid. Prices are fixed in a annual elicitation process. Non-members are sanctioned by uniform trade tariffs.

== History ==
A climate club is a coalition of the willing among countries that wish to adopt more stringent climate mitigation policies. Sometimes the term is used loosely to refer to any such international climate alliance. However, the concept of a climate club has most famously been promoted in a stricter sense by William Nordhaus, winner of the 2018 Nobel Memorial Prize in Economics. In his conceptualization, the climate club introduces carbon pricing among the club's member states and levies a fee on all imports of goods from countries that are outside the club and have not introduced similar carbon pricing. This is expected to encourage more countries to join the club and introduce carbon pricing.

A 2025 paper in Econometrica found the kind of climate club that Nordhaus advocated for, with border taxes to deter free-riding, "can achieve 33–68% of the globally optimal carbon reduction, depending on the initial coalition (EU, EU + US, or EU + US + China)."

== The G7 Climate Club ==
The G7 Climate Club is an international initiative aimed at promoting global cooperation in reducing greenhouse gas emissions and accelerating decarbonization, particularly in high-emitting industries and developing economies. Launched in 2022 by the G7, the Climate Club focuses on facilitating collaboration between countries, industries, and other stakeholders to achieve the goals outlined in the Paris Agreement and limit global temperature rise to 1.5 °C.

The G7's version of the Climate Club differs slightly, focusing on partnerships and cooperative approaches rather than punitive measures. The idea of a Climate Club originated from efforts to bridge the gap between developed and developing nations in climate action. Spearheaded by the G7, particularly under the leadership of Germany's Chancellor Olaf Scholz, the initiative was announced in December 2022 during the G7 summit. It is designed to foster international cooperation in decarbonization while avoiding protectionist trade policies and carbon leakage (the relocation of carbon-intensive industries to countries with looser regulations). Furthermore, it is invisigaged that trading partners support each other in the transformation of the industrial sector, in the production of hydrogen, ammonia, crude petrol, methanol and synthetic fuels.

=== Structure and Membership ===
The Climate Club is a voluntary coalition of countries and partners committed to advancing industrial decarbonization and strengthening climate cooperation. In 2022, the founding members were: Germany, France, Italy, Japan, Canada, United Kingdom, the United States and the European Union. The climate club is open to other countries, and an invitation to developed as well as other emerging economies and developing countries, can be sent upon request.

As of May 2025, there are 46 member states. Germany and Chile are co-chairs. The Secretariat is hosted by the Organisation for Economic Cooperation and Development, in tandem with the International Energy Agency.

Member states
Countries
Chile (co-chair)
Germany (co-chair)
Argentina
Australia
Austria
Bangladesh
Belgium
Canada
Colombia
Costa Rica
Croatia
Denmark
Egypt
European Union
Finland
France
Greece
Indonesia
Ireland
Italy
Japan
Kazakhstan
Kenya
South Korea
Luxembourg
Malaysia
Morocco
Mozambique
Netherlands
New Zealand
Norway
Peru
Poland
Singapore
Slovakia
Spain
Sweden
Switzerland
Thailand
Turkey
Ukraine
United Kingdom
United States
Uruguay
Vanuatu

Participating countries commit to enhancing climate action through domestic policies and working with international partners to meet shared decarbonization goals. The club also engages key stakeholders from private industry, non-governmental organizations (NGOs), and multilateral institutions such as the International Energy Agency (IEA) and the United Nations Framework Convention on Climate Change (UNFCCC) and United Nations Industrial Development Organization (UNIDO).

== Global Matchmaking Platform ==
The Global Matchmaking Platform was launched by the United Nations Industrial Development Organization in collaboration with the Climate Club at COP29 in Baku, Azerbaijan. As the first platform specifically focused on connecting countries with global technical and financial assistance, it provides support to enable industrial sectors to transition to low-emission and zero-emission practices. By addressing country-specific needs, the platform matches countries with a network of delivery partners, facilitating the transfer of innovative technologies, investment opportunities, and policy guidance to drive the decarbonization of energy-intensive industries like steel and cement in emerging and developing economies.

== Criticism ==
=== Concept ===
The idea of a climate club has been criticized by countries that fear the imposition of fees on their exports as well as by researchers who are skeptical of carbon pricing in general. Others have argued that some of the supposed losers, such as China and India, will actually gain from a climate club and the resulting introduction of carbon pricing.

The EU's Carbon Border Adjustment Mechanism (CBAM) has been labeled as the possible beginning of a climate club. Others see CBAM as too narrow to function as a climate club.

=== Climate Club ===
When presenting the proposal, Scholz's proposal has been criticized as vague. The journalist Petra Pinzler criticized the Climate Club as an expression of the "Janus-faced behavior" of the Scholz cabinet, because Germany is simultaneously hindering ambitious progress and, as a result of the Russian war of aggression against Ukraine, is interested in developing new gas sources worldwide. In addition, the Climate Club lacks member states (as of May 2023), which is why it is more like an 'association for the promotion of green industrial transformation'.
