= Sarah Miller =

American health economist

- Education: Tulane University (BA); University of Illinois Urbana-Champaign (PhD)
- Spouse: Andreas Hagemann
- Awards: ASHEcon Medal
- Scientific career
- Fields: Health Economics
- Workplaces: University of Michigan
- Thesis: Essays in Applied Microeconomics (2012)
- Doctoral advisor: Darren Lubotsky; Dan Bernhardt; Jeffrey Brown; Robert Kaestner

Sarah Miller is an American health economist currently serving as professor of Business Economics and Public Policy in the University of Michigan Ross School of Business. Her research examines the short and long-term effects of health insurance expansions, and the impacts of income on individuals' health and well-being. In 2022, she received the ASHEcon medal, awarded by the American Society of Health Economists to the best health economist under the age of 40.

== Biography ==
Miller received her BS in Economics from Tulane University in 2006, and her PhD in Economics from the University of Illinois in 2012, where she was a student of Darren Lubotsky, Dan Bernhardt, Jeffrey Brown, and Robert Kaestner.

After completing her PhD, Miller joined the University of Michigan as a Robert Wood Johnson Foundation Scholar in Health Policy. In 2014, she became an assistant professor at the Ross School of Business, gaining tenure in 2022.

In addition to her academic appointments, Miller is co-editor of the Journal of Public Economics, and an associate editor at the Journal of Health Economics. She is also a research associate at the National Bureau of Economic Research. In 2022, Miller received the ASHEcon medal, awarded by the American Society of Health Economists to the best health economist under the age of 40.

Miller is married to Andres Hagemann, an econometrician and assistant professor of Business Economics and Public Policy at the University of Michigan Ross School of Business.

== Research ==
=== Infant mortality ===
In work with Maya Rossin-Slater, Laura Wherry, Petra Persson, Gloria Aldana, and Kate Kennedy-Moulton, Miller leverages administrative data from California to examine inequalities in infant mortality across the income distribution. She finds that the incidence of pre-term births increases at higher incomes, but that mortality falls as income rises.

Miller also shows that infant mortality in black families systematically exceeds that of white families, with infants born to black women at the top of the income distribution dying at higher rates than white women at the bottom of the income distribution.

=== Insurance expansions ===
Miller has also written several papers on the impacts of health insurance expansions, particularly the Affordable Care Act Medicaid expansions. In a paper with Laura Wherry and Norman Johnson in the Quarterly Journal of Economics, Miller shows that after the onset of the Affordable Care Act Medicaid expansions, near elderly mortality fell in expansion relative to non-expansion states, with results driven by disease-related deaths. Their results suggest that states' decisions not to expand Medicaid led to 15,600 excess deaths per year among those ages 55–64.

In related work published in the Journal of Public Economics, Miller and co-authors also show that the ACA Medicaid expansions improved the financial health of their beneficiaries, reducing the number and size of unpaid non-medical bills.

In work with Chloe East, Laura Wherry, and Marianne Page published in the American Economic Review, Miller shows that the grandchildren of low-income pregnant women who became Medicaid beneficiaries in the 1980s were less likely to have low birth weight than their non-insured counterparts.

=== Universal basic income ===
With Eva Vivalt, David Broockman, Alex Bartik, and Elizabeth Rhodes, Miller is a principal investigator on Y Combinator's universal basic income experiment, in which unconditional cash transfers of $1,000 per month will be delivered to over 1,000 study participants across two states.

== Selected Articles ==
- Hu, Luojia; Kaestner, Robert; Mazumder, Bhashkar; Miller, Sarah; Wong, Ashley (2018-07-01). "The effect of the affordable care act Medicaid expansions on financial wellbeing". Journal of Public Economics. 163: 99–112. doi:10.1016/j.jpubeco.2018.04.009. ISSN 0047-2727. PMC 6208351. PMID 30393411.
- Miller, Sarah; Wherry, Laura R. (2019-07-01). "The Long-Term Effects of Early Life Medicaid Coverage". Journal of Human Resources. 54 (3): 785–824. doi:10.3368/jhr.54.3.0816.8173R1. ISSN 0022-166X.
- Miller, Sarah; Johnson, Norman; Wherry, Laura R (2021-01-30). "Medicaid and Mortality: New Evidence From Linked Survey and Administrative Data". The Quarterly Journal of Economics. 136 (3): 1783–1829. doi:10.1093/qje/qjab004. ISSN 0033-5533.
- East, Chloe N.; Miller, Sarah; Page, Marianne; Wherry, Laura R. (January 2023). "Multigenerational Impacts of Childhood Access to the Safety Net: Early Life Exposure to Medicaid and the Next Generation's Health". American Economic Review. 113 (1): 98–135. doi:10.1257/aer.20210937. ISSN 0002-8282. PMC 10168672. PMID 37168104.
