= Maya Rossin-Slater =

American health economist

- Education: Columbia University (MA; PhD); University of California, Berkeley (BA)
- Awards: National Science Foundation CAREER Award; Elaine Bennett Research Prize
- Scientific career
- Fields: Health economics
- Workplaces: Stanford University
- Thesis: Social Policy and Family Well-Being: Essays in Applied Microeconomics (2013)
- Doctoral advisor: Janet Currie; Ilyana Kuziemko; Wojciech Kopczuk

Maya Rossin-Slater is an American health economist currently serving as Associate Professor of Health Policy in the Stanford University School of Medicine. Her research examines the causal effects of social policies and events in utero on the well-being of families and children in the United States. In 2023 Rossin-Slater received the Elaine Bennett Research Prize, awarded annually by the American Economic Association to the best female economist not more than ten years beyond her PhD. She is also the recipient of a National Science Foundation CAREER Award.

== Biography ==
Rossin-Slater received her BA in economics and statistics from the University of California, Berkeley and her MA and PhD in economics from Columbia University. At Columbia, she was a student of Janet Currie, Ilyana Kuziemko, and Wojciech Kopczuk.

In 2013 she joined the University of California, Santa Barbara as an assistant professor, moving to the Stanford University Department of Health Research and Policy in 2017. As of 2021, she served as Associate Professor of Health Policy at the Stanford University School of Medicine.

In addition to her academic positions, Rossin-Slater serves as an associate editor of the American Economic Journal: Economic Policy, co-editor of the Journal of Human Resources, and an associate editor at the Journal of Health Economics. She is affiliated with the IZA Institute of Labor Economics and National Bureau of Economic Research, and is a senior fellow at the Stanford Institute for Economic Policy Research.

In 2023 Rossin-Slater was selected as the winner of the Elaine Bennett Research Prize, awarded annually by the American Economic Association to the best female economist not more than ten years beyond her PhD.

== Research ==
Rossin-Slater's research focuses on the impact of social policies and exogenous pressures in utero on the well-being of families and children. She is the author or co-author of over 30 peer-reviewed articles.

=== Environmental shocks ===
In work with Adam Isen and Reed Walker, Rossin-Slater studies the labor market outcomes of children born in counties affected and unaffected by the statues of the Clean Air Act Amendments of 1970. She shows that those born in counties required to cut pollution had higher lifetime earnings and labor force participation.

Rossin-Slater has also studied the relationship between temperature shocks and long-run outcomes. In a paper with Isen and Walker in the Proceedings of the National Academy of Sciences, she shows that there exists a negative correlation between economic outcomes at age thirty and pre-natal exposure to days with temperatures exceeding 32 degrees Celsius. She finds that each additional day of exposure to temperatures over 32 degrees is associated with a 0.1% decrease in average income at age 30.

=== Social policy ===
Rossin-Slater has also studied the long-term effects of social policies in the United States. In a paper with Martha Bailey, Hilary Hoynes, and Reed Walker, Rossin-Slater leverages the county-level rollout of the Supplemental Nutrition Assistance Program from 1961 to 1975 to show that access to the program improved the economic and social outcomes of children covered before the age of five. She shows that covered children exhibited reduced risk of incarceration, higher life expectancy, and better neighborhood quality later in life.

In other work, Rossin-Slater leverages closures in WIC clinics in Texas to show that the women with access to the WIC had lower weight gain during pregnancy, and bore children of higher birth weight.

=== Parental leave ===
Rossin-Slater has also published a number of papers on paid family leave, in journals such as the Journal of Policy Analysis and Management, Journal of Health Economics, and Journal of Econometrics. In a recent National Bureau of Economic Research working paper, Rossin-Slater shows with Petra Persson that a reform to Sweden's parental leave system granting fathers the right to take intermittent parental leave on 30 select days reduced anti-anxiety prescriptions to mothers by 26%, and hospital visitations by 14%.

In another article Rossin-Slater compares the performance of similar businesses in New York, which in 2018 implemented a Paid Family Leave scheme, and Pennsylvania, which did not. She finds no change in New York employers' ratings of employee performance, and increases in employer's self-reported ease of managing prolonged absences.

=== Stress ===
In work with Petra Persson published in the American Economic Review leveraging administrative data from Sweden, Rossin-Slater shows that children born to mothers that experience bereavement stress because of the death of a family member are more likely to be treated for attention deficit hyperactivity disorder as a child and depression as an adult. She also finds that said children have lower birth weight.

== Selected publications ==
- Rossin-Slater, Maya. (2011). "The effects of maternity leave on children's birth and infant health outcomes in the United States." Journal of Health Economics, 30(2), 221–239. https://doi.org/10.1016/j.jhealeco.2011.01.005
- Rossin-Slater, Maya, Christopher J. Ruhm, and Jane Waldfogel. (2012). "The Effects of California's Paid Family Leave Program on Mothers' Leave-Taking and Subsequent Labor Market Outcomes." Journal of Policy Analysis and Management, 32(2), 224–245. https://doi.org/10.1002/pam.21676
- Currie, Janet and Maya Rossin-Slater. (2013). "Weathering the storm: Hurricanes and birth outcomes." Journal of Health Economics, 32(3), 487–503. https://doi.org/10.1016/j.jhealeco.2013.01.004
- Isen, Adam, Maya Rossin-Slater, and W. Reed Walker. (2017). "Every Breath You Take—Every Dollar You'll Make: The Long-Term Consequences of the Clean Air Act of 1970." Journal of Political Economy, 125(3), 848–902. https://doi.org/10.1086/691465
- Persson, Petra and Maya Rossin-Slater. (2018). "Family Ruptures, Stress, and the Mental Health of the Next Generation." American Economic Review, 108(4–5), 1214–1252. https://doi.org/10.1257/aer.20141406
