= Janet Currie =

Canadian economist

Janet M. Currie
- Born: Kingston, Ontario, Canada

Academic background
- Education: University of Toronto, Princeton University
- Doctoral advisors: Orley Ashenfelter, David Card, Angus Deaton

Academic work
- Discipline: economics of children, labour economics, family economics, health economics
- Institutions: Yale University; Princeton University; Columbia University; University of California, Los Angeles; The Massachusetts Institute of Technology
- Doctoral students: Maya Rossin-Slater Anna Aizer
- Website: https://economics.yale.edu/people/janet-currie

Janet Currie is a Canadian-American economist and the David Swensen Professor of Economics at Yale University. She co-directs the Tobin-Cowles Health Economics and Policy Program and the Children and Families Program at the National Bureau of Economic Research. Currie is a pioneer in the economic analysis of child development. She was named one of the top 10 women in economics by the World Economic Forum in July 2015. She is a member of the U.S. National Academy of Sciences, the National Academy of Medicine, the American Academy of Art and Sciences, and the British Academy.

== Education ==
Currie received a B.A. in economics in 1982 and a M.A. in economics in 1983 from the University of Toronto. She then pursued graduate studies at Princeton University, where she received a Ph.D. in economics in 1988.

== Career ==
Currie joined Yale University's Department of Economics in 2025 as the David Swensen Professor of Economics and is a member of the Cowles Foundation for Research in Economics.

In 2024, Currie served as president of the American Economic Association. That same year she was named as a Clarivate Citation Laureate, which is often cited as an indication of a future Nobel prize.

Currie was awarded the prestigious Klaus J. Jacobs Research Prize in 2023. The prize is considered the single most prestigious international award for child development. She previously received the NOMIS Foundation's Distinguished Scientist Award, 2019.

Currie served as the Chair of the Department of Economics at Princeton from 2014 to 2018, where she was the Henry Putnam Professor of Economics and Public Affairs. She also served as the first female Chair of the Department of Economics at Columbia University from 2006 to 2009. At Princeton, she co-directed the Center for Health and Wellbeing from 2011 to 2025. Before Columbia, she taught at the University of California, Los Angeles and at the Massachusetts Institute of Technology.

She is past president of the Society of Labor Economists, the Eastern Economics Association, the Western Economics Association, the American Society of Health Economics, and previously served as vice-president of the American Economic Association. Currie has served as a member of the Advisory Committee on Labor and Income Statistics for Statistics Canada and as a consultant for the National Health Interview Survey and the National Longitudinal Surveys. She has served on advisory boards of the National Children's Study, the Committee on National Statistics, the National Academy of Science, the Environmental Defense Fund, and Blue Health Intelligence, the American Academy of Political and Social Science, the board of governors of Hackensack Meridian School of Medicine, and the Opportunity and Inclusive Growth Institute at Federal Reserve Bank of Minneapolis. She was appointed by the New Jersey state legislature to the board of the New Jersey Integrated Population Health Data Project.

She served on the Board of Reviewing Editors for Science magazine from 2014–2018, and as the editor of the Journal of Economic Literature from 2010–2013. She has held various editorial roles for numerous economic peer-reviewed journals, including the Quarterly Journal of Economics, the Journal of Health Economics, the Journal of Economic Perspectives, the Journal of Population Economics, the American Economic Journal: Applied Economics, and the Journal of Public Economics.

== Research ==
Currie is best known for her work on the impact of poverty and government anti-poverty policies on the health and well-being of children over their life cycle. She has written about early intervention programs, expansions of the Medicaid program, public housing, and food and nutrition programs. Beginning the early 1990s, she was one of the first economists to evaluate such programs from the point of view of the child. In work with Duncan Thomas and Eliana Garces, she showed that children in a public preschool program named Head Start made gains relative to their own siblings in terms of both test scores and longer-term measures of attainment. In work with Jonathan Gruber, she showed that expansions of public health insurance to low income women and children improved access to care and reduced infant mortality. Research on the effects of the safety net on American children is reviewed in her books: Welfare and the Wellbeing of Children, and The Invisible Safety Net. More recently, she has advocated for cash transfers, in conjunction with other safety net programs, given their helpfulness in raising families out of poverty.

Currie has investigated broader socioeconomic determinants of fetal and child health, including health care, child maltreatment, nutrition, environmental pollution, and maternal education. Her work showing that the adoption of EZ-Pass improved infant health in Pennsylvania and New Jersey received wide attention. Some of her work showing disparities in fetal exposure to pollution and their consequences is summarized in her 2011 Distinguished Lecture to the American Economics Association. With Anna Aizer and Hannes Schwandt, she has shown that inequality in mortality is falling among U.S. children, at the same time that inequality in mortality among adults has been increasing, and attributed this improvement to the protective effect of safety net programs. Her work on health care has focused on differences in physician behavior as one of the key determinants in variation in the care both children and adults receive. Currie's work on child mental health shows that mental health is a stronger predictor of future outcomes than many common childhood physical health problems and that children's mental health is impacted by early life factors. Currie's 2025 Presidential address to the American Economic Association emphasized the importance of youth mental health, the long-standing nature of the youth mental health crisis, and outlined promising steps to address the crisis.

Overall, her work shows that early childhood, including the fetal period, is of great importance for the development of children's productive capabilities (their 'human capital') and that programs targeting early childhood can be particularly effective in remediating childhood disadvantage.

This work represents a departure from early work on collective bargaining in the public sector.

== Awards ==
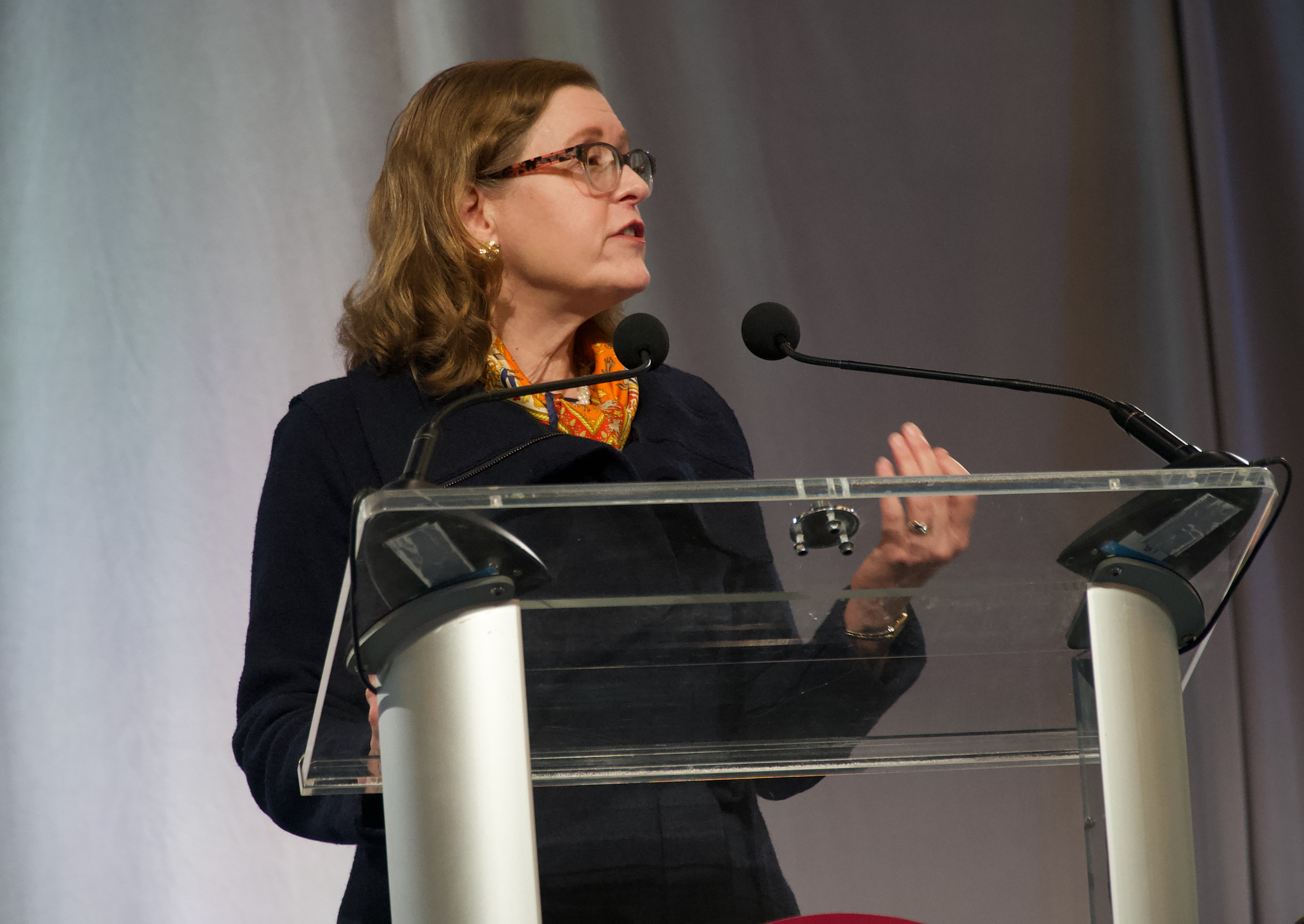
Janet Currie at ASSA 2025

Currie holds honorary degrees from the University of Lyon, the University of Zurich, and the Università della Svizzera Italiana.

In 2024, Currie received the Jacob Mincer Award for lifetime contributions to labor economics, and in 2026, she received the Victor Fuchs Award for lifetime contributions to health economics, and the Sara McLanahan Award for extraordinary contributions to research on the well-being of children and families. Janet Currie is a distinguished CES Fellow, and a fellow of the Econometric Society, the Society of Labor Economists, the Rockwool Foundation, and the American Academy of Political and Social Science.

She was recognized for her mentorship of younger economists with the Carolyn Shaw Bell Award from the American Economics Association in 2015 and also participated in the founding and evaluation of the AEA's CSWEP mentoring program for junior faculty.

== Personal ==
She is married to W. Bentley MacLeod, professor emeritus of economics at Columbia University, and visiting professor and senior research scientist at Yale. They have two children.

== Awards and honors ==
- Fellow of the Society of Labor Economics, elected May 2006
- Named by University College, University of Toronto as one of its Alumni of Influence in 2012
- Fellow of the Econometric Society, elected 2013
- Member of the National Academy of Medicine, elected 2013
- Member of the American Academy of Arts and Sciences, elected 2014
- Eleanor Roosevelt Fellow, American Academy of Political and Social Science, 2014
- Honorary Doctorate, University of Lyon, 2016
- Honorary Doctorate, University of Zurich, 2017
- NOMIS Distinguished Scientist Award, 2019
- Member of the National Academy of Sciences, elected 2019
- Klaus J. Jacobs Research Prize for work aimed at improving learning, development, and living conditions of children and youth, 2023
- Distinguished CES Fellow, 2023
- Honorary Doctorate, Università della Svizzera italiana, 2024
- 2024 Society of Labor Economists Jacob Mincer Award honoring lifetime contributions to the field of labor economics
- International Fellow of the British Academy, elected July 2024
- 2024 Clarivate Citation Laureate of the Institute for Scientific Information
- Research Fellow Rockwool Foundation Berlin – Institute for the Economy and the Future of Work, September 2025
- Victor R. Fuchs Award for Lifetime Contributions to the Field of Health Economics, American Society of Health Economics, 2026
- The Population Association of America Sara McLanahan Award, 2026
