= Adriana Lleras-Muney =

American economist

Adriana Lleras-Muney (born Adriana Lleras Salazar) is a Colombian-American economist. She is currently a professor in the Department of Economics at UCLA. She was appointed as associate editor for the Journal of Health Economics in 2014, and she was elected as one of the six members of the American Economic Association executive committee in 2018. Her research focuses on socio-economic status and health with a particular emphasis on education, income, and economic development. In 2017, she was received the Presidential Early Career Awards for Scientists and Engineers from President Obama.

== Education and career ==
Adriana Lleras-Muney obtained her associate degree from the University of Paris, after which she continued her senior year at University of Louisiana. Lleras-Muney earned her Ph.D. in economics at Columbia University, afterward she worked as an assistant professor in the Department of Economics and the Woodrow Wilson School of International and Public Affairs at Princeton University. In the summer of 2008, Lleras-Muney was a visiting scholar in the Department of Economics at Yale University. From 2008 through to 2012, she was an associate professor with tenure in the Department of Economics of UCLA, and she was promoted to professor in 2012. In addition to her academic position, Lleras-Muney has attended as the Editor of the Journal of Health Economics, and was later promoted to associate editor. In addition, since 2011 she has been on the Board of Editors for the American Economic Journal: Economic Policy and since 2016 the Board of Editors for Demography. Furthermore, as of 2013 she has gained her position as a permanent member of the Social Sciences and Population Studies Study Section at the National Institute of Health. Also, she has a position in the faculty at the California Centre for Population Research (CCPR) since 2008 and serves as a research associate at the National Bureau of Economic Research (NBER) since 2009 to present.

One of Adriana Lleras-Muney's most prestigious accomplishments has been the appointment of one of the 102 recipients of the Presidential Early Career Awards for Scientists and Engineers (PECASE). This award is regarded to be the highest honour granted by the United States Government in the fields of science and engineering for their independent research careers in their early stages. Lleras-Muney received this appointment in the Department of Health and Human Services. The recipients of the PECASE are rewarded for their impactful contributions to the United States and the award shows the impacts of Federal investments in the field of science to the contribution to the economy.

== Research ==
Adriana Lleras-Muney's research interests include health, income, gender, economic development, determinants of fertility and education.

=== “Mind the Gap: A Review of The Health Gap: The Challenge of an Unequal World by Sir Michael Marmot” (2018) ===
Adriana Lleras-Muney investigates The Health Gap which focuses on the health gaps within developed, rich countries today. Compared to other developed countries, the US faces substantial gaps in health and mortality rates depending on socio-economic status. Some developed countries have managed to reduce the health gap over time. Sir Michael Marmot argues that low socioeconomic status are driving factors of low health status. Moreover, Marmot expresses that in order to overcome this health gap, it is important to look into the deeper causes of occurring health gaps. Proximate factors such as easier access to health care is not a deep cause. What he believes to be the root causes are poverty, education and occupational mobility. In addition, Marmot observations go into policies that have succeeded in reducing the gap and an overall improvement in health.

=== "Breaking the Glass Ceiling? The Effect of Board Quotas on Female Labor Market Outcomes in Norway" (2018) ===
Adriana Lleras-Muney co-authored this article with Marianne Bertrand (Chicago Booth School of Business, CEPR, IZA and NBER), Sandra E. Black (University of Texas, Austin, NHH, ICA and NBER), Sissel Jensen (Norwegian School of Economics). This paper examines the effects of the Norwegian Law that was passed in 2003 on the Female Labor Market. The Law mandated the board of public limited liability companies to have each gender representation at 40%, this law was enforced with the mission to increase the percentage of women representatives in the top tier of corporate sectors and to reduce the gender wage gap. From the proximate results, there was a reduction in the gender wage disparity within the boards, as well as the women that were appointed new roles in the boards were more qualified than previous female representatives. However, the new law did not have much effect on: the other women in the company and women how are highly qualified but were not appointed for the position on the board. Moreover, it could not be concluded strongly that this implementation had positive effects on young women. A factor that backs this uncertainty is that there was no change in female enrolment in business education programs. This investigation concluded that whilst the passing of the law had direct influences on the women and wage disparity of those that were appointed seats on the board, it did not have enough effect to have a positive influence on women in business.

=== “The Long-Run Impact of Cash Transfers to Poor Families” (2016) ===
Alongside Anna Aizer (Brown University & NBER), Shari Eli (University of Toronto & NBER), Joseph Ferrie (Northwestern University & NBER), Adriana Lleras-Muney investigated the long-term impacts of cash transfers to poor families based on the factors of children longevity, educational attainment, nutritional status, and income in adulthood. In order to reduce poverty the U.S. primarily supports those that are in need of aid by offering specific foods, shelter, insurance, etc. These are all objects, however this paper examines the benefits of giving poor families cash instead of these specific goods. In order to investigate this case, data and records of individual applicants were collected from the Mothers’ Pension program. This investigation was conducted by tracking the lives of the children born between 1900 and 1925 from the families that received or were denied cash through the Mothers’ Pension program. From aligning data alongside World War II enlistment records they were able to come to the result that cash transfers decreased the risk of children being underweight at the time of enrolment. The paper addresses the concern that giving cash to poor mothers could be used in inappropriate ways, however the results have shown that on average, the recipients of cash were able to improve the lives of their children.

=== "The Determinants of Mortality" (2006) ===
In this paper, written jointly with Angus Deaton (Princeton University) and David Cutler (Harvard University), Lleras-Muney investigates the causes of the decline in the mortality rate -and its associated health benefits- of developed countries. The authors point to the historical factors that were known to change mortality rate: improvement in nutrition, public health, urbanization, vaccination, and medical technology as evidence that in the past, government spending and economic growth were closely linked with better public health. However, they believe that this link no longer exists, citing vast discrepancies between the percent of GDP spent on healthcare between developed countries as an example of diminishing marginal returns. They assert that income, especially in the modern era, is relatively unimportant to the reduction of mortality rates as compared to institutional ability and political willingness to implement new technology.

=== “Booms, Busts, and Babies’ Health” (2004) ===
This paper was joint written with Rajeev Dehejia (Columbia University and NBER) and Ariana Lleras-Muney. It was published on The Quarterly Journal of Economics in 2004. This investigation was conducted through observing data from the Natality Files from 1975. The aim of this investigation was to find a relationship between the unemployment rate of the period that a baby is conceived and the characteristics, behaviours of parents and the babies health. The results was a positive correlation that those babies conceived during the period of high unemployment they were healthy in several ways. For example, there was reduced incidences of low and very low birth weight, fewer congenital malformations, and a reduced rate of post-neonatal mortality. This could be the result of better health behaviours amongst women during their pregnant months if it was a time of high unemployment. There was a correlation in the dimension of race in the selected women too. The results showed that less-educated single Black mothers were less likely to conceive during times of high unemployment. This raised the average health of Black babies. On the other hand, the mothers that were more likely to have babies during this time period was the less-educated White mothers. In addition Black mothers were less likely to take risky actions such as smoking, however it was the opposite result for Whites. What was concluded from this investigation was that skill depreciation plays an important role in fertility decisions and that there are clear differences between Black and White mothers. Secondly, this paper expressed the importance of taking time off work in order to commit to prenatal care as the results show the behavioural change of pregnant women in times of unemployment. There are reasons to suggest that improving the outcomes of birth could be a policy objective.

== Selected works ==
- “The Effect of Education on Health and Mortality: A Review of Experimental and Quasi-Experimental Evidence.”
- "Booms, Busts and Babies' Health."
- "Child Gender and Parental Investments In India: Are Boys and Girls Treated Differently?"
- "Breaking the Glass Ceiling? The Effect of Board Quotas on Female Labor Market Outcomes in Norway."
- "When Does Education Matter? The Protective Effect of Education for Cohorts Graduating in Bad Times."
- "Did the Americanization Movement Succeed? An Evaluation of the Effect of English-Only and Compulsory Schools Laws on Immigrants' Education."
- "Does staying in school (and not working) prevent teen smoking and drinking?"

== Selected awards ==
- 2017 Winner of the Warren C. Scoville Distinguished Teaching Award (fall quarter)
- 2017 Presidential Early Career Award for Scientists and Engineers, awarded by President Obama
- 2014 California Center for Population Research seed grant
- 2013 Grant from the Academic Senate UCLA
- 2011 NIH Grant #1 R03 HD066035-01A1 “Child Gender and Parental Investments: Are Boys and Girls Treated Differently” with Leandro
