= Joseph Doyle (economist) =

American economist

- Education: Cornell University (BS); University of Chicago (PhD)
- Scientific career
- Fields: Economics; Health economics Public economics
- Workplaces: MIT Sloan School of Management
- Thesis: Can't buy me love? Subsidizing the care of grandchildren (2002)
- Doctoral advisors: Mark Duggan, Michael Greenstone, Steven Levitt

Joseph J. Doyle Jr. is an American economist and the Erwin H. Schell Professor of Management at the MIT Sloan School of Management. His research focuses on the public economics of healthcare and child welfare. He currently serves as co-director of the MIT Sloan Initiative for Health Systems Innovation and as co-chair of the Health Sector of the Abdul Latif Jameel Poverty Action Lab (J-PAL).

== Biography ==
Joseph Doyle earned a B.A. from Cornell University in 1996, after which he worked as an assistant economist at the Federal Reserve Bank of New York (1996–98) while studying at the Courant Institute of Mathematical Sciences (1997–98). Thereafter, Doyle obtained a Ph.D. in economics with a focus on econometrics and the economics of the public sector from the University of Chicago in 2002. After completing his studies, he began his career at the MIT Sloan School of Management as an assistant professor (2002–05). In 2005, Doyle became the Jon D. Gruber Career Development Assistant Professor (2005–08), then associate professor (2008–09), the Alfred Henry and Jean Morrison Hayes Career Development Associate Professor (2009-2013), and has been the Erwin H. Schell Professor of Management since 2013. In parallel, Doyle has held visiting appointments at the Paris School of Economics (2010) and the European University Institute (2017-18). Doyle is co-director of the MIT Sloan Initiative for Health Systems Innovation and maintains professional affiliations with the Abdul Latif Jameel Poverty Action Lab (J-PAL) as co-chair of its Health Sector, with the NBER as research associate, and with the Danish National Centre for Social Research as a research fellow. Moreover, he performs editorial duties at the Journal of Human Resources, served as co-editor of the Journal of Public Economics (2012–16) and is a member of the American Economic Association as well as of the American Society of Health Economists.

== Research ==
Doyle's research interests are public economics, health economics, and labor economics. Key findings of his research include:

- Children in the U.S. on the margin of being placed in foster care (e.g. in cases where the recommendations of child protection investigators disagree) are on average better off if they remain at home, especially for older children.
- Juvenile incarceration in the U.S. decreases the likelihood of incarcerated individuals completing high school and increases the likelihood of adult (re-)incarceration.
- Children in the U.S. on the margin of placement in foster care are two to three times more likely to enter the criminal justice system as adults if they were placed in foster care, a situation that is disproportionately common for African Americans, girls and young adolescents.

In particular, Doyle's research with Douglas Almond, Heidi Williams and Amanda E. Kowalski on the marginal returns of medical care for at-risk newborns was awarded the Garfield Economic Impact Award by Research America in 2011. The study showed that medical care prescribed as a result of newborns being slightly below the critical birthweight threshold of 1,500 grams was effective in substantially decreasing the mortality of these newborns relative to newborns slightly above the threshold. The authors then use the cost of the decrease in mortality rates for these newborns to estimate the cost for saving a newborn's statistical life to be about $550,000 in 2006 US$, i.e., well below common estimates of the value of a full statistical life.
