= Petra Persson =

Swedish economist

- Born: Sweden

Academic background
- Education: Stockholm University (BA); Stockholm School of Economics (MSc); Columbia University (PhD)
- Doctoral advisor: Navin Kartik

Academic work
- Discipline: Public Economics; Labour Economics; Socioeconomics
- Institutions: Stanford University
- Website: web.stanford.edu/~perssonp

Petra Persson is a Swedish economist and associate professor in economics at Stanford University. Persson is best known for her work in public and labor economics where her research focuses on the interactions between family decisions and the policy environment. Specifically, Persson's research agenda is centered on studying government policy, family wellbeing, and informal institutions.

Persson is a Research Associate at the National Bureau of Economic Research where she has produced notable research on paternity leave, family ruptures, and maternal health. Previously, Persson was a Postdoctoral Fellow at the Stanford Institute for Economic Policy Research and Predoctoral Fellow at the Harvard Kennedy School Women and Public Policy Program.

== Education and career ==
Persson attended Stockholm University where she completed her B.A. in Political Science and Mathematics. Persson went on to complete her M.Sc. in economics at the Stockholm School of Economics and her Ph.D. in economics at Columbia University. Persson wrote her PhD dissertation on relationships and communication, with chapters on social insurance and the marriage market, attention manipulation and information overload, and paternalism and libertarianism.

Persson started her career as an Analyst at Goldman Sachs, followed by work at the World Bank as a Research Associate. Thereafter, Persson worked in postdoctoral fellow positions at the Stanford Institute for Economic Policy Research and the Stanford Center for International Development. She currently works as an assistant professor in economics at Stanford University and is a Faculty Research Fellow at the National Bureau of Economic Research.

Professionally, Persson is a referee for the American Economic Journal, International Economic Review, Journal of Labor Economics, Journal of Public Economics, and the National Science Foundation.

== Teaching ==
In her current role as assistant professor at Stanford University, Persson teaches two PhD courses in the Department of Economics. In Economics 243, Persson examines household interactions with the social insurance system, including Social Security, health insurance, unemployment insurance, parental insurance, and targeting of social insurance. In Economics 300, Persson teaches third-year PhD students on the development of a research paper.

== Academic affiliations ==
In her academic career, Persson has worked in a number of academic affiliate and fellow positions:

- 2024-2025: Faculty Fellow, Stanford Clayman Institute for Gender Research
- 2024-current: International Fellow, NHH Centre for Experimental Research on Fairness, Inequality and Rationality
- 2017-current: Distinguished Research Affiliate, CESifo Research Network
- 2016-current: Faculty Research Fellow, National Bureau of Economic Research
- 2015-current: Research Affiliate, Centre for Economic Policy Research
- 2015-current: Faculty Fellow, Stanford Institute for Economic Policy Research
- 2011-2024: Research Affiliate, Research Institute of Industrial Economics

== Research ==
Persson has focused on interactions between family decisions and the policy environment, with her research centered around three key themes:

1. Family behavior and government policy
2. Family behavior and family wellbeing
3. Family behavior and informal institutions

=== Research on family behavior and government policy ===
==== Social Insurance and the Marriage Market (2018) ====
In her 2018 paper, “Social Insurance and the Marriage Market”, Persson analyzes how linking survivors’ insurance to marriage affects the marriage market. Using data from Sweden's elimination of survivors' insurance in 1989, Persson finds that eliminating survivors’ insurance lowers the long-run rate of entry into marriage from cohabitation, raises divorce rates for matched but unmarried couples, and increases assertiveness of matching for both unmatched and unmarried individuals. Further, Persson's findings suggest that marriage is commonly used as a mechanism for long-term financial planning.

==== When Dad Stays Home (2019) ====
Persson and Maya Rossin-Slater assess, through a regression difference-in-differences (RD-DD) model, the impacts of paternal access to workplace flexibility on maternal postpartum health. Starting from Kim Weeden et al. (2016)'s finding that mothers face greater expectations to be "on call" for unforeseen domestic needs, Persson's paper analyzes father's demand for workplace flexibility and the spillover effects on maternal wellbeing. Persson employs administrative data from Sweden's “Double Days” reform whereby both parents could use full-time leave benefits at the same time for up to 30 days. Through this analysis, Persson finds that increasing a father's temporal flexibility reduces the risk of the mother experiencing postpartum health complications. Moreover, Persson reaffirms that mothers currently bear a disproportionate burden from both career costs and a fathers' inability to respond to domestic shocks.

=== Research on family behavior and family wellbeing ===
==== Financing from Family and Friends (2015) ====
In reviewing the informal finance market, Persson investigates why borrowers tend to prefer formal financing despite family and friend investors being willing to accept below-market or negative returns. Persson finds that familial loans are associated with shadow costs and a lack of formal liability, which drives borrowers to formal lending markets. Specifically, Persson reviews the effects of social debt, where borrowers provide disproportionate favors to compensate lenders for providing capital at below-market rates. Persson's research observes that social lending intermediaries such as community lending pools can harness social capital while minimizing familial shadow costs.

==== Family Ruptures, Stress, and the Mental Health of the Next Generation (2016) ====
In this American Economic Review paper, Persson and Maya Rossin-Slater study how exposure to maternal stress from familial ruptures affects later mental health. Specifically, they use empirical data from Sweden to isolate the in-utero effect of exposure to the death of a maternal loss compared to babies born who experience a loss within the first year of life. The authors find that this exposure is related to negative birth outcomes, increased risk of infant hospitalization, and increased take-up of ADHD medications during childhood and anti-anxiety and depression medications in adulthood. Their findings suggest large potential welfare gains by preventing fetal stress from family ruptures and socioeconomic factors. After being accepted for publication, their preprint attracted criticism for allegedly omitting citations of similar studies. The paper was updated to include a reference to a similar paper before being published. A comment criticised how the authors defined the control group, arguing that their definition risked finding a significant effect when there is none. Persson and Rossin-Slater agreed with the critique and said that their results were mostly unchanged after they re-estimated them using the control group suggested by the comment.

==== Human Trafficking and Regulating Prostitution (2018) ====
Through this paper with Samuel Lee, Persson studies the prostitution market with both voluntary and coerced workers. In this analysis, Persson attempts to identify a policy tool that would restore the benchmark outcome that would arise under a laissez-faire market without any coerced workers. Persson examines several policies, including decriminalization, criminalization of buyers or suppliers, and licensing, identifying that each policy is either ineffective against trafficking or harm voluntary suppliers. Persson ultimately highlights an alternative policy combining the Dutch and Swedish models, where prostitution is licensed and johns who buy sex from unlicensed prostitutes are criminalized, which would restore the benchmark outcome whereby trafficking is decreased and voluntary prostitution increases.

==== The Roots of Health Inequality and the Value of Intra-Family Expertise (2019) ====
Working with Yiqun Chen and Maria Polyakova, Persson explores the correlation between income and health, specifically through familial access to health expertise. Persson uses Sweden as an empirical setting, which has minimal inequality in terms of formal access to health care and still find strong socioeconomic gradients. Leveraging a quasi-experimental approach using non-parametric data from admissions lotteries to Swedish medical schools, Persson finds that access to intra-family medical expertise can explain 18% of the health-socioeconomic status (SES) difference. Persson further illustrates that access to intra-family expertise has a number of positive health impacts, increasing life expectancy, reducing lifestyle-related disease, and improving drug adherence. Persson further finds that the effects of lack of access to expertise are larger at lower income brackets, which is commonly where access to expertise is lower.

== Academic publications ==
=== Publications list ===
Year	Title	Publication	Author(s)
2016	The Limits of Career Concerns in Federalism: Evidence from China	Journal of the European Economic Association, 14(2): 338–374	Petra Persson, Ekaterina Zhuravskaya
2016	Violence and Entry in Prostitution Markets: Implications for Prostitution Law	Oxford University Press, Handbook of the Economics of Prostitution, ed. Scott Cunningham and Manisha Shah.	Petra Persson, Samuel Lee
2016	Financing from Family and Friends	Review of Financial Studies, 29(9): 2341–2386	Petra Persson, Samuel Lee
2017	Attention Manipulation and Information Overload	Behavioural Public Policy, 2(1), 78–106.	Petra Persson
2018	Family Ruptures, Stress, and the Mental Health of the Next Generation	American Economic Review, 108(4–5): 1214–52	Petra Persson, Maya Rossin-Slater
2020	Social Insurance and the Marriage Market	Journal of Political Economy, 128(1): 252–300	Petra Persson
2020	Does Medicine Run in the Family: Evidence from Three Generations of Physicians in Sweden	British Medical Journal, 371:m4453	Petra Persson, Maria Polyakova, Katja Hofmann, Anupam B. Jena
2022	The Roots of Health Inequality and the Value of Intra-Family Expertise	American Economic Journal, 14(3): 185–223	Petra Persson, Yiqun Chen, Maria Polyakova
2022	Human Trafficking and Regulating Prostitution	American Economic Journal, 14(3): 78–127	Petra Persson, Samuel Lee
2022	A Taste of Their Own Medicine: Guideline Adherence and Access to Expertise	American Economic Journal, 4(4): 507–526	Petra Persson, Amy Finkelstein, Maria Polyakova, Jesse M. Shapiro

=== Working papers ===
- The Long-term Consequences of Teacher Discretion in Grading of High-Stakes Tests (October 2017)
- Take-Up, Drop-Out, and Spending in ACA Marketplaces (January 2019)
- When Dad Can Stay Home: Fathers’ Workplace Flexibility and Maternal Health (October 2019)
- Insurance without Commitment: Evidence from the ACA Marketplaces (December 2020)
- Family Spillover Effects of Marginal Diagnoses: The Case of ADHD (October 2022)
- Targeting Precision Medicine: Evidence from Prenatal Screening (November 2022)
- Maternal and Infant Health Inequality: New Evidence from Linked Administrative Data (November 2022)

== Recognition and awards ==
Through her academic career, Persson has received several grants and awards, including the Fulbright Scholarship in 2007, Hewlett Foundation/IIE award in 2012, Spectrum Grant in 2016, and a research grant from the Eunice Kennedy Shriver National Institute of Child Health and Development in 2019.

Persson completed a research fellowship at the Harvard Kennedy School's women and public policy program in 2012. Additionally, Persson has worked at Stanford University as an IRiSS faculty fellow and Brown faculty fellow.

Grants, fellowships, and awards
Year	Title	Affiliation
2012	Dissertation Fellowship in Population, Reproductive Health and Economic Development	Hewlett Foundation/IIE
2012	Dissertation Fellowship, Center for Retirement Research	Boston College
2012	Research Fellowship, Women and Public Policy Program	Harvard Kennedy School
2013	Research Grant	Royal Swedish Academy of Sciences
2016	Spectrum Grant for Population Health Sciences	National Institutes of Health
2016	Health, Working Life and Welfare Grant	Swedish Research Council
2017	Distinguished Research Affiliate Award	Ifo Institute for Economic Research
2019	Brown Faculty Fellow	Stanford University
