= Aizer =

Aizer is a surname. Notable people with the surname include:

- Anna Aizer, American professor of economics
- Dave Aizer (born 1974), American television host, writer, and producer
