= Amanda Kowalski =

Amanda Kowalski may refer to:

- Amanda Kowalski (economist), American economist
- Amanda Kowalski (soccer) (born 1998), American soccer player
