= Melissa Kearney =

American economist (born 1974)

Melissa Schettini Kearney
- Born: Melissa Jean Schettini; 1974 (age 51–52)
- Education: Princeton University (BA); Massachusetts Institute of Technology (PhD)
- Spouse: Daniel Patrick Kearney Jr.
- Children: 3
- Scientific career
- Fields: Economics
- Workplaces: Wellesley College; Brookings Institution; University of Maryland; University of Notre Dame
- Doctoral advisor: Jonathan Gruber and Joshua Angrist
- Website: www.melissakearney.com

Melissa Schettini Kearney (born 1974) is an American economist who is the Gilbert F. Schaefer Professor of Economics at the University of Notre Dame, and a research associate at the National Bureau of Economic Research (NBER). Prior to joining the economics department at the University of Notre Dame in 2025, she spent more than two decades on the Economics faculty at the University of Maryland. She is also director of the Aspen Economic Strategy Group; a non-resident Senior Fellow at The Brookings Institution; a scholar affiliate and member of the board of the Notre Dame Wilson-Sheehan Lab for Economic Opportunities (LEO); and a scholar affiliate of the MIT Abdul Jameel Poverty Action Lab (J-PAL). She has been an editor of the Journal of Human Resources and an editorial board member of the American Economic Journal: Economic Policy and of the Journal of Economic Literature. Kearney served as director of the Hamilton Project at Brookings from 2013 to 2015 and as co-chair of the JPAL State and Local Innovation Initiative from 2015 to 2018.

== Education ==
Kearney graduated with highest honors from Princeton University with an A.B. in economics in 1996 and was inducted as a member of Phi Beta Kappa. She received the Wolf Balleisen Memorial Award from for completing her 96-page long senior thesis, titled "The Economic Determinants of Age at First Birth in United States Metropolitan Areas: An Empirical Analysis", under the supervision of Anne Case. She then pursued graduate studies with the support of a NSF Graduate Research Fellowship and a Harry S. Truman Scholarship at the Massachusetts Institute of Technology, where she received a PhD in economics in 2002 after completing a doctoral dissertation, titled "Essays on public policy and consumer choice: applications to welfare reform and state lotteries", under the supervision of Jonathan Gruber and Joshua Angrist.

== Research ==
Kearney's research focuses on issues related to social policy, poverty, and inequality. She has published numerous academic studies related to the economics of families and childbearing, including work on teen childbearing. Early in her career she published a study documenting that the controversial welfare family cap policy did not lead to a reduction in births, as intended. That policy has since been repealed in many states. More recently, in work with Phillip Levine, Kearney has published studies on the link between non-marital childbearing and childhood resources and proposed that teen childbearing is a consequence of the "economics of despair." In subsequent work published by the Brookings Institution, the authors document a similar finding with regard to high school drop-out behavior. On the issue of birth rates, a June 2020 Brookings study by Kearney and Levine predicted that the COVID pandemic would lead to a "baby bust", despite popular accounts suggesting there would be a pandemic "baby boom".

In work with Phillip B. Levine, receiving attention in the popular media, Kearney found that greater access to Sesame Street in the show's early days led to improved early educational outcomes for children. Kearney and Levine also found that MTV’s 16 and Pregnant and Teen Mom programs led to a sizable reduction in teen births, accounting for as much as one-third of the overall decline in teen births in the year and a half following the show's introduction in 2009.

Kearney has written extensively about income inequality, in both academic journals and policy essays, and has testified before the Congress on the topic of U.S. income inequality. She co-authored a 2013 proposal for a Secondary Earner Tax Deduction that formed the basis for a tax proposal included in proposed legislation and in Obama's proposed 2015 budget. Kearney coauthored a 2020 study titled "Explaining the decline in the U.S. employment-to-population ratio: a review of the evidence” with former Commissioner of the U.S. Bureau of Labor Statistics Katharine G. Abraham that examines employment trends for the period from 1999 to 2018 and seeks to explain the economic factors driving them. They conclude that labor demand factors are the most important drivers of the overall decline in the employment–population ratio among 25- to 54-year-olds over the period.

In 2023, Kearney published The Two-Parent Privilege: How Americans Stopped Getting Married and Started Falling Behind, showing how the decline of the institution of marriage has resulted in numerous of economic woes—problems that have harmed vulnerable populations, and documenting the significant benefits to children of being reared in two-parent households.

=== Selected works ===
- KG Abraham, MS Kearney, 2020, "Explaining the decline in the U.S. employment-to-population ratio: a review of the evidence," Journal of Economic Literature 58 (3): 585–643.
- MS Kearney, R Wilson, 2018 "Male Earnings, Marriageable Men, and Non-Marital Fertility: Evidence from the Fracking Boom," Review of Economics and Statistics 100(4): 678-690.
- MS Kearney, PB Levine, 2017 "The Economics of Non-Marital Childbearing and the Marriage Premium for Children," Annual Review of Economics (9).
- MS Kearney, 2016 "Should we be concerned about income inequality?" in Ed. Michael Strain, The U.S. Labor Market: Questions and Challenges for U.S. Policy. Washington D.C.: American Enterprise Institute.
- MS Kearney, PB Levine, 2016 "Income Inequality, Social Mobility, and the Decision to Drop-Out of High School." Brookings Papers on Economic Activity.
- MS Kearney, PB Levine, 2015 “Investigating Recent Trends in the U.S. Teen Birth Rates,” Journal of Health Economics (41).
- MS Kearney, LJ Dettling, 2014, “House Prices and Birth Rates: The Impact of the Real Estate Market on the Decision to Have a Baby,” Journal of Public Economics.
- MS Kearney, L Turner, 2013 "Giving Secondary Earners a Tax Break: A Proposal to Help Low- and Middle-Income Families." The Hamilton Project.
- MS Kearney, PB Levine, 2012 "Why is the teen birth rate in the United States so high and why does it matter?" Journal of Economic Perspectives.
- DH Autor, LF Katz, MS Kearney, 2008 "Trends in US wage inequality: Revising the revisionists" The Review of economics and statistics 90 (2), 300–323
- DH David, LF Katz, MS Kearney, 2008 "The polarization of the US labor market" American economic review 96 (2), 189–194
- J Guryan, E Hurst, M Kearney, 2008 "Parental education and parental time with children" Journal of Economic perspectives 22 (3), 23–46
- MS Kearney, 2005 "State lotteries and consumer behavior" Journal of Public Economics 89 (11–12), 2269–2299
- MS Kearney, 2004 "Is There an Effect of Incremental Welfare Benefits on Fertility Behavior? A Look at the Family Cap” Journal of Human Resources.

== Policy work ==
Kearney was the fifth director and first female director of The Hamilton Project, following a prestigious group of former directors, all of whom played significant roles in public service, including founding director Peter Orszag, who went on to become director of the Congressional Budget Office and then director of the White House Office of Management and Budget, Jason Furman, who subsequently served as chairman of the President's Council of Economic Advisers, and Douglas Elmendorf, who subsequently directed the Congressional Budget Office and is now Dean of the Kennedy School at Harvard University. Under Kearney's leadership, the Hamilton Project worked on a variety of policy topics, including domestic poverty, labor market challenges and the future of work, and mass incarceration. Together with Benjamin H. Harris, Kearney co-edited the Hamilton Project book Policies to Address Poverty in America.

Kearney has served as director of the Aspen Economic Strategy Group since 2017. The Aspen Economic Strategy Group (AESG) was launched in 2017 under the leadership of co-chairs Henry M. Paulson, Jr., former secretary of the Treasury and chairman of Goldman Sachs, and Erskine Bowles, former White House chief of staff and president of the University of North Carolina system. Luke Pardue, who holds a PhD in economics from the University of Maryland, is the group's policy director. The AESG fosters the exchange of economic policy ideas and seeks to clarify the lines of debate on emerging economic issues while promoting bipartisan relationship-building among current and future generations of policy leaders in Washington.
