= David Cutler =

American economist

- Born: June 22, 1965 (age 61); Cleveland, Ohio, U.S.
- Political party: Democratic

Academic background
- Education: Harvard University (BA); Massachusetts Institute of Technology (PhD)
- Doctoral advisor: James M. Poterba

Academic work
- Discipline: Economics
- Doctoral students: Heidi Williams; Marcella Alsan
- Website: Information at IDEAS / RePEc

David Matthew Cutler (born June 22, 1965) is an American economist who is the Otto Eckstein Professor of Applied Economics at Harvard University and the dean of the Social Sciences division of the Faculty of Arts and Sciences. He was given a five-year term appointment of Harvard College Professor, which recognizes excellence in undergraduate teaching. He holds a joint appointment in the economics department and at the Harvard Kennedy School and the Harvard School of Public Health, is a faculty member for the Harvard Center for Population and Development Studies, and serves as commissioner on the Massachusetts Health Policy Commission.

== Biography ==
Cutler graduated from Harvard College, summa cum laude, with a degree in economics, and then joined the Harvard faculty after receiving his Ph.D. in economics from the Massachusetts Institute of Technology in 1991. He served in the administration of Bill Clinton and was the senior health care advisor to Barack Obama. From 2003 to 2008, Cutler was Dean of the Faculty of Arts and Sciences for Social Sciences.

His book Your Money or Your Life gives an introduction on the US health care system. The book and Cutler's ideas were the subject of an article in the New York Times Magazine, "The Quality Cure". Professor Cutler published a book with the same title in 2014 which details how "Focusing on Health Care Quality Can Save Your Life and Lower Spending Too."

Cutler's 2003 study "Why have Americans become more obese?" discusses rising obesity as an outcome of the revolution in mass food packaging. He includes vacuum packing, improved preservatives, deep freezing, and microwaves as culprits. Consumer prices on items like various frozen foods, soda, and potato chips are increasing at half the rate of fresh fruits and vegetables, and mass preparation makes for lower costs and more food consumption.

== Movement of individuals across health care plans ==
An article, ″Selection Stories: Understanding Movement across Health Plans,″ was written by Cutler, Bryan Lincoln, and Richard Zeckhauser and published in the Journal of Health Economics in 2010. It explored why some employees who participate in employee-sponsored insurance programs change enrollment status between Health Maintenance Organization-managed care and fee for service options. The authors theorized that there are three different health insurance selection processes that individuals engage in that influence personal insurance selection, which include backward-looking selection, adverse retention, and aging in place.

Backward-looking selection is explained as past experiences influencing the level of insurance acquired by an individual. For example, someone who became severely ill and did not have enough insurance coverage might seek out more insurance coverage, as a result of the previous experience.

Aging in place refers to someone remaining on the same plan for life because insurance provided is sufficient and the cost of switching is too high.

The study conducted analyses by creating models based on data from the Massachusetts state employee health insurance programs. The data was aggregated by HMO and FFS.

Based on the analyses and modeling, adverse selection and adverse retention were very small compared to the projected impact from premium increases for enrollees. In other words, as premiums increase, enrollment in FFS dramatically decreased. That finding was also demonstrated in a literature review published by the RAND corporation.

Although there is little difference in terms of selection effects between HMOs and FFS since the enrollee pays a small portion of marginal costs, Cutler contends that adverse selection (less-healthy individuals moving from more restrictive HMO to less-restrictive and more-costly FFS plans) has a greater impact than adverse retention on enrollees' choice of health plans.

In summary, movement from adverse selection and adverse retention is minimal, but it is highly correlated and concentrated in the older and less healthy population, favoring HMO plans by their lower premiums and economic stability. Overall, adverse selection and retention are not critical factors in adjusting risk for health care plans, but demographics such as sex and age seem to be significant in spending patterns and differences in plan choices.

The article explored the trends and rationale behind the shift from FFS to HMO. In terms of overall quality of care provided, based on the type of health insurance, current literature suggest that the quality of care does not differ between HMO and FFS plans.

The article is timely in that it is relevant to the overall shift towards managed care in an effort to reduce health care costs, without reducing quality of care. In addition, it is relevant to the current discussions concerning the possibility of having competitive choice health insurance plans based upon risk adjustments.

== See also ==
- Fee-for-service
- Health maintenance organization
- Journal of Health Economics
- RAND Corporation
