= Christopher S. Carpenter =

American economist

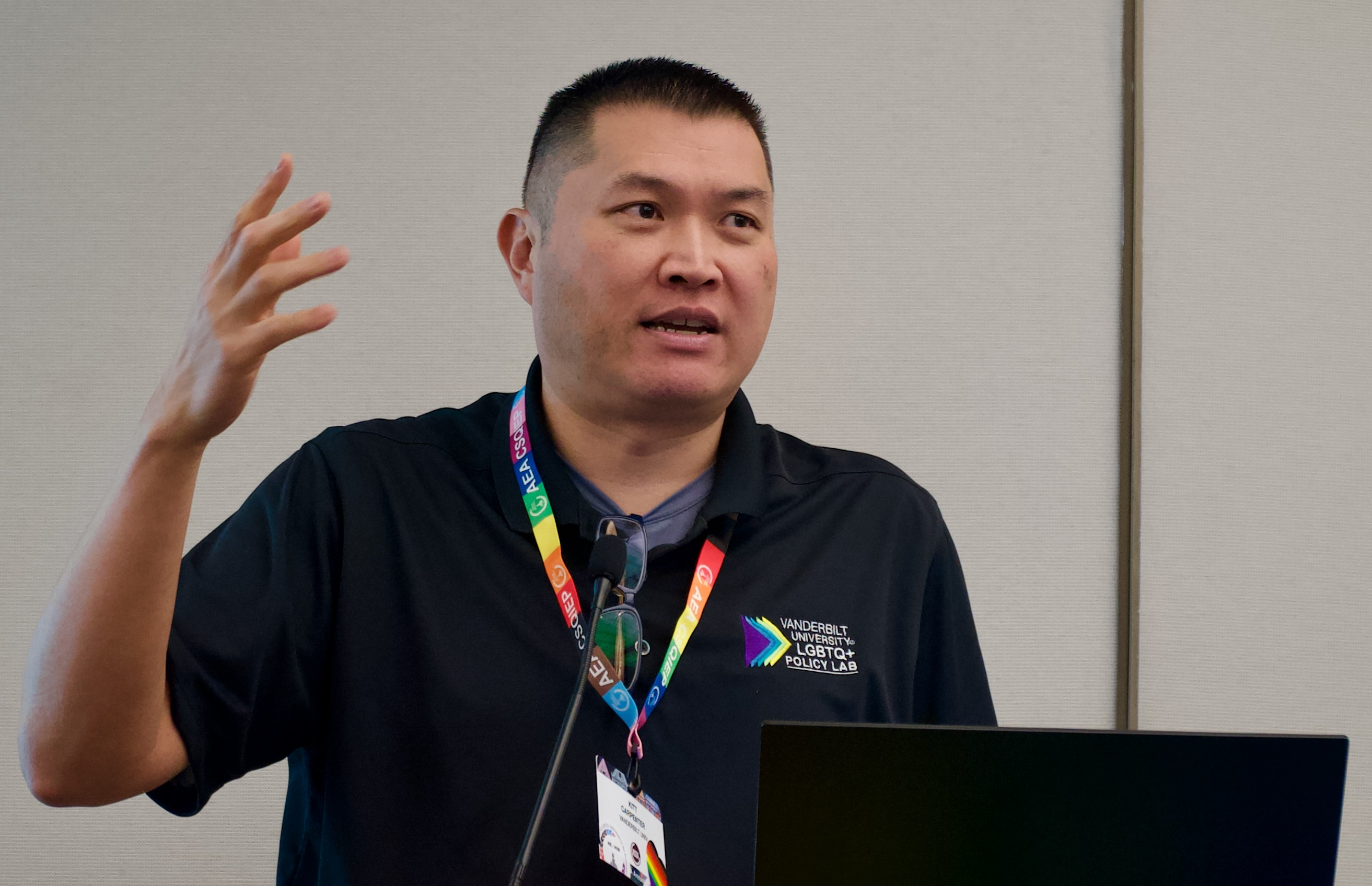

Christopher S. "Kitt" Carpenter is an American economist who is E. Bronson Ingram Chair and Professor of Economics at Vanderbilt University, founder and director of the Vanderbilt LGBT Policy Lab and director of the Vanderbilt Program in Public Policy Studies. He is also director of the National Bureau of Economic Research Health Economics program, editor of the Journal of Health Economics, president-elect of the Association for Public Policy Analysis and Management, and co-founder and co-chair of the American Economic Association Committee on the Status of LGBTQ+ Individuals in the Economics Profession.

In 2023, he was the first recipient of the Distinguished Service Award from the American Economic Association, awarded "for his selfless and persistent efforts to foster a welcoming environment for all economists and others aspiring to join our ranks."

== Education and early life ==
Carpenter is "a first-generation college graduate, a Korean adoptee, and a gay person." He graduated from Albion College in 1997 with a degree in economics, math, and public service and completed a doctorate in economics at the University of California at Berkeley in 2002.

== Career ==
Carpenter was a Robert Wood Johnson Foundation Postdoctoral Scholar in Health Policy Research from 2002 to 2004, when he joined the faculty of the Paul Merage School of Business at the University of California at Irvine. In 2013, he became a professor of economics at Vanderbilt University.

=== Research ===
Much of Carpenter's research focuses on the intersection of public policies (such as underage drunk driving laws, minimum drinking ages, and alcohol sales restrictions) with health behaviors, such as alcohol consumption and seat-belt usage. He has also written extensively on economic disparities by sexual orientation and on the economic impact of legal same-sex marriage.

==== Selected works ====
- Davis, Brennan, and Christopher Carpenter. "Proximity of fast-food restaurants to schools and adolescent obesity." American journal of public health 99, no. 3 (2009): 505–510.
- Carpenter, Christopher, and Carlos Dobkin. "The effect of alcohol consumption on mortality: regression discontinuity evidence from the minimum drinking age." American Economic Journal: Applied Economics 1, no. 1 (2009): 164–182.
- Carpenter, Christopher, and Philip J. Cook. "Cigarette taxes and youth smoking: new evidence from national, state, and local Youth Risk Behavior Surveys." Journal of health economics 27, no. 2 (2008): 287–299.
- Carpenter, Christopher S. "Self-reported sexual orientation and earnings: Evidence from California." ILR Review 58, no. 2 (2005): 258–273.
- Carpenter, Christopher, and Carlos Dobkin. "The minimum legal drinking age and public health." Journal of Economic Perspectives 25, no. 2 (2011): 133–156.
