= Marcella Alsan =

Medical scientist and economist

- Education: Harvard University (BA, MPH, PhD); Loyola University Chicago (MD)
- Known for: Researching health inequality
- Awards: 2021, MacArthur Fellowship
- Scientific career
- Institutions: Stanford University (2025-present), Harvard Kennedy School (2019-2025)
- Thesis: Infectious Disease and Development
- Doctoral advisor: David Cutler, Nathan Nunn, Michael Kremer, Paul Farmer
- Website: economics.stanford.edu/people/marcella-alsan healthinequalitylab.org

Marcella Alsan is an American physician and economist at Stanford University. She is known for her works in the field of health inequality and development economics. She is currently the Annie and Ned Lamont Professor of International Studies at Stanford University. She was previously a professor of Public Policy at the Harvard Kennedy School and an associate professor of medicine at Stanford University. Alsan was awarded a MacArthur Fellowship in 2021.

== Education ==
Alsan received a BA in cognitive neuroscience from Harvard University, magna cum laude, a master's in public health from the Harvard School of Public Health, an MD from Loyola University magna cum laude, and a Ph.D. in economics from Harvard University. Alsan also trained with the Global Health Equity Residency in Internal Medicine at the Brigham and Women's Hospital and the Fellowship in Infectious Diseases at Partners with BWH and Massachusetts General Hospital.

== Career ==
Alsan's article, "Tuskegee and the Health of Black Men", with Marianne Wanamaker, found that life expectancy for black men at age 45 fell by 1.5 years following the disclosure of the Tuskegee study in 1972. It accounts for approximately 35% of the variance in the 1980 gap in the life expectancies between black and white men. Her work on the effects of physician workforce diversity in Oakland found that African-American subjects are much more likely to select every preventative health service when meeting a racially concordant doctor. Alsan's research on the effects of the tsetse fly on African development showed that ethnic groups living in areas with the TseTse are still affected economically due to its effects on precolonial political centralization.

Alsan's research spans the political economy of health policy as well as the economics of health inequality. In a paper in the Quarterly Journal of Economics, Alsan and Neberai examine why the United States never adopted national health insurance, discussing that the American Medical Association played a role in blocking its passage through the twentieth century.

She also has significant publications in the areas of antimicrobial resistance and out of pocket health expenditures, infant mortality, and population health and foreign direct investment.

Alsan is the co-director of the Health Care Delivery Initiative of J-PAL North America. In her role, she has studied through evaluations the impact of messaging and incentives to increase survey response rates to identify barriers to COVID-19 testing in the US, with Banerjee and Duflo. She has also studied the effects of diversity in COVID-19 communications on health outcomes, and the effects on messages on COVID-19 prevention on preventative behaviours in India. Alsan has conducted additional research on COVID-19 behaviours and knowledge related disparities.

Alsan was on the Social Science advisory board for Science, was an editor for the Journal of Health Economics, and is a research associate at the National Bureau of Economic Research. She is currently an associate editor at the Quarterly Journal of Economics and Journal of Economic Literature. She also currently serves as the International Health Economics Association's (IHEA) Director for Northern America.

Alsan was awarded a MacArthur Genius Grant in 2021. She has also won several awards for best health economics paper, including the Arrow Award for Best Paper in Health Economics, awarded by the IHEA, and the Willard G. Manning Memorial Award for the Best Research in Health Econometrics, awarded by the American Society of Health Economists (ASHEcon). She is a two-time recipient of the Arrow Award, awarded for "Tuskegee and the Health of Black Men" (co-authored with Marianne Wanamaker, published in the Quarterly Journal of Economics) and for "Representation and Extrapolation: Evidence from Clinical Trials" (co-authored with Maya Durvasula, Harsh Gupta, Joshua Schwartzstein, and Heidi Williams, published in the Quarterly Journal of Economics); and a recipient of the Manning Award for "Does Diversity Matter for Health? Experimental Evidence from Oakland" (published in the American Economic Review). In 2024, Alsan was awarded the Humboldt Research Award by the Alexander von Humboldt Foundation, an international prize given to up to 100 leading academics worldwide each year, in recognition of their career-long research achievements, becoming the first serving Harvard Kennedy School professor to receive the honor since 2002. In 2025, Alsan was named to STAT's STATUS List, an annual list recognizing 50 influential people shaping the future of health and life sciences.
