= Ilyana Kuziemko =

Economist

- Born: March 5, 1978 (age 48)

Academic background
- Education: Harvard University (AB, PhD); University of Oxford (BA)

Academic work
- Discipline: Public finance Labor economics
- Institutions: Princeton University; Columbia University
- Website: kuziemko.scholar.princeton.edu

Ilyana Kuziemko is an economist and the Theodore A. Wells '29 Professor of Economics at Princeton University. Her research focuses on public finance, political economy, labor economics, and economic inequality.

== Education and career ==
Kuziemko received an A.B. in economics from Harvard University in 2000, graduating summa cum laude. After being selected as a Rhodes Scholar, she studied mathematics at the University of Oxford, receiving a B.A. in 2002. She completed a Ph.D. in economics at Harvard in 2007.

She joined the faculty of Princeton University in 2007. From 2009 to 2010, she served as Deputy Assistant Secretary for Economic Policy at the United States Department of the Treasury, where she worked on the development and early implementation of the Affordable Care Act. She taught at Columbia Business School from 2012 to 2014 before returning to Princeton in 2014.

Kuziemko is also a research associate at the National Bureau of Economic Research.

== Research ==
=== Research on voter preferences regarding redistributive policies ===
Support for Redistribution in an Age of Rising Inequality: New Stylized Facts and Some Tentative Explanations (2016)

To determine the changes in level of support for redistribution in the U.S., Ilyana Kuziemko, Vivekinan Ashok, and Ebonya Washington analyze American survey data over several decades. Although economic inequality in the U.S. has been increasing since 1970, the study finds that the support for redistribution has remained flat, and has decreased significantly for the elderly and for African-Americans. Possible explanations for this trend are explored, and the authors argue that the elderly have grown less supportive of redistribution due to worries that it would come at their expense through cuts to Medicare. The authors also argue that African-American attitudes surrounding fairness in economic issues have increased, explaining the decline in support for redistribution.

How Elastic Are Preferences for Redistribution? Evidence from Randomized Survey Experiments (2015)

Ilyana Kuziemko, Michael I. Norton, Emmanuel Saez, and Stefanie Stantcheva use randomized online surveys on Amazon Mechanical Turk (mTurk) to analyze the effects of information regarding income inequality and taxes on preferences for redistribution. Randomized treatments were provided to approximately 4,000 respondents with varying information on income inequality in the U.S., the estate tax, and the relationship between tax rates on the highest income group and economic growth. The authors find that the treatment has substantial effects on views about the significance of inequality as a problem. Conversely, the treatment has limited effects on preferences surrounding redistributive policies. Lastly, the authors observe that treatments informing respondents that the estate tax only affects very wealthy families have a large positive effect on support for the estate tax.

=== Research on the implications of U.S. public health insurance programs on vulnerable groups ===
Does Managed Care Widen Infant Health Disparities? Evidence from Texas Medicaid (2017)

In this study, the effects of the transition from fee-for-service (FFS) programs to managed care plans on the disparities in infant health outcomes are analyzed. Ilyana Kuziemko, Katherine Meckel, and Maya Rossin-Slater find that mortality rates and pre-term birth rates increase for black infants, by 15 percent and 7 percent, respectively, and decrease for Hispanic infants by 22 percent and 7 percent, respectively, under private Medicaid Managed Care (MMC) plans.

The Demand for Health Insurance Among Uninsured Americans: Results of a Survey Experiment and Implications for Policy (2013)

To assess the willingness of uninsured Americans to pay for a health insurance plan. Alan B. Krueger and Ilyana Kuziemko conduct a survey experiment on approximately 1,000 individuals through a Gallup-Healthways Daily Poll. The authors observe a higher price elasticity than previously found in other studies. Among the respondents who reported being uninsured, 60 percent would purchase insurance if offered a $2,000 annual premium. Krueger and Kuziemko argue that these results suggest that under the provisions of the Affordable Care Act, an estimate of 35 million uninsured individuals are projected to gain coverage. Furthermore, the authors argue that the results of the study show that the effects of such policies in increasing coverage rates have been greatly underestimates in previous studies.

=== Research on the U.S. criminal justice system ===
How Should Inmates Be Released From Prison? An Assessment of Parole Versus Fixed Sentence Regimes (2013)

To study how parole and fixed sentencing affect recidivism rates, Kuziemko analyzes data from the Georgia Department of Corrections over several decades. The study finds that parole boards efficiently set prison time based on a prisoner's recidivism risk, thus reducing recidivism within three years of release by 1.3 percentage points. Furthermore, the findings indicate that the "90% policy" – where prisoners are required to complete at least 90% of their original sentence without the possibility of parole – reduces the inmates' incentives to rehabilitate, resulting in an increase in recidivism rates.

== Honors ==
Kuziemko was a Rhodes Scholar from 2000 to 2002 and was selected for the Review of Economic Studies Tour in 2007. She received a Sloan Research Fellowship in 2014 and was elected a Fellow of the Econometric Society in 2022.
