= Navin Kartik =

Academic background
- Education: Stanford University (Ph.D.); Brandeis University (B.A.)
- Doctoral advisors: B. Douglas Bernheim Steven Tadelis

Academic work
- Discipline: Political economy Microeconomics Information economics
- Institutions: Yale University
- Doctoral students: Petra Persson
- Awards: Sloan Research Fellowship (2010)
- Website: Information at IDEAS / RePEc

Navin Kartik is an American economist. He is a professor of economics at Yale University.

== Biography ==
Kartik received his B.A. from Brandeis University and Ph.D. from Stanford University. He was a member of the Institute for Advanced Study from 2007 to 2008. He taught at University of California, San Diego from 2004 to 2009 before joining the Columbia faculty. He left Columbia in 2025 to join Yale University. His research has focused on applied game theory and political economy.

Kartik was elected a fellow of the Econometric Society in 2022. He was also a recipient of a Sloan Research Fellowship in 2010. In 2023 he became Editor of the American Economic Journal: Microeconomics; he also received the Lenfest Distinguished Faculty award at Columbia.
