= W. Bentley MacLeod =

Canadian-American economist

- Born: 1954 (age 71–72)

Academic background
- Education: Queen's University, University of British Columbia

Academic work
- Discipline: Law and economics, Labor economics, Health Economics
- Institutions: Columbia University, Yale University
- Website: Information at IDEAS / RePEc

William Bentley MacLeod (born 1954) is a Canadian-American economist. He is Visiting Professor and Senior Research Scientist at Yale University and the Sami Mnaymneh Professor of Economics and Professor of International and Public Affairs Emeritus at Columbia University. He is a specialist in the fields of labor economics and organizational economics, and law and economics.

== Education ==
MacLeod received a B.A. with distinction in Mathematics from Queen's University in 1975 and an M.Sc. in Mathematics from Queen's University in 1979. He completed his economics doctorate at the University of British Columbia in 1984.

== Academic career ==
He began his teaching career at Queen's University, then he taught at Université de Montréal, Boston College, University of Southern California, California Institute of Technology and Princeton University, before coming to Columbia University. He has also held one year visiting positions at Center for Operations Research and Econometrics(Belgium), Instituto de Análisis Económico (Barcelona), Princeton University, the Russell Sage Foundation and the Institute for Advanced Study.

He was elected fellow of the Econometric Society in 2005, and fellow of the Society of Labor Economists in 2012. He is also the recipient of the 2002 H. Gregg Lewis prize awarded by the Society of Labor Economists for his article "Worker Cooperation and the Ratchet" with H. Lorne Carmichael. He is a Past President of the Society of Institutional and Organizational Economics in 2017–18, and the American Law and Economics Association in 2021. Research Associate at the NBER, and member of the working groups on Labor Economics, Law and Economics and Health Economics.

== Notable publications ==
- "Advanced microeconomics for contract, institutional, and organizational economics", MIT Press,
- "Implicit Contracts, Incentive Compatibility, and Involuntary Unemployment" by MacLeod and Malcomson
- MacLeod, W. Bentley, and James M. Malcomson. "Investments, Holdup, and the Form of Market Contracts." The American Economic Review 83, no. 4 (1993): 811–37, https://www.jstor.org/stable/2117580
- MacLeod, W. Bentley. "Reputations, Relationships, and Contract Enforcement." Journal of Economic Literature 45, no. 3 (2007): 595–628. www.jstor.org/stable/27646841.
- "First Do No Harm? Tort Reform and Birth Outcomes" mentioned in Tort Reform.
- "Optimal Contracting with Subjective Evaluation," American Economic Review: Vol. 93 No. 1 (March 2003).
- "Performance Pay and Wage Inequality", Quarterly Journal of Economics, 2009, Vol. 124, Issue 1 (joint with T. Lemieux and D. Parent)
- "Administrative Corruption and Taxation", by Frank Flatters and W. Bentley Macleod. Reprinted in "The Economics Of Corruption And Illegal Markets".

== Personal life ==
MacLeod is married to Janet Currie, an economist at Yale University. They have two children.
