= James M. Malcomson =

British-Irish economist

James Malcomson is a British-Irish economist. He is an emeritus Professor of Economics at the University of Oxford and emeritus Fellow of All Souls College. He is a specialist in the fields of labour economics and contract theory.

== Education ==
Following graduation with a BA in economics at Gonville and Caius College, Cambridge, in 1967, Malcomson studied for a doctorate in economics at Harvard University, which he completed in 1973 with a thesis supervised by the Nobel laureate Wassily Leontief.

== Career ==
Malcomson was a lecturer, then senior lecturer, at the University of York (1972–85), Professor of Economics at the University of Southampton (1985–1999) and then statutory Professor of Economics at the University of Oxford and Fellow of All Souls College (1999–2013). He was elected Fellow of the British Academy in 2000 and Fellow of the Econometric Society in 2005. He chaired the Office of Health Economics Commission on Competition in the NHS, 2011–2012 and served as a member of the Review Body on Doctors' and Dentists' Remuneration, 2015–2021.

== Research ==
Malcomson's early research analysed vintage effects in investment, especially the implications for obsolescence, replacement and utilisation of capital equipment and the effects of tax policy on these. He derived rigorous theoretical models of optimal investment and replacement that do not rely on stationarity (1), showed how optimal policies relate to simple rules, and derived analytic results for the effects of changes in tax policy on investment and replacement (3). He also devised ways to estimate such models empirically without imposing stationarity, an essential step in predicting the short-run effects of tax policy changes (2). He additionally explored dynamic inconsistency in government policies (6), the Laffer Curve (7), and the impact of trade unions (9).

Malcomson's empirical research on production convinced him of the need for economists to understand better the labour side of the production process and much of his more recent research has been directed towards that. One of his main concerns has been with different ways of motivating employees when important aspects of performance are not easily specified in an employment contract and their implications: high pay coupled with the threat of dismissal for unsatisfactory performance (efficiency wages) (4), competition for promotion (5), tournaments (8) and repeated interaction over time (10), which "showed that the optimal long-term contract can be replicated by a sequence of optimal static contracts when the agent's saving decision can be controlled by the principal." With W. Bentley MacLeod, he characterized the full set of outcomes that can be sustained in such repeated principal-agent contexts (12), described as "the "classic" relational contract model" and "(t)he most complete analysis of relational contracts under symmetric information". Together they also showed in (11) that tournaments and competition for promotion can provide effective methods of motivation provided agent-employees are sufficiently heterogeneous in their abilities, a system that "mimics a remarkable number of the features of actual job ladders in internal labor markets". Performance-related bonuses are effective even when agent-employees are homogeneous but may result in less efficient outcomes than efficiency wages when prospective employees are plentiful relative to jobs (18). But when employees differ in abilities, competition for promotion may be open to influence activities and so distort allocation of employees to more senior jobs (21) and efficient outcomes in the future prevent full separation of abilities when differences are sufficiently fine (26) in which "Malcomson provides a general analysis of relational contracts with persistent private information. He shows that full revelation of information is inconsistent with continuation payoffs being on the Pareto frontier, and therefore it generalizes the observation that asymmetric information leads to conflict in relational contracts." This approach has been taken up in the subsequent literature. These results have implications for dual economies (18) and cyclical behavior (14), in which the "interplay between competition and relational contracts also has implications for output over the business cycle". The implications for labour markets are surveyed in (15) and, more completely, in (19) and those for economic organizations in (25).

Other research with W. Bentley MacLeod has shown that the types of contracts used in many practical situations have properties that theory suggests are appropriate for protecting investments in general and specific assets (13). Research with other co-authors has shown how time-serving apprenticeships can mitigate incentive issues in training (22) and the role for not-for-profit providers in provision of public sector services (27). Malcomson also analysed forms of contract appropriate for the provision of health services (23), (24) and, most notably, the quality of care (16) and (17), developments surveyed in (20).

== Selected publications ==
(1) Malcomson, James M. (February 1975). "Replacement and the rental value of capital equipment subject to obsolescence". Journal of Economic Theory. 10 (1): 24–41. doi:10.1016/0022-0531(75)90059-9.

(2) Malcomson, James M.; Prior, Michael J. (October 1979). "The estimation of a vintage model of production for U.K. manufacturing". Review of Economic Studies. 46 (4): 719–736. doi:10.2307/2297038. JSTOR 2297038.

(3) "Corporate tax policy and the service life of capital equipment", Review of Economic Studies, 48(2), April 1981, 311–316. Print ISSN 0034-6527 Online ISSN 1467-937X https://doi.org/10.2307/2296887

(4) "Unemployment and the efficiency wage hypothesis", Economic Journal, 91(364), December 1981, 848–866. Print ISSN 0013-0133 Online ISSN 1468-029 https://doi.org/10.2307/2232496

(5) "Work incentives, hierarchy, and internal labor markets", Journal of Political Economy, 92(3), June 1984, 486–507. Print ISSN 0022-3808 E-ISSN 1537-534X JSTOR 1837229. Reprinted in George A. Akerlof and Janet L. Yellen (eds.), Efficiency Wage Models of the Labor Market (Cambridge University Press, Cambridge, 1986), 157–178. ISBN 978-0-521-32156-3 EISBN 978-0-511-55959-4 doi:10.1017/CBO9780511559594.011

(6) "Dynamic inconsistency, rational expectations, and optimal government policy" (with Brian Hillier), Econometrica, 52(6), November 1984, 1437–1451. Print ISSN 0012-9682 Online ISSN 1468-0262 doi:10.2307/1913514

(7) "Some analytics of the Laffer curve", Journal of Public Economics, 29(3), April 1986, 263–279. Print ISSN 0047-2727 Online ISSN 1879-2316 doi:10.1016/0047-2727(86)90029-0

(8) "Rank-order contracts for a principal with many agents", Review of Economic Studies, 53(5), October 1986, 807–817. Print ISSN 0034-6527 Online ISSN 1467-937X doi:10.2307/2297720

(9) "Tax push inflation in a unionized labour market" (with Nicola Sartor), European Economic Review, 31(8), December 1987, 1581–1596. Print ISSN 0014-2921 Online ISSN 1873-572X doi:10.1016/S0014-2921(87)80027-2

(10) "The multiperiod principal-agent problem" (with Frans Spinnewyn), Review of Economic Studies, 55(3), July 1988, 391–407. Print ISSN 0034-6527 Online ISSN 1467-937X doi:10.2307/2297391

(11) "Reputation and hierarchy in dynamic models of employment" (with W. Bentley MacLeod), Journal of Political Economy, 96(4), August 1988, 832–854. Print ISSN 0022-3808 E-ISSN 1537-534X JSTOR 1830476

(12) "Implicit contracts, incentive compatibility, and involuntary unemployment" (with W. Bentley MacLeod), Econometrica, 57(2), March 1989, 447–480. Print ISSN 0012-9682 Online ISSN 1468-0262 https://doi.org/10.2307/1912562. Reprinted in Patrick Bolton (ed.), The Economics of Contracts, vol. 2, chapter 12 (Edward Elgar, Cheltenham, 2008) ISBN 978-1-84064-416-6 https://www.e-elgar.com/shop/gbp/the-economics-of-contracts-9781840644166.html and in David Martimort (ed.), The Economic Theory of Incentives, vol. II, chapter 11 (Edward Elgar, Cheltenham, 2017) ISBN 978-1-78536-443-3 https://www.e-elgar.com/shop/gbp/the-economic-theory-of-incentives-9781785364433.html

(13) "Investments, holdup, and the form of market contracts" (with W. Bentley MacLeod), American Economic Review, 83(4), September 1993, 811–837. Print ISSN 0002-8282 Online ISSN 1944-7981 JSTOR 2117580

(14) "Labor turnover and the natural rate of unemployment: efficiency wage versus frictional unemployment" (with W. Bentley MacLeod and Paul Gomme), Journal of Labor Economics, 12(2), April 1994, 276–315. Print ISSN 0734-306X E-ISSN 1537-5307 JSTOR 2535277

(15) "Contracts, hold-up, and labor markets", Journal of Economic Literature, 35(4), December 1997, 1916–1957. Print ISSN 0022-0515 Online ISSN 2328-8175 JSTOR 2729883

(16) "Contracting for health services when patient demand does not reflect quality" (with Martin Chalkley), Journal of Health Economics, 17(1), January 1998, 1–19. Print ISSN 0167-6296 Online ISSN 1879-1646 doi:10.1016/S0167-6296(97)00019-2

(17) "Contracting for health services with unmonitored quality" (with Martin Chalkley), Economic Journal, 108(449), July 1998, 1093–1110. Print ISSN 0013-0133 Online ISSN 1468-0297 doi:10.1111/1468-0297.00331

(18) "Motivation and markets" (with W. Bentley MacLeod), American Economic Review, 88(3), June 1998, 388–411. Print ISSN 0002-8282 Online ISSN 1944-7981 JSTOR 116841

(19) "Individual employment contracts" in Orley Ashenfelter and David Card (eds.), Handbook of Labor Economics, vol. 3B (Elsevier Science, Amsterdam, 1999), chapter 35, 2291–2372. ISBN 978-0-444-50188-2 doi:10.1016/S1573-4463(99)30021-3

(20) "Government purchasing of health services" (with Martin Chalkley) in Anthony J. Culyer and Joseph P. Newhouse (eds.), Handbook of Health Economics, vol. 1A, chapter 15 (Elsevier Science, Amsterdam, 2000), 847–890. ISBN 978-0-444-50470-8 doi:10.1016/S1574-0064(00)80174-2

(21) "Performance, promotion, and the Peter Principle" (with James A. Fairburn), Review of Economic Studies, 68(1), January 2001, 45–66. Print ISSN 0034-6527 EISSN 1467-937X doi:10.1111/1467-937X.00159

(22) "General training by firms, apprentice contracts, and public policy" (with James W. Maw and Barry McCormick), European Economic Review, 47(2), April 2003, 197–227. Print ISSN 0014-2921 Online ISSN 1873-572X doi:10.1016/S0014-2921(02)00207-6. Reprinted in Francis Green (ed.), Recent Developments in the Economics of Training, vol. 1, chapter 6 (Edward Elgar, Cheltenham, 2007). ISBN 978 1 84542 546 3 https://www.e-elgar.com/shop/gbp/recent-developments-in-the-economics-of-training-9781845425463.html

(23) "Health service gatekeepers", RAND Journal of Economics, 35(2), Summer 2004, 401–421. Print ISSN 0741-6261 Online ISSN 1756-2171 JSTOR 1593698

(24) "Supplier discretion over provision: theory and an application to medical care", RAND Journal of Economics, 36(2), Summer 2005, 412–432. Print ISSN 0741-6261 Online ISSN 1756-2171 JSTOR 4135249

(25) "Relational incentive contracts" in Robert Gibbons and John Roberts (eds.), The Handbook of Organizational Economics (Princeton University Press, 2013), chapter 25, 1014–1065. ISBN 978-0-691-13279-2 doi:10.1515/9781400845354-027

(26) "Relational incentive contracts with persistent private information", Econometrica, 84(1), January 2016, 317–346. Print ISSN 0012-9682 Online ISSN 1468-0262 doi:10.3982/ECTA10946

(27) "Competition in public service provision: the role of not-for-profit providers" (with Timothy Besley), Journal of Public Economics, 162, June 2018, 158–172. Print ISSN 0047-2727 Online ISSN 1879-2316 doi:10.1016/j.jpubeco.2018.04.004

== Personal life ==
Malcomson is married to the social gerontologist Dr Sally Richards. They live in Oxford.
