= Gary Hoover (economist) =

Gary A. Hoover
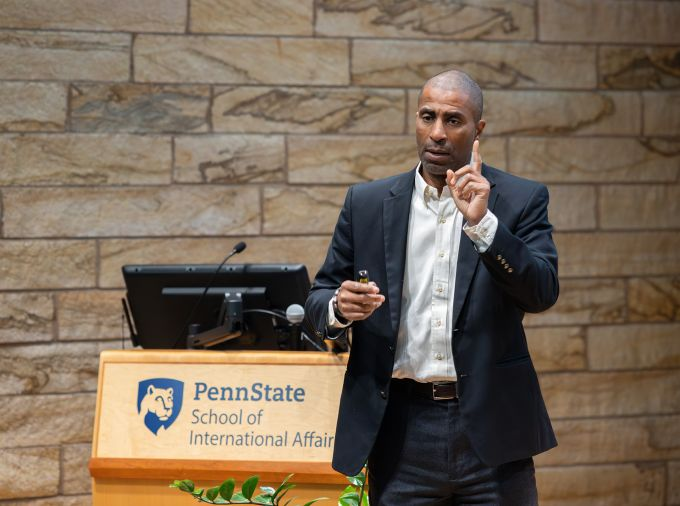
- Born: August 1968 (age 58); Milwaukee, Wisconsin

Academic background
- Education: University of Wisconsin-Milwaukee (BA); Washington University in St. Louis (PhD)
- Doctoral advisor: Marcus Berliant and Paul Rothstein

Academic work
- Discipline: Economic Inequality, Ethics in the Economics Profession
- Institutions: University of Alabama; University of Oklahoma; Tulane University
- Website: https://sites.google.com/site/garyhoovereconomics

Gary A. Hoover (born August 1968) is an American professor of economics and director of the Murphy Institute at Tulane University. Before joining Tulane University, he had taught at University of Oklahoma and University of Alabama.

He is the founding Editor-in-Chief of the Journal of Economics, Race, and Policy. He has published extensively on public policy, race, and inequality in the United States, and is a leading scholar on plagiarism and other types of misconduct in the economics profession.

== Education and early life ==
Hoover was born and raised in Milwaukee, Wisconsin. After attending Rufus King High School, he joined the Army in 1986 and was assigned to Fort Carson in Colorado. He used funding from the G.I. Bill to pay for his college education at the University of Wisconsin-Milwaukee. He completed a B.A. degree in economics in 1993, followed by M.A. and PhD degrees in economics from Washington University in St. Louis in 1995 and 1998.

== Career ==
In August 1998 he joined the Department of Economics, Finance and Legal Studies at the University of Alabama. He was the first and only African American ever hired in that department. He was tenured in August 2004 and in 2005 became the Assistant Dean for Graduate Student and Faculty Development in the Culverhouse College of Commerce while maintaining full teaching and research duties. He was granted full professor in August 2010. He was a William White McDonald Family Distinguished Faculty Fellow from 2006 - 2014.

He joined the University of Oklahoma as chair of the Department of Economics in January 2015 and was appointed a President's Associates Presidential Professor in 2017. He was the first and only African American ever hired in that department. In the same year, he became the founding editor of the Journal of Economics, Race and Policy. From 2018 until 2020 he was the vice president of the Southern Economic Association.

In January 2021, he became Professor of Economics and executive director of the Murphy Institute at Tulane University. From 2022 to 2023, he was the president of the Southern Economic Association. He served as the co-chair of the Committee on the Status of Minority Groups in the Economics Profession 2012 to 2024.

== Research ==
=== Poverty/Income Distribution Research ===
His earlier works dealt mostly with local government operations and efficiencies. He published works examining how different cities distributed liquor licenses based on demand side factors and how different cities benefited from labor cost savings by privatizing their refuse removal services. He would continue to do comparative economic research throughout his career. He published works examining whether student performance improved based on school officials being elected or appointed to their positions. He also examined whether state level tobacco taxes were set for reasons other than maximizing tax revenue and how states determined clear indoor air laws along with laws restricting youth from tobacco products.

In the early 2000s he began exploring the implications of public policy on poverty. This research explored the idea of whether economic growth was really associated with poverty reduction and whether robust economic growth would lead to robust reductions in poverty. The results seemed to be promising for those close to the poverty line but not those further away. His work on growth and poverty led him to examine whether there were racial aspects missing from the discussion and also whether measures of poverty which were distribution sensitive, such as the Sen Index, mattered.

His earlier works on growth and poverty led him to realize that the area could not be adequately addressed unless he expanded his analysis to examine the entire income distribution and also included discussions of race and ethnicity. He would go on to publish works which examined gender differences in income inequality among immigrants and how government income maintenance programs impacted racial and ethnic groups income inequality differently. Hoover would publish works on racial and ethnic differences in income inequality by region of the country and the impact of banking deregulation on racial income inequality. In 2011, he published research examining the link between Economic Freedom and growth. The paper showed a positive but tenuous relationship. He would later do research examining the distributional aspects of Economic Freedom which showed no statistical gains to the lower quintiles of the income distribution. He also examined whether Economic Freedom reduced or expanded the racial income gap. His research showed that the gap widened because the positive benefits were received by non-Black citizens while Black incomes were unaffected.

=== Plagiarism and Unethical Behavior Research ===
In June 2004, Hoover published an article outlining how he had been the victim of professional plagiarism of his previous works on growth and poverty. Hoover stated that the editor of the journal where he had submitted the work was unwilling to punish the plagiarist so he and his co-author did a survey of other journal editors to see if this sentiment was common. He stated that he was so shocked by the results and the thinking of editors regarding this issue that it became a field of study. Since then he has surveyed editors in other fields such as management, political science, and other social sciences. He has also surveyed rank-and-file professional economists along with rank-and-file professionals in management research. He is considered a leading expert in this area and often lectures other economics departments about the issue. He sits on the RePec plagiarism board. To date, he has published 7 peer-reviewed academic articles on the subject.

=== Ladder or Lottery? ===
In February 2026, Hoover published his award-winning book Ladder or Lottery: Economic Promises and the Reality of Who Gets Ahead. The work asked a simple question about placement on the social and economic scale, namely were people at lower or higher strata by their own choice or actions? Hoover argued that perspective seemed to matter greatly in the context of where one felt they were and should be along the economic and social spectrum. He stated that some felt the sorting out of positions along this spectrum had a very clear merit component, manifested by industry, sacrifice, and dedication, others viewed the final ordering as being much more opaque, where requested actions, once taken, did not seem to align with expected outcomes. He then referred to the actions and the resulting outcomes as being a social contract between society as a whole and the individuals who made it up.

In the end, he pointed out something that is touted in the fields of economics, science, and engineering, along with many others, about system design. If an individual designs a system, or in his words, a social contract, the same input must repeatedly and predictably produce the same output. If the same input cannot be counted on to give the same output, then there is a design flaw and some thought should be given to a redesign. He argued that at a minimum, the user should be made aware of the glitch in the system. Hoover felt that many in society were not willing to admit that there was a glitch in the system. They simply attributed the problem to the end users. He then stated that his economics and mathematics training had a problem with that logic. His argument was that there were approximately 45 million individuals at substantially lower rungs of the economic ladder, and that it was statistically inconceivable that so many were suffering from a culture or pathology that kept them from climbing the ladder. He stated that it was hard to fathom that some of those millions did not attempt to use the system as intended but did not get the desired result. If that was the case, then the economic system was not working as intended, and instead of a ladder, the economic system much more resembled a lottery.

=== Economics Profession and Race/Ethnicity ===
Hoover became co-chair of the Committee on the Status of Minority Groups in the Economics Profession (CSMGEP) in 2012. The CSMGEP has a website which lists minority job candidates in economics, publishes a yearly newsletter titled the Minority Report, and provides links and resources for making the economics profession more diverse. It also runs three programs to increase the representation of Blacks in the profession: a Summer Training Program, a Mentoring Program, and a Summer Economics Fellows Program. Yet, data compiled in CSMGEP's annual reports show that the percentage of PhD degrees in economics conferred to Blacks tends to hover around 2-3%, reaching a high of 3.9% in academic year 2017–8. Hoover has written and lectured extensively about the difficulties for African Americans in the economics profession. In October 2020, Hoover and fellow CSMGEP co-chair Ebonya Washington pushed the American Economic Association to implement 5 new programs on diversity including an undergraduate essay prize in honor of Andrew Brimmer, a travel grant for underrepresented minorities, and a seed grant for economics departments to start programs aimed at diversity and inclusion.
