= Jonathan Gruber (economist) =

American economist

Jon Gruber
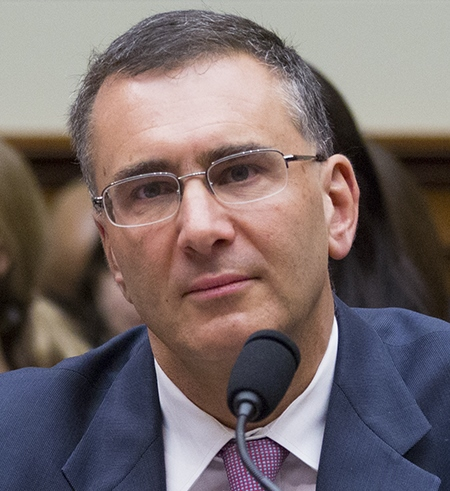
- Gruber in 2014
- Born: September 30, 1965 (age 61)

Academic background
- Education: Massachusetts Institute of Technology (BS); Harvard University (MA, PhD)
- Doctoral advisor: Lawrence F. Katz

Academic work
- Discipline: Health economics
- Institutions: Massachusetts Institute of Technology
- Doctoral students: Susan Dynarski; Amy Finkelstein; Jonah B. Gelbach; Melissa Kearney; Botond Kőszegi; Amanda Kowalski; Ebonya Washington
- Website: Information at IDEAS / RePEc

Jonathan Holmes Gruber (born September 30, 1965) is an American professor of economics at the Massachusetts Institute of Technology, where he has taught since 1992. He is also the director of the Health Care Program at the National Bureau of Economic Research, where he is a research associate. An associate editor of both the Journal of Public Economics and the Journal of Health Economics, Gruber has been heavily involved in crafting public health policy.

He has been described as a key architect of both the 2006 Massachusetts health care reform, sometimes referred to as "Romneycare", and the 2010 Patient Protection and Affordable Care Act, sometimes referred to as the "ACA" and "Obamacare". He became the focus of media and political controversy in late 2014 when videos surfaced in which he made controversial statements about the legislative process, marketing strategies, and public perception surrounding the passage of the ACA.

== Early life and education ==
Gruber was born on September 30, 1965, the son of Martin Jay Gruber and Ellie Gruber. His father is professor emeritus of finance at the New York University Stern School of Business, having taught there for more than 40 years. Jonathan Gruber was raised in the New York suburb of Ridgewood, New Jersey. He completed his BS in economics from the Massachusetts Institute of Technology in 1987 and his PhD in economics from Harvard University in 1992, with a thesis titled Changes in the Structure of Employer-Provided Health Insurance. He has 3 children, Rachel, Jack, and Ava Gruber.

== Academic research career ==
Gruber began his career as an assistant professor of economics at MIT in 1992. He is also a research associate at the National Bureau of Economic Research. Gruber's research has focused on public finance and health economics. He has published over 150 research articles and has had his hand in editing six research volumes. He has written Public Finance and Public Policy, Health Care Reform and Jump-Starting America: How Breakthrough Science Can Revived Economic Growth and the American Dream (with Simon Johnson). In 2006 he won the American Society of Health Economists Inaugural Medal for the best health economist in the nation aged 40 and under.

From 2003 to 2006, Gruber was an essential architect in Massachusetts' health reform effort and became an inaugural member of the Health Connector Board whose job was to oversee these efforts. Later, Gruber was involved in the creation of the Affordable Care Act and Patient Protection Act. He worked closely with the Obama administration and Congress as a technical consultant.

== Government work and consulting ==
During the 1997–98 academic year, Gruber was on leave as Deputy Assistant Secretary for Economic Policy at the United States Department of the Treasury.

=== Massachusetts health care reform ===
From 2003 to 2006 he was one of the architects of Massachusetts health care reform, also known as "Romneycare." In 2006 he became an inaugural member of the Health Connector Board, the main implementing body for that effort.

Gruber was ousted from the Massachusetts Health Connector in February 2015.

=== Patient Protection and Affordable Care Act ===
During the 2008 election he was a consultant to the Clinton, Edwards and Obama presidential campaigns.

From 2009 to 2010, Gruber served as a technical consultant to the Obama Administration and worked with both the administration and U.S. Congress to help craft the Patient Protection and Affordable Care Act, often referred to as the ACA or "Obamacare". The Act was signed into law in March 2010, and Gruber has been described as an "architect", "writer", and "consultant" of the legislation. He was widely interviewed and quoted during the legislation's roll-out.

=== Vermont health care reform ===
In 2010 and 2011, Gruber was involved in crafting and advocating for the Single-Payer and Unified Health System bill in Vermont, which passed in May 2011.

The bill established Green Mountain Care, which aimed to be the first-ever state-level single-payer health care system in the United States by the time it was to have kicked in fully in 2017. Green Mountain Care was cancelled in December 2014 by Governor Peter Shumlin saying its projected costs were becoming too high.

Jonathan Gruber was later sued by the state of Vermont for falsely claiming hours worked by his research assistant which he invoiced the state for. He denies the claims and settled out of court forfeiting almost $100,000.

== Writing ==
Gruber has published more than 140 research articles (the majority of which were for NBER) and has edited six research volumes.

He is a co-editor of the Journal of Public Economics, an associate editor of the Journal of Health Economics, and the author of Public Finance and Public Policy. In 2011, he wrote Health Care Reform: What It Is, Why It's Necessary, How It Works, delineating the Affordable Care Act, and illustrated by Nathan Schreiber.

Gruber's published works include:

- In 1999, the Quarterly Journal of Economics published "Abortion legalization and child living circumstances: who is the 'marginal child'?" which suggests that the legalized abortion has a selective effect for reducing the birth of "marginal children" that saved the government over $14 billion in welfare payments through 1994.
- Writing for the National Bureau of Economic Research in 2002, Gruber worked together with Sendhil Mullainathan on a paper titled "Do Cigarette Taxes Make Smokers Happier", which did find an improvement in smokers' psychological state because higher taxes were a disincentive to smoking.
- On February 15, 2006, the Center on Budget and Policy Priorities published an article by Gruber entitled "The Cost and Coverage Impact of the President's Health Insurance Budget Proposals"
- In a December 4, 2008 editorial in The New York Times, "Medicine for the Job Market", he claimed that expanding health insurance, even in difficult financial times, would stimulate the economy.
- In an article for the National Institute for Health Care Management Foundation in April 2010, "Taxing Sin to Modify Behavior and Raise Revenue", Gruber advocated a sort of "sin tax" for the obese. He uses the model of cigarette taxes.
- On February 9, 2011, the Center for American Progress published an article by Gruber titled "Health Care Reform Without the Individual Mandate", analyzing the health insurance coverage impacts of alternative policy options for encouraging purchase of health insurance under the Patient Protection and Affordable Care Act, including the mandate, a late penalty, and automatic enrollment.

== Awards ==
In 2006, Gruber received the American Society of Health Economists Inaugural Medal for the best health economist in the nation aged 40 and under. He was elected a member of the Institute of Medicine in 2005. Gruber served on the executive committee of the American Economic Association from 2010 to 2012.

In 2011 he was named "One of the Top 25 Most Innovative and Practical Thinkers of Our Time" by Slate Magazine. In both 2006 and 2012 he was rated as one of the top 100 most powerful people in health care in the United States by Modern Healthcare Magazine.

== Controversies ==
=== Non-disclosure of HHS contract ===
In January 2010, after news emerged that Gruber was under a $297,000 contract with the U.S. Department of Health and Human Services, while at the same time promoting the Obama administration's health care reform policies, some commentators suggested a conflict of interest. Paul Krugman in The New York Times argued that, although Gruber didn't always disclose his HHS connections, the times when he didn't were no big deal. In response to Krugman's contention, Salon's Glenn Greenwald wrote, "What will make it impossible to effectively call out wrongdoing by future corrupt administrations (by which Krugman seems to mean: Republican administrations) is the willingness of some people to tolerate and defend corruption when done by 'their side.'"

=== Description of ACA subsidies ===
One heavily scrutinized part of the ACA reads that subsidies should be given to healthcare recipients who are enrolled "through an Exchange established by the State". Some have read this to mean that subsidies can be given only in states that have chosen to create their own healthcare exchanges, and do not use the federal exchange, while the Obama administration says that the wording applies to all states. This dispute was part of a series of lawsuits referred to collectively as King v. Burwell. In July 2014, two separate recordings of Gruber, both from January 2012, surfaced in which he seemed to contradict the administration's position. In one, Gruber states, in response to an audience question, that "if you're a state and you don't set up an exchange, that means your citizens don't get their tax credits", while in the other he says, "if your governor doesn't set up an exchange, you're losing hundreds of millions of dollars of tax credits to be delivered to your citizens". When these recordings emerged, Gruber called these statements mistaken, describing them as "just a speak-o—you know, like a typo".

=== "Grubergate" videos controversy ===
In November 2014, a series of videos emerged of Gruber speaking about the ACA at different events, from 2010 to 2013, in ways that proved to be controversial; the controversy became known in the press as "Grubergate". In the first, most widely publicized video, taken at a panel discussion about the ACA at the University of Pennsylvania in October 2013, Gruber said the bill was deliberately written "in a tortured way" to disguise the fact that it creates a system by which "healthy people pay in and sick people get money". He said this obfuscation was needed due to "the stupidity of the American voter" in ensuring the bill's passage. Gruber said the bill's inherent "lack of transparency is a huge political advantage" in selling it. The comments caused significant controversy. As a result, a contract he had with the office of the Auditor of North Carolina to assist in auditing a Medicaid program was terminated.

In two subsequent videos, Gruber was shown talking about the decision (which he attributed to John Kerry) to have the bill tax insurance companies instead of patients (the so-called "Cadillac tax"), which he called fundamentally the same thing economically but more palatable politically. In one video, he stated that "the American people are too stupid to understand the difference" between the two approaches, while in the other he said that the switch worked due to "the lack of economic understanding of the American voter".

In another video, taken in 2010, Gruber expressed doubts that the ACA would significantly reduce health care costs, although he noted that lowering costs played a major part in the way the legislation had been promoted. In another video, taken in 2011, Gruber again talks about manipulation behind the "Cadillac tax", this time also stating that the tax is designed so that, though it begins by affecting only 8% of insurance plans, it will "over the next 20 years" come to apply to nearly all employer-provided health plans. Journalist Jake Tapper noted that Gruber's description of the "Cadillac tax" directly contradicted a promise that Obama had made before the bill was passed.

After the first of these videos came out, Gruber apologized and conceded he "spoke inappropriately".

Some defenders of the ACA, such as Jonathan Cohn, called Gruber's statements about Americans "wrong and inappropriate" while maintaining that the trickery of which Gruber spoke was standard procedure in passing legislation in Washington, D.C., and thus not a cause for scandal. Opponents of the Act, on the other hand, were harsher in their criticism: National Review Online editor and conservative commentator Rich Lowry said the videos were emblematic of "the progressive mind, which values complexity over simplicity, favors indirect taxes and impositions on the American public so their costs can be hidden, and has a dim view of the average American", while commentator Charles Krauthammer called the first video "the ultimate vindication of the charge that Obamacare was sold on a pack of lies."

Conservative S.E. Cupp wrote that the videos showed "willful ignorance" on Gruber's part in thinking that the Act was successfully marketed to voters, stating that "the law has never cracked a 51% favorability rating" and that, in the first elections after the ACA passed, Republicans, who had opposed it, retook the House of Representatives and gained control of 11 additional state governorships.

Nancy Pelosi, then-Speaker of the House, who successfully shepherded the legislation through the House of Representatives, without a single GOP vote and despite some opposition from pro-life Democrats, stated in a press conference after the Gruber controversy, "So I don't know who he is. He didn't help write our bill", a comment PolitiFact described as "inaccurate".

==== Congressional hearing ====
In the wake of the controversy, Jonathan Gruber was called to testify before members of United States Congress. He gave testimony on December 9, 2014, in which he apologized for his remarks, which he called "glib, thoughtless, and sometimes downright insulting". The Wall Street Journal, in an editorial, called Gruber's apology unpersuasive, saying that "his response to substantive questions suggested that he is mainly sorry for getting caught on tape".

==== Effect on Vermont single-payer plan ====
On December 17, 2014, Vermont Governor Peter Shumlin cancelled the Vermont health care reform plan, on which Gruber had served as a consultant. Although budgetary concerns were cited as the reason for the cancellation, some called Gruber's involvement with the plan a factor as well.

According to VPR, Vermont state auditor Doug Hoffer is auditing Gruber's contracts for Vermont health care reform, which Gruber "helped Vermont design".

=== Extent of contributions ===
The extent of Gruber's contributions to both Massachusetts and federal health care reform has been the source of significant controversy. In 2014, the Obama administration claimed that Gruber did not have a major role in creating the ACA.

According to emails released by the U.S. House Oversight Committee to The Wall Street Journal, Gruber met and consulted with various Obama administration officials in charge of writing and developing the law, including Peter Orszag, who was director of the Office of Management and Budget (OMB), Jason Furman, an economic adviser to the president, Ezekiel Emanuel, who was then a special adviser for health policy at OMB, Jeanne Lambrew, a top Obama administration health adviser who worked at HHS and the White House, and Lawrence Summers, then a top economic adviser in the administration. In July 2009, he was invited to meet personally with Obama.

During his December 2014 congressional hearing, in both his written and oral testimony, Gruber downplayed his own influence on the Massachusetts and national health care plans, stating: "I did not draft Governor Romney's health care plan, and I was not the 'architect' of President Obama's health care plan." The newspaper The Hill called this a contradiction of various statements that Gruber had previously made, claiming that at "numerous speeches, lectures and TV interviews in the past four years, Gruber has been introduced as the 'architect' of the Massachusetts law and/or Obamacare".
