= William Oakland =

American economist

William Horace Oakland (February 21, 1939 – September 17, 2007) was an American Economist and Economics Professor at Tulane University. Born in Chicopee, Massachusetts, Oakland received his BA in economics from the University of Massachusetts in 1961 and Ph.D. in Industrial Economics from the Massachusetts Institute of Technology in 1965.

In addition to being a professor at Tulane University, Oakland served as the Chair of the Economics Department from 1981 to 1987 and from 1992 to 1998, Director of the Murphy Institute of Political Economy from 1980 to 1981, and Director of the Center of Public Policy Studies from 1998 to 2003. Oakland retired from Tulane University in 2003 and died on September 17, 2007.

Prior to teaching at Tulane University, Oakland was the assistant professor of political economy for Johns Hopkins University from 1964 to 1970, associate professor of political economy for Johns Hopkins University from 1970 to 1973, and professor of economics and public administration for Ohio State University from 1973 to 1979.

Oakland contributed to public economics. He authored or co-authored over 40 scientific publications in economic periodicals. Much of Oakland's work focuses on a few key issues such as taxation, public goods, and welfare.

== Public Goods, Perfect Competition, and Underproduction ==
A prominent paper written by Oakland was Public Goods, Perfect Competition, and Underproduction. In this paper, Oakland argues that "atomistic" competition will cause an allocation of public goods which is suboptimal and is inefficiently allocated. He presented the idea that prices for individual units of a public good will vary but the prices for the public good will not vary across consumers. The paper was published in 1974.

== Analysis of post-Katrina New Orleans ==
Oakland had studied the economics of the city of New Orleans for many years and following the damage caused by Hurricane Katrina, Oakland contributed by performing an analysis to explain the low amount of population return to the area.

Oakland's analysis stated that historically high levels of unemployment and limited job mobility in New Orleans were the root cause of this issue. According to Oakland's study, there was a very high unemployment rate in the New Orleans area before Hurricane Katrina affected it and this was largely because of the limited job mobility caused by high concentrations of the city's poorest people living in a few areas. Oakland was quoted in the New York Times regarding his analysis, “Where there are high concentrations of poverty, people can’t see a way out. Maybe the diaspora is a blessing.” Oakland's analysis showed that the living conditions in New Orleans were not attractive for the poor to begin with and Hurricane Katrina provided an exit from those conditions, resulting in the lack of interest to return to the area.

== Honors received ==
1. Brookings Institution Fellow (1963–1964)
2. Woodrow Wilson Fellow (1961–1963)
3. Who's Who in America (1986)
