= Ebonya Washington =

Economist

Ebonya Lia Washington
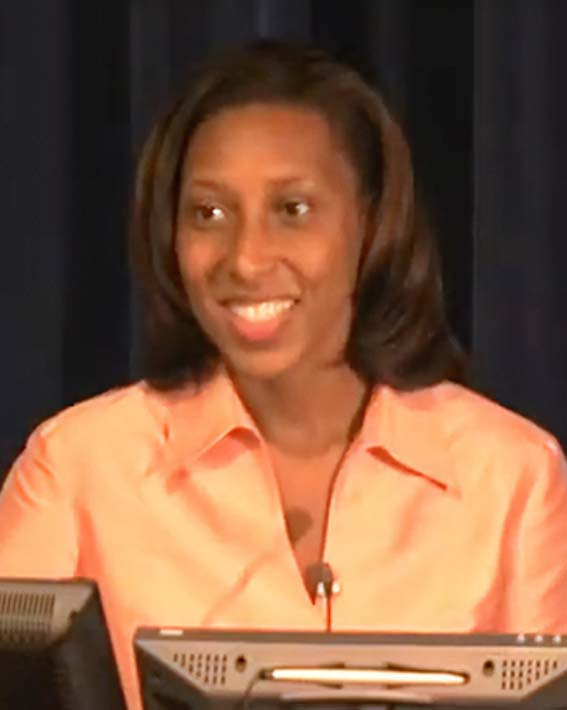
- Education: Brown University, Massachusetts Institute of Technology
- Scientific career
- Fields: Economics
- Workplaces: Columbia University; Yale University
- Doctoral advisor: Sendhil Mullainathan; Jonathan Gruber
- Website: ebonyawashington.com

Ebonya L. Washington is the Laurans A. and Arlene Mendelson Professor of Economics at Columbia University and a professor of public and international affairs. She is also a National Bureau of Economic Research Faculty Research Fellow in the Programs on Political Economy and the Economics of Children. She was elected to the American Academy of Arts & Sciences in 2021.

Her research focuses on the political economy of low-income and minority constituents and the processes through which low-income Americans meet their financial needs. Several of her papers have been discussed in the popular press. She is associate editor of the Quarterly Journal of Economics and the foreign editor of the Review of Economic Studies.

She was elected a Fellow of the Econometric Society in 2021. She was formerly the Samuel C. Park Jr. Professor of Economics at Yale University.

== Education ==
Washington received her BA from Brown University in 1995 and her PhD in economics at MIT in 2003.

== Research highlights ==
=== "Why Did the Democrats Lose the South? Bringing New Data to an Old Debate" (with Ilyana Kuziemko) ===
In this paper, Washington and Kuziemko use historical Gallup data on racial attitudes and political preferences to empirically examine why Southern whites left the Democratic party in the second half of the 20th century. This notable political shift has been a central question in Political Economy and has conventionally lead to two competing explanations: (1) Civil Rights caused racially conservative whites to leave the party and (2) economic development in the South made Democratic redistributive policies unattractive. They find evidence that defection among racially conservative whites explains most of the decline in white Democratic identification among Southerners from 1958 to 1980, which lends credence to the Civil Rights attitudes over the economic development hypothesis.

=== Other selected works ===
- Cascio, Elizabeth U.; Washington, Ebonya L. (2014). "Valuing the Vote: The Redistribution of Voting Rights and State Funds Following the Voting Rights Act of 1965". Quarterly Journal of Economics. 129 (1): 376–433. doi:10.1093/qje/qjt028.
- Washington, Ebonya L. (2008). "Female socialization: how daughters affect their legislator fathers' voting on women's issues" (PDF). The American Economic Review. 98 (1): 311–332. doi:10.1257/aer.98.1.311. JSTOR 29729973.
- Mullainathan, Sendhil; Washington, Ebonya (2009). "Sticking with your vote: Cognitive dissonance and political attitudes". American Economic Journal: Applied Economics. 1 (1): 86–111. doi:10.1257/app.1.1.86. JSTOR 25760148.
- Gerber, Alan S.; Huber, Gregory A.; Washington, Ebonya (2010). "Party affiliation, partisanship, and political beliefs: A field experiment". American Political Science Review. 104 (4): 720–744. doi:10.1017/S0003055410000407. JSTOR 40982894.
- Washington, Ebonya (2006). "How black candidates affect voter turnout" (PDF). The Quarterly Journal of Economics. 121 (3): 973–998. doi:10.1162/qjec.121.3.973. JSTOR 25098814. S2CID 14545508.

== Economics Profession and Race/Ethnicity ==
Washington was the co-chair on the Committee on the Status of Minority Groups in the Economics Profession (CSMGEP) from 2018 to 2024. The CSMGEP has a website which hosts minority job candidates in economics, publishes a yearly newsletter titled the Minority Report, and provides links and resources for making the economics profession more diverse. It also runs three programs to increase the representation of Blacks in the profession: a Summer Training Program, a Mentoring Program, and a Summer Economics Fellows Program. Yet, it was reported that in 2016 only 3% of PhD degrees in economics went to Blacks. Washington has written and lectured extensively about the difficulties for African Americans in the economics profession. In October 2020, Washington and her co-chair Gary Hoover, pushed the American Economic Association to implement 5 new programs on diversity including an undergraduate essay prize in honor of Andrew Brimmer, a travel grant for underrepresented minorities, and a seed grant for economics departments to start programs aimed at diversity and inclusion.
