= Murphy Institute =

American research and educational center in New Orleans

The Murphy Institute is a research and educational center that supports a number of academic programs in the fields of political economy and ethics at Tulane University, New Orleans, Louisiana, United States.

== History ==
The Murphy Institute was founded in 1980 with a generous contribution from the Murphy family. It was established to be a research and educational center aimed at understanding and linking the economic, ethical, and political questions and practices within our society. The Institute has three core programs: an interdisciplinary undergraduate program in political economy, established in 1984; the Center for Ethics and Public Affairs, started in 2001 to address critical ethical questions and dilemmas related to citizenship, justice, community, and professional responsibility; and the Public Policy program, created in 2010 seeking to foster research and outreach on public policy. As a means to enrich teaching and research in political economy, ethics, and public policy, the Murphy Institute also regularly hosts conferences, seminars, and lectures by prominent public figures and visiting scholars and co-sponsors publications. Gary Hoover is the Director of the Murphy Institute.

=== Murphy Family ===
The Murphy Institute was established in memory of Charles H. Murphy, Sr. (1870–1954) by his son Charles H. Murphy, Jr. The Murphy Institute is supported by the endowment of the Tulane Murphy Foundation.

== Past Directors ==
- 1980–1981: William Oakland
- 1981–1984: Dagobert L. Brito
- 1984–2009: Richard F.Teichgraeber III
- 2010–2020: Steven M. Sheffrin
- 2021–present: Gary "Hoov" Hoover
