= Dan Bernhardt =

American-Canadian economist

Mark Daniel Bernhardt (born June 11, 1958) is an American-Canadian economist, focusing in industrial organization, finance and political economy, currently the IBE Distinguished Professor of Economics at University of Illinois. Bernhardt is also a professor at the University of Warwick.

Bernhardt attended Oberlin College. He graduated in 1981 with a degree in economics and mathematics, was elected to Phi Beta Kappa. He received his Ph.D. in economics from the Graduate School of Industrial Administration (now the Tepper School of Business) in 1986 and was awarded the Alexander Henderson Award for an outstanding thesis in economic theory.

Prior to being a professor at the University of Illinois, Bernhardt was a professor at Queen's University at Kingston in Kingston, Ontario. He has also worked at the University of Rochester and the Federal Reserve Bank of Cleveland.
