= Amanda Kowalski (economist) =

American health economist

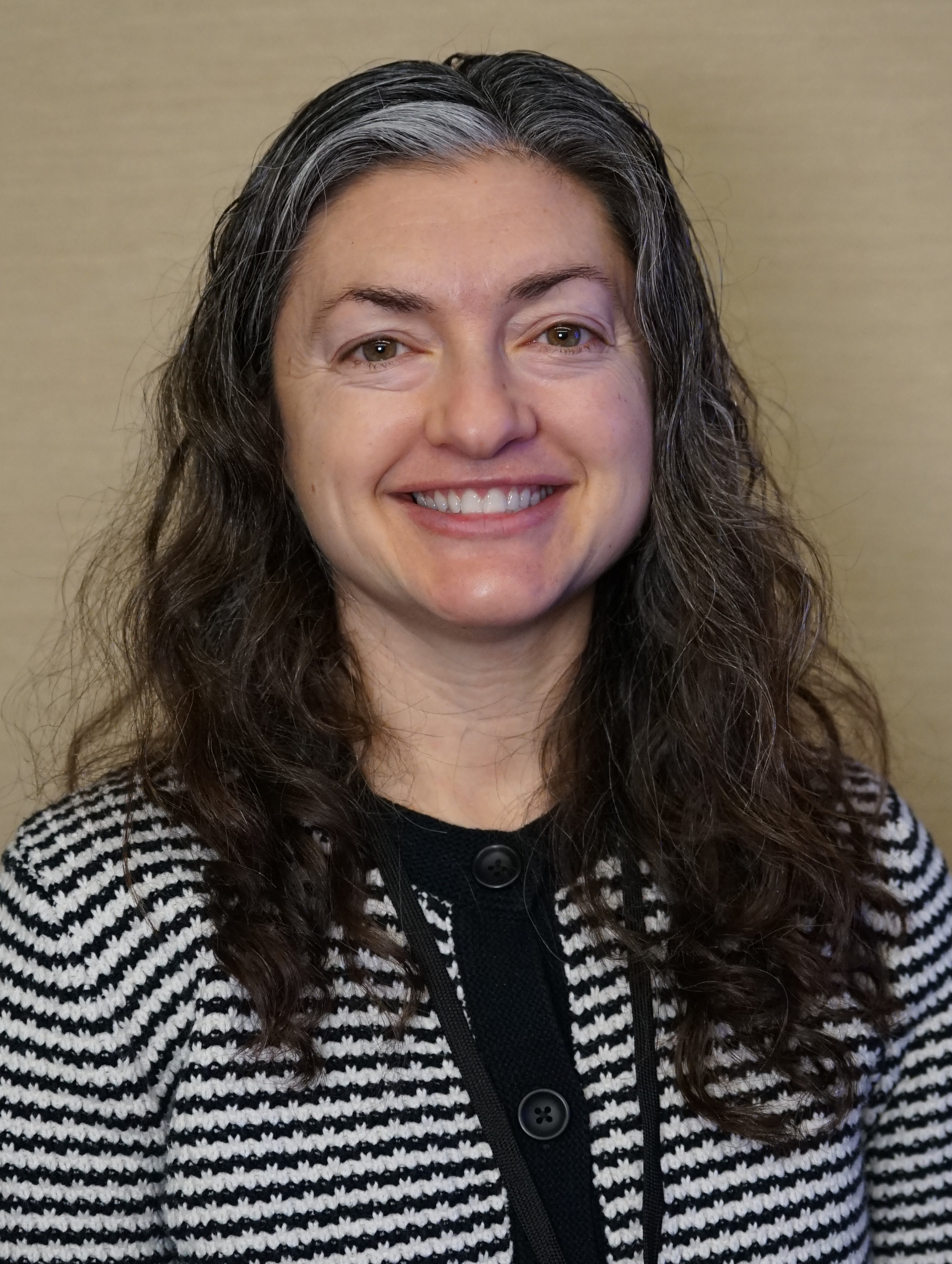
- Kowalski at ASSA 2026
- Education: Harvard University (AB); Massachusetts Institute of Technology (PhD)
- Awards: National Science Foundation CAREER Award; ASHEcon Medal
- Scientific career
- Fields: Health Economics; Econometrics
- Workplaces: University of Michigan
- Thesis: Essays on Medical Care Using Semiparametric and Structural Econometrics (2008)
- Academic advisors: Jonathan Gruber; Jerry Hausman

Amanda Kowalski is an American health economist serving as the Gail Wilensky Professor of Applied Economics at the University of Michigan. She is an elected member of the executive committee of the American Economic Association, and a research associate at the health, public economics, and aging programs of the National Bureau of Economic Research. Kowalski's research focuses on health policy, in particular on the targeting of treatments and health insurance expansions to those that need them most. She is the winner of the 2019 ASHEcon medal, awarded by the American Society of Health Economists to the best researcher under the age of 40.

== Education ==
Kowalski received her AB in Economics from Harvard University in 2003, and her PhD in economics from the Massachusetts Institute of Technology in 2008, where her doctoral research was supervised by Jonathan Gruber and Jerry Hausman. Between her undergraduate and graduate studies, Kowalski worked as a research assistant at the White House Council of Economic Advisers. After completing her PhD, Kowalski joined the National Bureau of Economic Research as a post-doctoral fellow.

== Career and research ==
Kowalski subsequently joined Yale University as an assistant professor, where she gained tenure in 2015. In 2018, she moved to the University of Michigan, where she is the Gail Wilensky Professor of Applied Economics. Over the course of her academic career, Kowalski has held visiting appointments at the Brookings Institution, Stanford Institute for Economic Policy Research, and Princeton Center for Health and Well-Being.

In addition to her academic appointments, Kowalski is a research associate at the National Bureau of Economic Research. She was elected to the 2024 executive committee of the American Economic Association, and sits on the board of directors of the American Society of Health Economists.

Kowalski's research interests are in health economics, particularly concerning the targeting of treatments and health insurance expansions to those that need them most. Her research has examined several health policy reforms in the United States, including the 2006 Massachusetts health care reform and Patient Protection and Affordable Care Act.

=== Massachusetts healthcare reform ===
Several of Kowalski's early works examined the health effects of the 2006 Massachusetts health care reform. In a paper with Jonathan Kolstad, Kowalski shows that the reform increased the insured population of Massachusetts, with no corresponding increase in the growth rate in hospital costs. This is because of decreases in average length of stay and the number of emergency department admissions.

In a recent paper, Kowalski also addresses discrepancies in estimated effects of the Massachusetts health care reform and Oregon Medicaid health experiment on emergency department visits. She shows that beneficiaries of the Massachusetts health care reform were healthier than their counterparts who received health insurance in Oregon, and that differences in group composition can explain divergent effects on emergency department visitation.

=== Affordable Care Act and Medicaid expansion ===
Kowalski has also pursued research on the effects of Medicaid expansion. In a paper with David Brown and Ithai Lurrie, Kowalski shows that expansions to Medicaid in the 1980s and 1990s increased covered children's earnings, increasing tax receipts and decreasing earned income tax credit claims. They find that these effects allowed the government to recoup 56 cents on every dollar of Medicaid spending.

In an article in Brookings Papers on Economic Activity, Kowalski shows that the ACA Medicaid expansions caused welfare losses, with results driven by states that experienced technical glitches or ceded ACA enforcement to the federal government.

== Awards and honors ==
She is the recipient of a National Science Foundation CAREER Award, and won the 2019 ASHEcon medal, awarded by the American Society of Health Economists to the best health economist under the age of 40.
