= Wojciech Kopczuk =

Polish economist and academic

- Awards: Ig Nobel Prize (2001)

Academic background
- Education: University of Warsaw (BA, Msc); University of Michigan (MA, PhD)

Academic work
- Discipline: Economics
- Institutions: Columbia University
- Main interests: Public Economics, Labor Economics

Wojciech Kopczuk is a professor of economics at Columbia University. He is currently the editor-in-chief of the Journal of Public Economics.

== Biography ==
Kopczuk received his BA and Msc from the University of Warsaw in 1996. He then received his MA and PhD from the University of Michigan. He taught at the University of British Columbia before joining Columbia University's faculty in 2003. He is also a research associate with the National Bureau of Economic Research's Public Economics program. His research has focused on tax policy and income and wealth inequality. Kopczuk is a critic of the wealth tax.

Kopczuk became editor-in-chief of the Journal of Public Economics in September 2017.

He received an Ig Nobel Prize in 2001 for discovering that people will try to postpone their own deaths to avoid the inheritance tax.

== See also ==
- List of Ig Nobel Prize winners
