= Anna Aizer =

Labor and health economist

- Title: Professor of Economics

Academic background
- Education: Amherst College; Harvard University; UCLA

Anna Aizer is a labor and health economist, who currently serves as the Maurice R. Greenberg Professor of Economics at Brown University where she is also a Faculty Associate at the Population Studies and Training Center. Her research focuses on child health and well-being, in particular the effect of societal factors and social issues on children's health.

== Biography ==
Aizer received her Bachelor of Arts degree from Amherst College in Amherst, Massachusetts, in 1991, a Master of Science at Harvard University in 1995, and a PhD at the University of California, Los Angeles in 2002. She then went on to a postdoctoral fellowship at Princeton University's Center for Research on Child Bearing, before becoming a professor and the chair of the economic department at Brown University where she currently works. She is also a co-director of the NBER's program on children.

== Research ==
As a labor and health economist, Aizer has an interest in child health and well-being. Her scholarly interests are child health, child support, domestic violence, Medicaid, poverty and welfare, and her recent focus is on the inter-generational transmission of health and income.

=== Inter-generational transmission of poverty ===
Together with economist Janet Currie, Aizer published a paper in Science as a co-author, arguing that inequality of outcomes could be passed on through maternal disadvantage. Descending from the bad parental health, maternal disadvantage leads to the poor health of the children at birth. This also leads to less access in medical care, further worsening the health of children. Yet, the health of the newborn children is improving among the most disadvantaged population, likely due to the improvement in public policies and the increase in the knowledge of infant health.

With Shari Eli, Joseph Ferrie and Adriana Lleras-Muney, Aizer also estimated the long-term impact of cash transfers to poor families from the records of applicants to the Mother's Pension program and death records. From this the authors found that the male children of the accepted applicants lived longer, got more years of schooling, were less likely to be underweight and had higher income than that of the rejected mothers.

Cooperating with Laura Stroud and Stephen Buka, Aizer studied the effect of maternal stress on offspring outcomes. They found that the exposure to high levels of stress hormone negatively affects the offspring's cognition, health and educational attainment. By establishing the relationship between the cortisol level and the development of human capital, the study also reveals the impact of elevated cortisol on the offspring, making a link with the topic of inter-generational persistence of poverty.

=== Child health and well-being ===
A major topic of Aizer's work has been access for children to social services. Aizer has found that barriers public health insurance enrollment include the information and the administrative costs. These barriers differ based on race.

Aizer also published an article focusing on adult supervision and child behavior, examining the issue of children spending their school years without adult supervision due to the growth in the number of women entering the workforce and the high cost of child care.

In 2015, Aizer published an article on juvenile incarceration in the Quarterly Journal of Economics with Joseph J. Doyle Jr. In this study, they estimate the effects of juvenile incarceration on the completion of high school and adult recidivism by analyzing the incarceration tendency of randomly assigned judges. Together, they found incarceration of juveniles significantly reduces rates of returning to school while increasing the frequency of juveniles classified as emotionally or behaviorally disordered when juveniles do return to school.

== Selected works ==
- Aizer, Anna (September 2010). "The gender wage gap and domestic violence". American Economic Review. 100 (4): 1847–1859. doi:10.1257/aer.100.4.1847. ISSN 0002-8282. PMC 4123456. PMID 25110354.
- Aizer, Anna; Doyle, Joseph J. (May 1, 2015). "Juvenile incarceration, human capital, and future crime: Evidence from randomly assigned judges". The Quarterly Journal of Economics. 130 (2): 759–803. doi:10.1093/qje/qjv003. hdl:1721.1/97380. ISSN 0033-5533. JSTOR 26372613. (Preprint).
- Aizer, Anna; Currie, Janet (2004). "Networks or neighborhoods? Correlations in the use of publicly-funded maternity care in California". Journal of Public Economics. 88 (12): 2573–2585. doi:10.1016/j.jpubeco.2003.09.003. (Preprint).
- Aizer, Anna (July 12, 2007). "Public health insurance, program take-up, and child health". Review of Economics and Statistics. 89 (3): 400–415. doi:10.1162/rest.89.3.400. ISSN 0034-6535. JSTOR 40043038. ResearchGate 24096120.
- Aizer, Anna (August 2004). "Home alone: Supervision after school and child behavior". Journal of Public Economics. 88 (9): 1835–1848. doi:10.1016/S0047-2727(03)00022-7.
- Aizer, Anna; Currie, Janet (May 23, 2014). "The intergenerational transmission of inequality: Maternal disadvantage and health at birth". Science. 344 (6186): 856–861. Bibcode:2014Sci...344..856A. doi:10.1126/science.1251872. ISSN 0036-8075. PMC 4578153. PMID 24855261.
- Aizer, Anna; Cunha, Flávio (September 25, 2012). The production of human capital: Endowments, investments and fertility (PDF) (Report). NBER Working Paper Series. Cambridge, Massachusetts: National Bureau of Economic Research. doi:10.3386/w18429.
- Aizer, Anna; Eli, Shari; Ferrie, Joseph; Lleras-Muney, Adriana (April 2016). "The long-run impact of cash transfers to poor families". American Economic Review. 106 (4): 935–971. doi:10.1257/aer.20140529. ISSN 0002-8282. PMC 5510957. PMID 28713169.
- Aizer, Anna (July 2011). "Poverty, violence, and health: The impact of domestic violence during pregnancy on newborn health". Journal of Human Resources. 46 (3): 518–538. doi:10.1353/jhr.2011.0024. ISSN 0022-166X. PMC 4019993. PMID 24839303. doi:10.3368/jhr.46.3.518.
- Aizer, Anna (April 2003). "Low take-up in Medicaid: Does outreach matter and for whom?". American Economic Review. 93 (2): 238–241. doi:10.1257/000282803321947119. ISSN 0002-8282.
- Aizer, Anna; Stroud, Laura; Buka, Stephen (August 2016). "Maternal stress and child outcomes: Evidence from siblings". Journal of Human Resources. 51 (3): 523–555. doi:10.3368/jhr.51.3.0914-6664R. ISSN 0022-166X. JSTOR 26449864. PMC 5673140. PMID 29118458.
- Aizer, Anna (September 2008). Peer effects and human capital accumulation: The externalities of ADD (PDF) (Report). NBER Working Paper Series. Cambridge, Massachusetts: National Bureau of Economic Research. doi:10.3386/w14354.
- Aizer, Anna; Grogger, Jeffrey (August 13, 2003). Parental Medicaid expansions and health insurance coverage (PDF) (Report). NBER Working Paper Series. Cambridge, Massachusetts: National Bureau of Economic Research. doi:10.3386/w9907.
- Aizer, Anna; McLanahan, Sara (January 1, 2006). "The impact of child support enforcement on fertility, parental investments, and child well-being". Journal of Human Resources. 41 (1): 28–45. doi:10.3368/jhr.XLI.1.28. ISSN 0022-166X. JSTOR 40057256. doi:10.3368/jhr.41.1.28.
- Aizer, Anna; Currie, Janet; Moretti, Enrico (August 2007). "Does managed care hurt health? Evidence from Medicaid mothers". Review of Economics and Statistics. 89 (3): 385–399. doi:10.1162/rest.89.3.385. ISSN 0034-6535.
