= The Journal of Human Resources =

Journal of Human Resources
- Discipline: Microeconomics
- Language: English
- Edited by: Anna Aizer

Publication details
- History: 1965-present
- Publisher: University of Wisconsin Press
- Frequency: Bimonthly
- Impact factor: 5.784 (2021)

Standard abbreviations
- ISO 4: J. Hum. Resour.

Indexing
- CODEN: JHREA9
- ISSN: 0022-166X (print); 1548-8004 (web)
- LCCN: 66009974
- JSTOR: jhumanresources
- OCLC no.: 1604126

Links
- Journal homepage; Online access; Online archive

The Journal of Human Resources is a bimonthly peer-reviewed academic journal covering empirical microeconomics. It was established in 1965 and is published by The University of Wisconsin Press. The editor-in-chief is Anna Aizer (Brown University). According to the Journal Citation Reports, the journal has a 2021 impact factor of 5.784, ranking it 42 out of 379 journals in the category 'Economics'.
