= Stanford Institute for Economic Policy Research =

Economics research institute at Stanford University

The Stanford Institute for Economic Policy Research (SIEPR) is an independent research institute of the Policy and Social Sciences Academic Units at Stanford University.

== History ==
The institute was founded in 1982 as a way to bring together economic scholars from different parts of the university. George Shultz was a key player in its inception. The current director of the institute is Mark Duggan.
