= Journal of Public Economics =

- Discipline: Public economics
- Language: English
- Edited by: John Friedman, Wojciech Kopczuk

Publication details
- History: 1972-present
- Publisher: Elsevier
- Frequency: Monthly
- Impact factor: 2.218 (2019)

Standard abbreviations
- ISO 4: J. Public Econ.

Indexing
- CODEN: JPBEBK
- ISSN: 0047-2727
- LCCN: 75640140
- OCLC no.: 1798094

Links
- Journal homepage; Online access

The Journal of Public Economics is a monthly peer-reviewed academic journal covering public economics, with particular emphasis on the application of modern economic theory and methods of quantitative analysis. It provides a forum for discussion of public policy of interest to an international readership. It was established in 1972 by Tony Atkinson and is published by Elsevier. The current editors-in-chief are John Friedman (Brown University) and Wojciech Kopczuk (Columbia University). According to the Journal Citation Reports, the journal has a 2019 impact factor of 2.218.
