= Journal of Health Economics =

- Discipline: Health economics, Public health
- Language: English

Publication details
- History: 1982–present
- Publisher: Elsevier
- Frequency: Bimonthly
- Impact factor: 3.883 (2020)

Standard abbreviations
- ISO 4: J. Health Econ.

Indexing
- ISSN: 0167-6296

Links
- Journal homepage

The Journal of Health Economics is a peer-reviewed academic journal that publishes articles about health economics and related fields concerning human health care and medicine. The journal is published six times annually by Elsevier.

The editors-in-chief are M. Alsan (Harvard Kennedy School), Anderson (University of California, Berkeley), A. Balsa (University of Montevideo), M.K. Bundorf (Stanford University), C. Carpenter (Vanderbilt University), J. Cawley (Cornell University), J.P. Clemens (University of California, San Diego), M. Kifmann (Universität Hamburg), M. Lindeboom (Vrije Universiteit Amsterdam), O.A. O'Donnell (Erasmus Universiteit), M. Shah (University of California at Los Angeles), L. Siciliani (University of York), and K. Simon (Indiana University). According to the Journal Citation Reports, the journal has a 2020 impact factor of 3.883.
