= David Throsby =

Australian economist (born 1939)

David Throsby AO
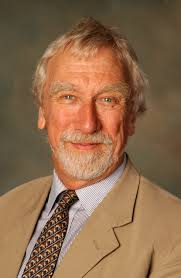
- Born: Charles David Throsby; Australia
- Occupations: Distinguished Professor of Economics, Macquarie University, Sydney
- Spouse: Robin Hughes (m. 1966)

Charles David Throsby AO (born 14 May 1939) is an Australian economist. He is especially well known as a cultural economist. His book Economics and Culture (2001) has become a standard reference work in the field. In addition to the performing arts, Throsby's research and writing has covered the economic role of artists, the economics of public intervention in arts markets, cultural development, cultural policy, heritage issues, and sustainability of cultural processes. He has also written extensively on the theory of public goods and the economics of higher education.

== Biography ==
Throsby is a Distinguished Professor of Economics at Macquarie University, Sydney. His secondary education was at North Sydney Boys High School. As an undergraduate he studied at the University of Sydney and received his doctorate from the London School of Economics. He is a past-president of the Association for Cultural Economics International (ACEI) and Foundation Chair of the National Association for the Visual Arts. He is on the editorial boards of journals including the Journal of Cultural Economics and the International Journal of Cultural Policy and has served on the boards of the Museum of Contemporary Art, Sydney, The Australian Museum and the Copyright Agency Ltd. His survey of cultural economics in JEL has been frequently quoted since 1994. His most recent book is The Economics of Cultural Policy (2010).

== Personal ==
He is the brother of the ABC broadcaster Margaret Throsby and uncle of the singer Holly Throsby. He is married to the filmmaker Robin Hughes.

== Select publications ==
- Throsby, David and V. A. Ginsburgh (eds). Handbook of the Economics of Art and Culture, Vol. 2, North-Holland, 2014.
- Throsby, David. "The Political Economy of Art: Ruskin and contemporary cultural economics", History of Political Economy, 43(2): 275-294. 2011.
- Throsby, David. The Economics of Cultural Policy, Cambridge University Press, Cambridge, 2010.
- Throsby, David and Michael Hutter (eds). Beyond Price: Value in Culture, Economics and the Arts, Cambridge University Press, New York, 2008.
- Throsby, David. "The Concentric Circles Model of the Cultural Industries", Cultural Trends 17 (3): 147-64. 2008.
- Throsby, David. Does Australia Need a Cultural Policy? Platform Paper No. 7, Currency Press, Sydney, 2006.
- Throsby, David. Economics and Culture, Cambridge University Press, 2000.
- Throsby, David. "The Production and Consumption of the Arts: A View of Cultural Economics", Journal of Economic Literature, Vol. XXXII, 1994, pp. 1–29.
- Throsby, David & Glen Withers. The Economics of the Performing Arts, Edward Arnold (Australia), 1979, reprinted by Gregg Revivals, Hampshire, England, 1993.

== See also ==
- History of schools of economic thought on arts and culture
- Economic theory of museums
