= Margaret Throsby =

Australian radio broadcaster

Margaret Throsby AM
- Born: Margaret Ellen Throsby; 1941 (age 84–85); Neutral Bay, New South Wales, Australia
- Occupations: Radio broadcaster, television broadcaster
- Family: David Throsby (brother); Holly Throsby (daughter)

Margaret Ellen Throsby AM, (born 1941) is an Australian radio and television broadcaster. She is known for having interviewed thousands of notable people for Australian Broadcasting Corporation radio programs. Throsby was the first woman in Australia to present TV News at the ABC.

== Early life ==
Margaret Ellen Throsby was born in 1941 in Neutral Bay, a lower north shore suburb of Sydney. Her father was Charles Throsby, an English barrister who died when she was 12, and her mother was Alison Battarbee, a cellist with the Sydney Symphony Orchestra. She attended North Sydney Girls High School, then spent a year studying speech pathology after leaving school.

== Career ==
Her association with the ABC began when she joined its announcing staff in 1967. Since then she has overcome major barriers to the accepted roles for women in broadcasting. On 15 October 1975 she became the first woman to read national radio news since World War II, and in 1978 she was the first woman to present national television news.

Her morning program, The Margaret Throsby Show, on 2BL, won high audience ratings. In 1993 her ABC contract was not renewed due to her having made a series of advertisements for Macquarie Bank. She was replaced by Jennifer Byrne for nine months before being invited back to fill in for Geraldine Doogue.

Throsby's interview program, variously named Midday with Margaret Throsby, The Margaret Throsby Interview, The Morning Interview with Margaret Throsby and The Margaret Throsby Program, was a weekly Australian radio program on the Australian Broadcasting Corporation's Classic FM network. Guests came from a wide range of backgrounds, including "Prime Ministers, divas, trailblazers and humanitarians", and the guests' lives, work and musical interests were explored in wide-ranging interviews. Her interviews based on this format spanned around 25 years.

She presented ABC Classic FM's Mornings with Margaret Throsby program from 1994 to 2011. Each morning an hour was devoted to an interview with notable guests interspersed with some of their own musical choices in a format devised by Throsby and the then manager, Peter James. From 2012 to 2016, the interview was broadcast at noon with the program being known as Midday, also known as The Midday Interview.

In 2017, her program was on Saturday mornings from 9 am to 12 pm, when she co-presented with a guest presenter who talked about their love of classical music. In October of that year, it was announced that her program would no longer be aired, but she would continue to present concerts broadcast on ABC Classic FM.

From November 2019 Throsby presented The Margaret Throsby Interviews at 10am on Mondays on Classic FM.

Over the course of her career, Throsby's thousands of interviewees have included Paul Keating, Jane Fonda, Bruce Beresford, Yvonne Kenny, John le Carre and Spike Milligan.

In September 2022, she announced her retirement from the ABC after a 55 year tenure.

== Personal life ==
Throsby is the sister of David Throsby, a cultural economist, and Adrienne Bennett, formerly executive director of the Australian Psychological Society.

She has been married and divorced three times. From her first marriage she had a son, Timothy Marc, who died in a motorbike accident in Thailand in 1996. From her second marriage, to John Buttsworth, a psychiatrist and art and furniture dealer, she is the mother of the musician Holly Throsby. Her third marriage was to Graham McCarter, a Scottish photographer. She also has a stepdaughter, Caitlin.

== Honours and awards ==
- 1989: In the Queen's Birthday Honours, Member of the Order of Australia, for service to radio broadcasting
- Variety Club of Australia's Radio Award
- Two Avion Awards for the best in the world in-flight programs (Qantas)
- Golden Gavel Award presented by the Law Society of New South Wales for "Excellence in Legal Reporting"
- Children's Week Award for Services to Children – Media Award
- Rostrum Speaker of the Year
