= Robin Hughes (filmmaker) =

Australian filmmaker

Robin Hughes AO
- Born: Eleanor Robin Hughes; Sydney, Australia
- Education: PhD in Creative Writing, Macquarie University, 2019
- Title: Pro-Chancellor of the Australian National University
- Term: 2014–2017
- Spouse: David Throsby

Robin Hughes AO (born Eleanor Robin Hughes) is an Australian filmmaker, producer and writer. She was Pro-Chancellor of the Australian National University from 2014 until 2017.

== Early life ==
Hughes was born in Sydney, and attended Fort Street High School. She received a BA in Psychology from the University of Sydney.

== Career ==
Hughes started her career in London as a producer for BBC Radio before moving back to Sydney to join ABC Radio's newly-formed Science Unit. She was head of Film Australia from 1985–1989, where she restructured the entire company and established the first animation unit. She went on to produce a number of award-winning documentaries for television, including Australians with Mike Willesee. From 1991-1997 she served as Chair of the Council of the Australian Film, Television and Radio School. From 1992 until 2007 she was the writer and interviewer for Australian Biography, an archival project and television series produced by Screen Australia that aired on SBS television, and included interviews with some of Australia's most important thinkers, entertainers, artists and musicians, including Nugget Coombs, Smoky Dawson, Thomas Keneally, Malcolm Fraser and Donald Horne. Hughes wrote a book based on the series, entitled Australian Lives, published by Angus & Robertson. In 2012 she wrote, presented and co-produced a follow-up television series, Creative Minds, which included interviews with Geoffrey Rush, Kate Grenville and Bill Henson and also aired on SBS. Hughes has acted as Chair on the boards of several performing arts companies, including Performing Lines and Bangarra Dance Theatre. In 2019, Hughes earned a doctorate in Creative Writing from Macquarie University. She was made an Officer of the Order of Australia for services to film and broadcasting in 1993. She won the Stanley Hawes Award for contributions to Australian documentary-making at the 2004 Australian International Documentary Conference.

== Personal life ==
Hughes is married to cultural economist David Throsby and lives in Hunters Hill, Sydney.
