= Australian International Documentary Conference =

The Australian International Documentary Conference (AIDC) is an Australian conference for the promotion of documentary, factual and unscripted screen content, regarded as one of two major national conferences for filmmakers.

== History ==
First established in 1987, AIDC began life as a biennial conference. Over time the event has moved to several different regions in Australia, mostly being held in capital cities. Over the years it has grown from being a small conference with a few international guests, to being a major annual international event. Serving both the commercial and creative needs of the industry, the conference provides a marketplace for documentary product for national and international buyers and distributors, showcases the work of Australian and international documentary makers, and creates a forum to discuss content, craft, technology and future directions.

It was as a result of the first AIDC, held in 1987 at McLaren Vale, in the heart of South Australia's wine growing region, that the ABC introduced its pre-sale commissioning system.

It was held in Melbourne in 2006 (and possibly previous to this), before relocating back to Adelaide for five successful years until 2015, again moving to Melbourne in 2016. In that year it was held at the Australian Centre for the Moving Image (ACMI), and remained there for four years. In 2020, the event moved to State Library Victoria for one edition. The conference was held online in 2021 due to the COVID-19 pandemic in Australia, before returning to ACMI for following editions.

== Description ==
AIDC is a not-for-profit organisation committed to supporting and elevating nonfiction storytelling through creative and business opportunities across film, television, streaming, and digital media.

== List of Conferences ==
Year	Location	Theme	Director
1987	McLaren Vale	Inaugural Conference	Daniela Torsh
1991	Canberra	Ideas for Australia	Marguerite Grey
1993	Sydney	Reflecting the Future	Daniela Torsh
1995	Melbourne	(no theme)	Deb Verhoeven
1997	Brisbane	New Frontiers	Melanie Guiney
1999	Adelaide	Creativity & the Freedom to Express It	Michael Elwood
2001	Perth	(no theme)	Richard Sowada
2003	Byron Bay	Outside the Frame	Catherine Marciniak
2004	Fremantle	Journey to where sand & sea meet	John Beaton
2005	Adelaide	Common Ground New Horizons	Heather Croall
2006	Melbourne	Survival of the Fittest	Heather Croall
2007	Adelaide	Documentary: what is it good for?	Joost den Hartog
2008	Fremantle	Follow the Story...	Joost den Hartog
2009	Adelaide	Who's Watching	Joost den Hartog
2010	Adelaide	It's a small world after all	Joost den Hartog
2011	Adelaide	Network, Deal, Inspire	Joost den Hartog
2012	Adelaide	Network, Deal, Inspire	Joost den Hartog
2013	Adelaide	DocWeek	Joost den Hartog
2014	Adelaide	DocWeek	Joost den Hartog
2015	Adelaide	Net-Work-Play	Joost den Hartog
2016	Melbourne	True Stories	Britt Arthur
2017	Melbourne	Three Sides to Every Story (30th Anniversary)	Britt Arthur / Andrew Wiseman
2018	Melbourne	Southern Exposure	Alice Burgin
2019	Melbourne	The Bigger Picture	Alice Burgin
2020	Melbourne	Collective Intelligence	Alice Burgin
2021	online	Moment of Truth	Alice Burgin
2022	Melbourne	Bearing Witness	Natasha Gadd
2023	Melbourne	Agents of Change	Natasha Gadd
2024	Melbourne	Frontlines	Natasha Gadd
2025	Melbourne	Future Telling	Natasha Gadd
2026	Melbourne	Hold True	Natasha Gadd

== The Stanley Hawes Award ==
The annual Stanley Hawes Award for contribution to the documentary in Australia was announced at each AIDC until 2023.

The Stanley Hawes Award was established in 1997 to honour Stanley Hawes as first Producer-in-Chief of the Australian National Film Board and Commonwealth Film Unit. The award recognises the significant support he gave independent filmmakers in the documentary sector and is awarded to a person that makes an outstanding contribution to the documentary sector in Australia.

=== Previous winners ===
- Graham Chase (1997)
- John Heyer (1999)
- Pat Fiske (2001)
- Stewart Young (2003)
- Robin Hughes (2004)
- CAAMA Productions (2005)
- John Hughes (2006)
- Michael Gissing (2007)
- David Bradbury (2008)
- Bob Connolly (2009)
- Tom Zubrycki (2010)
- Rachael Perkins (2011)
- Julia Overton (2012)
- Documentary Australia Foundation (2013)
- Chris Hilton (2014)
- Pauline Clague (2015)
- Sonya Pemberton (2016)
- Brian Beaton (2017)
- Curtis Levy (2018)
- James Bradley (2019)
- Janine Hosking (2020)
- Michaela Perske (2021)
- David Tiley (2022)
- Dr Cathy Henkel (2023)

== The Southern Light Award ==
The annual AIDC Southern Light Award was established in 2024 to celebrate luminaries of the Australian documentary and factual industry.

Expanding the eligibility scope of the pre-existing Stanley Hawes Award, presented from 1997 – 2023, the AIDC Southern Light Award is a $5,000 cash prize presented by AIDC to an Australian industry professional for their outstanding contribution to nonfiction screen, digital and/or audio media.

=== Previous winners ===
- Karina Holden (2024)
- Celia Tait (2025)
- Karla Hart, Simon Nasht (joint winners 2026)

== AIDC Awards ==
The annual AIDC Awards were established in 2021 to recognise outstanding completed works of new Australian documentary and factual content across six categories. The awards are traditionally announced on the final day of the AIDC conference.

Year	Best Feature Documentary	Best Documentary / Factual Series	Best Documentary / Factual Single	Best Short-Form Documentary	Best Audio Documentary	Best Interactive / Immersive Documentary
2021	The Australian Dream	Miriam Margoyles: Almost Australian	Looky Looky Here Comes Cooky, directed and co-written by Steven McGregor, co-written and presented by Steven Oliver	My Body Says	The Eleventh	Mt Resilience
2022	I'm Wanita	See What You Made Me Do	Our African Roots	Freedom Swimmer	Tender: Roia Atmar	Gondwana
2023	Wash My Soul in the River's Flow	The Australian Wars	Still We Rise	Eden Alone Surpasses Thee	The Greatest Menace: Inside the Gay Prison Experiment	Night Creatures
2024	This is Going to be Big	Never Let Him Go	Rebel With a Cause: Oodgeroo Noonuccal	Marungka Tjalatjunu (Dipped in Black)	House of Skulls	Turbulence: Jamais Vu
2025	Left Write Hook	Stuff The British Stole Series 2	Tough Not Toxic	Mahika Kai	This is Not a Game	Las Awichas
2026	Yurlu | Country	Revealed: Death Cap Murders	Emily: I am Kam	Wieambilla Reconstructed	Broken Trust	The World Came Flooding In

== David and Joan Williams Documentary Fellowship ==
The David and Joan Williams Documentary Fellowship was established in 2011 by Kim Williams, former CEO of News Limited, Foxtel and Fox Studios Australia, in honour of his parents. It is intended "to give an independent filmmaker enough money and time to reflect and prepare for his or her next work or to undertake relevant study and research".

The fellowship is given in the form of grants, initially overseen by filmmakers Bob Connolly and Victoria Treole, and administered by the AIDC. The first fellowship was awarded in June 2011, to producer Jennifer Peedom.

In 2015, the fellowship was worth A$50,000, and became biennial at the same time as transferring its management to the Documentary Australia Foundation.

Other recipients have included Matthew Bate, Juliet Lamont, Lynette Wallworth, Al Hicks (2015), and Erica Glynn (2017).
