= Cathy Henkel =

Australian documentary filmmaker

Dr Cathy Henkel
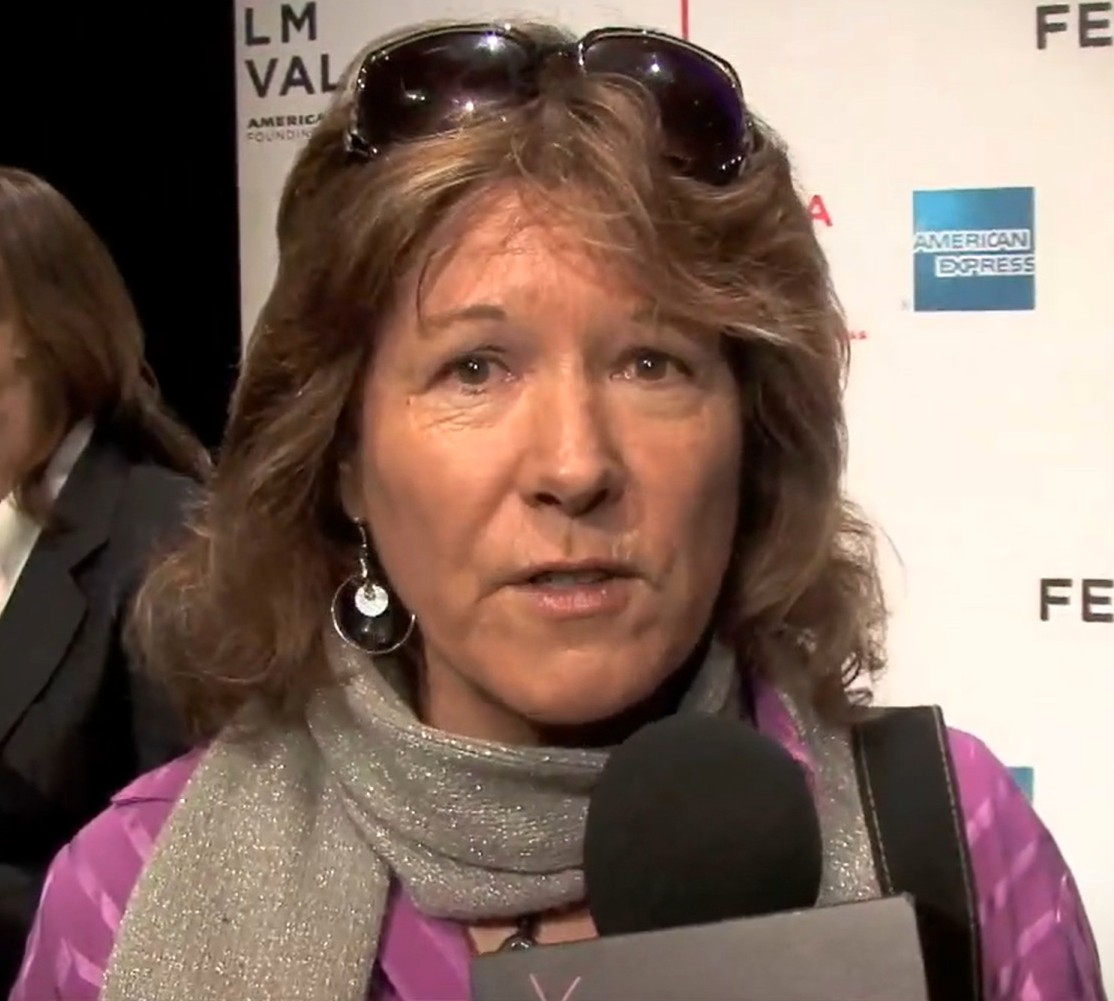
- Henkel in 2009
- Born: Johannesburg
- Education: Queensland University of Technology
- Occupation: Documentary filmmaker
- Years active: 1988 – present
- Awards: Stanley Hawes Award Recipient 2023 SPA Documentary Producer of the Year 2009 Tribeca Film Festival Best Feature Documentary 2003
- Website: https://www.virgoproductions.com.au/

Cathy Henkel is a documentary filmmaker living and working in Australia. She is the founding director of Virgo Productions, an award-winning, boutique screen industries company. In 2014 she was appointed Director of the WA Screen Academy at Edith Cowan University, and in 2019 was promoted to Associate Professor.

In 2023, Henkel received the Stanley Hawes Award, a prestigious lifetime achievement award presented by the Australian International Documentary Conference (AIDC) for her contribution to the documentary and factual sector.

== Career ==
Her career in documentary film and television writing, directing and producing began in 1988. She had previously worked as an Artistic Director for the Australian theatre company, Shopfront Theatre for Young People, for which she also wrote and directed performances. Her first documentary film Heroes of Our Time (1991), co-directed with Catherine Marciniak, provided the first inside look at Greenpeace during one of its 'direct action' campaigns confronting oil company Caltex.

In 1992, Henkel met Jeff Canin on a sea turtle nesting beach in Queensland and they became partners in life and in work. Following the birth of their daughter Sam Lara, they formed Hatchling Productions with the intention of producing social issue and community-based documentaries. They also established a digital post-production editing studio in the northern rivers region of New South Wales. In 1999, Henkel wrote and directed Walking Through a Minefield (1999) which documented the blockade of the proposed Jabiluka uranium mine in Australia's Northern Territory. The film was financed by SBS Independent, the Australian Film Commission and the New South Wales Film and Television Office.

In 2003, Henkel wrote and directed her first TV documentary for the Australian Broadcasting Corporation entitled The Man Who Stole My Mother's Face. The film followed Henkel's own search for justice for her mother who had experienced a traumatic sexual assault in South Africa and was awarded Best Documentary at the Tribeca Film Festival in New York in 2004. Henkel has twice explored the intersecting topics of deforestation and climate change with The Burning Season (2008) and Rise of the Eco-Warriors (2014). Henkel was the writer and director of both projects, which involved extensive travel and documentation of the expanding palm oil plantations of Indonesia and their social and environmental impacts.

Henkel completed a Masters (2002) and PhD (2011) at the Queensland University of Technology.

While many of Henkel's films have explored the topic of environmental activism, others have reflected her passion for the creative arts. These include Show Me the Magic (2012) which explored the life and work of Australian cinematographer Don McAlpine and I told you I was ill: The Life and Legacy of Spike Milligan (2005).

Personal accolades include being named SPAA Documentary Producer of the Year in 2009, receiving an ACS Award and an Emmy Award nomination, and receiving the Stanley Hawes Award for her contribution to the documentary and factual sector.

In 2014 she was appointed Director of the WA Screen Academy at Edith Cowan University and moved from Brisbane, Queensland to Perth, Western Australia where she continues to reside. In 2017, she won an Excellence in Teaching Award at the Vice Chancellor’s Staff Excellence Awards, and was promoted to Associate Professor in 2019. In 2025 she was appointed to Screenwest's Industry Advisory Group Committee (IAGC), a subcommittee of the Screenwest Board.

== Early career ==
Henkel was born in Johannesburg, South Africa. She moved to Europe when she was 18, and then to Australia when she was 20, where she completed a Bachelor of Arts at the University of Melbourne. In 1978, Henkel moved to Clunes and studied at Lismore's Northern Rivers College to become a teacher. She moved to Sydney in 1982 after taking a job as a director at Shopfront.

== Rise of the Eco-Warriors ==
According to Henkel, Rise of the Eco-Warriors began with a phonecall she received from Microsoft Partners in Learning. Through a subsequent Virgo Productions partnership with Microsoft, the project developed into something she described as "too good to be true" as it focussed on engaging school students around the world. Henkel described her intention to make a 3D version of Rise of the Eco-Warriors as being like "the Avatar story, but real", though a 3D version of the film was never released. The project put out a casting call for young people to join the project in 2011. In total 215 applications were received from 26 countries. The chosen group of 15 young people would ultimately spend 100 days in the jungle of Borneo with the Dayaks, learning about the expansion of the palm oil industry and its environmental and cultural impacts.

== Laura's Choice ==
Cathy’s most recent film, Laura’s Choice, was co-directed with Sam Lara and released as a feature documentary and 2 x 1 hour series for the ABC. It won the inaugural WA Screen Culture Innovation in Feature Documentary Award (2021), and the New Zealand DocEdge Fearless/Matatoa Award. It was broadcast on ABCTV in March 2021.

== Awards ==
Cathy Henkel was the recipient of the 2023 AIDC Stanley Hawes Award, given to individuals responsible for making an outstanding contribution to the Australian documentary and factual industry.

Year	Film	Award	Won
2023	-	AIDC Stanley Hawes Award – For outstanding contribution to the Australian documentary and factual industry	Won
2021	Laura's Choice	Doc Edge International Film Festival – Fearless Award	Won
2021	Laura's Choice	Australian Directors Guild (ADG) – Best Direction in a Documentary Series	Nominated
2021	Laura's Choice	Screen Producers Australia (SPA) Awards – Feature Documentary Production of the Year	Nominated
2020	Laura's Choice	WA Screen Culture Awards – Innovation in Feature Documentary	Won
2012	Show Me The Magic	ASC Silver Award – Best Cinematography in Documentary (Cathy Henkel)	Won
2012	Show Me The Magic	Australian Directors Guild (ADG) – Best Director Documentary	Nominated
2008	The Burning Season	IF Award – Best Documentary	Won
2008	The Burning Season	Brisbane International Film Festival – Audience Choice Award	Won
2008	The Burning Season	Emmy Award – Outstanding Documentary	Nominated
2008	The Burning Season	Sydney Film Festival – Audience Choice Award	Runner up
2008	The Burning Season	Australian Director's Guild (ADG) – Best Director Documentary	Nominated
2005	I Told You I Was Ill: The Life and Legacy of Spike Milligan	Film Critics Circle of Australia – Best Documentary	Won
2003	The Man Who Stole My Mother's Face	Tribeca Film Festival – Best Feature Documentary	Won
2003	The Man Who Stole My Mother's Face	Discovery Channel IF Award – Best Documentary	Won

== Collaborators ==
=== Jeff Canin ===
Like Henkel, Canin grew up in apartheid South Africa. He left South Africa at the age of 20, shifting his focus from political to environmental issues. By 24, he had completed a Bachelor of Environmental Science degree in London. He followed his passion for sea turtles to a job with Greenpeace as the International Sea Turtle Campaigner. He served in the position for 7 1/2 years in London, Florida and Amsterdam before moving to Australia where he began to produce films. In 1992 he teamed up with Henkel to create a production company Hatchling Productions dedicated to environmental and social issue films. They released Walking Through a Minefield (1999) which showed a multi-character response to the proposed uranium mine at Jabiluka in Kakadu National Park. Later collaborations include The Burning Season (2008), I Told You I Was Ill: The Life and Legacy of Spike Milligan (2005), The Man Who Stole My Mother's Face (2003) and many other films. Canin is a former Coordinator of the Clunes Technology Centre.

== Trial of Rolf Harris ==
Henkel first met entertainer Rolf Harris and his wife Alwen Hughes at a South African hotel where Henkel was a waitress in the early 1970s. He encouraged her to go to Australia and their friendship spanned over forty years. In 2014, Henkel was called to testify as a witness at Rolf Harris' trial for multiple child sexual assault charges. She had unintentionally introduced Harris to one of his victims, 13-year-old Tonya Lee in 1986 when Henkel was artistic director of an Australian theatre group, Shopfront Theater for Young People, on tour in the United Kingdom. Henkel felt pressured verbally by Harris' brother to deny assault allegations, but she resisted, testifying that while she did not see the abuse occur herself, the circumstances made the abuse possible. Rolf Harris was found guilty on 12 charges of indecent assault against four girls spanning a period from 1968 to 1986.
