= History of schools of economic thought on arts and culture =

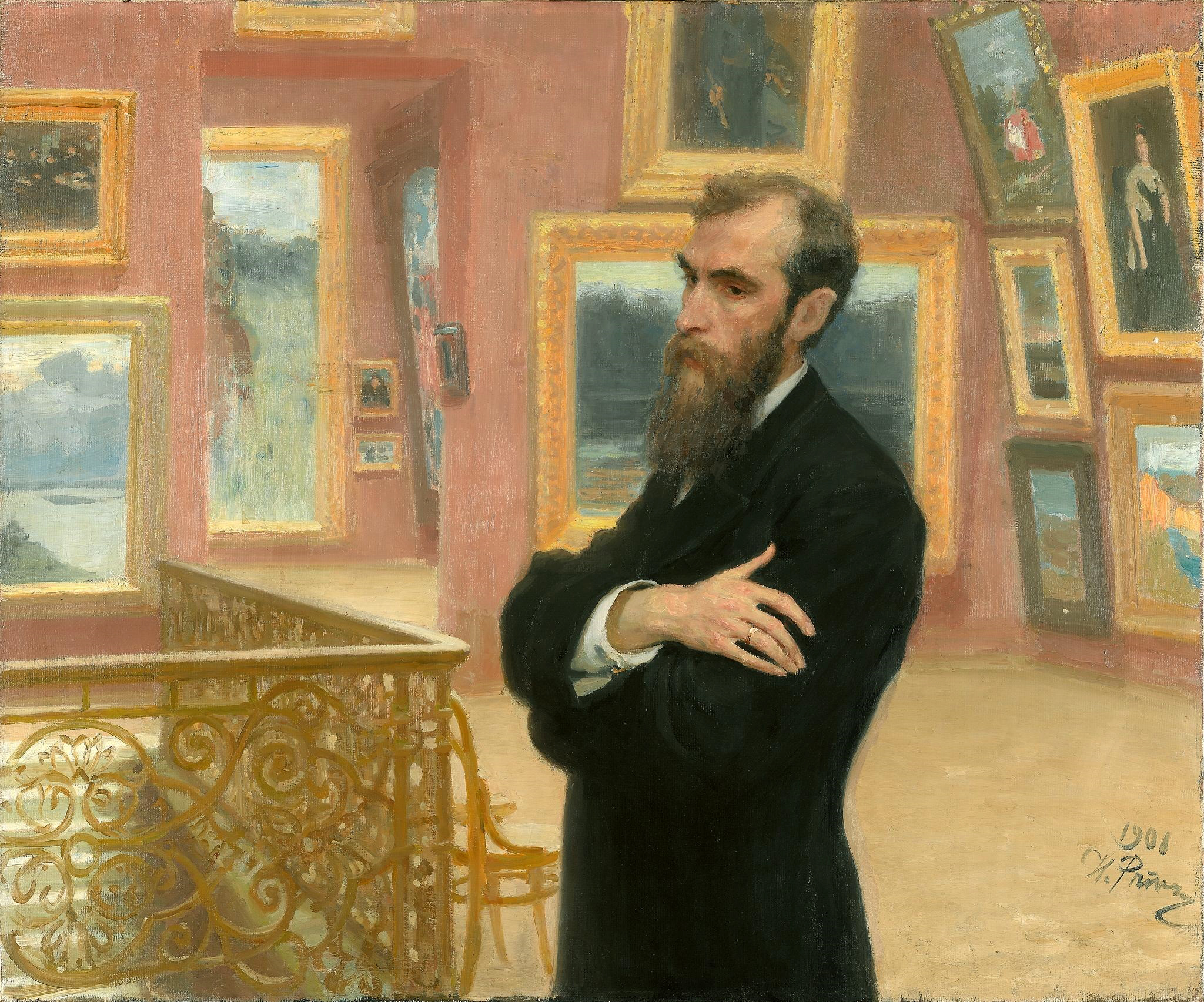
Ilya Repin, portrait of Pavel Tretyakov, 1901

The contemporary economics of culture most often takes as its starting point Baumol and Bowen's seminal work on the performing arts, which argues that reflection on the arts has been part of the history of economic thought since the birth of modern economics in the seventeenth century.

Until then, the arts had an ambivalent image. They were morally condemned as expensive activities that offered little benefit to society and were associated with the sins of pride and laziness. If they had any merit, it was in their educational value, or in their ability to prevent the rich from wasting their resources on even more harmful activities.

In the eighteenth century, Hume and Turgot helped to give a more positive image to cultural activities, presenting them as useful incentives for enrichment, and therefore for economic growth. For his part, Adam Smith highlighted the particularities of the supply and demand of cultural goods, which were to form part of the basis of the cultural economics research program.

Nineteenth-century economics sought to express general laws in the same way as the exact sciences. As a result, neither the authors of classical political economy nor the marginalists paid much attention to the specific features of the economics of culture in their research programs, even though several of them (Alfred Marshall, William Stanley Jevons) were individually sensitive to questions about the role of the arts in an industrialized economy. Reflection on the economic role of the arts and the economic conditions of their production thus came from intellectuals who integrated economic dimensions into an essentially political or aesthetic approach (Matthew Arnold, John Ruskin, and William Morris).

From the mid-twentieth century onwards, important figures such as Galbraith began to take an interest in these questions, but he failed to generate interest among both artists and his fellow economists. Similarly, although Keynes had a decisive influence on the actions of the Bloomsbury Group, which led to the United Kingdom setting up an institutional structure to support the arts (the British Arts Council), he did not directly devote any personal research work to the subject.

It was during the 1960s that the economics of culture emerged as a close disciplinary field, under the impetus of the work of Baumol and Bowen as well as work emanating from the analysis of addictive goods (Gary Becker) and the theory of public choice. Initially conceived as a crossroads between several disciplines, cultural economics has had a specialized journal since 1977, and achieved full academic recognition in 1993 with the publication of a literature review in the Journal of Economic Literature and two reference manuals.

== Cultural economics ==
Cultural economics is the branch of economics that studies the relation of culture to economic outcomes. Here, 'culture' is defined by shared beliefs and preferences of respective groups. Programmatic issues include whether and how much culture matters as to economic outcomes and what its relation is to institutions. As a growing field in behavioral economics, the role of culture in economic behavior is increasingly being demonstrated to cause significant differentials in decision-making and the management and valuation of assets.

== Before the 18th century ==
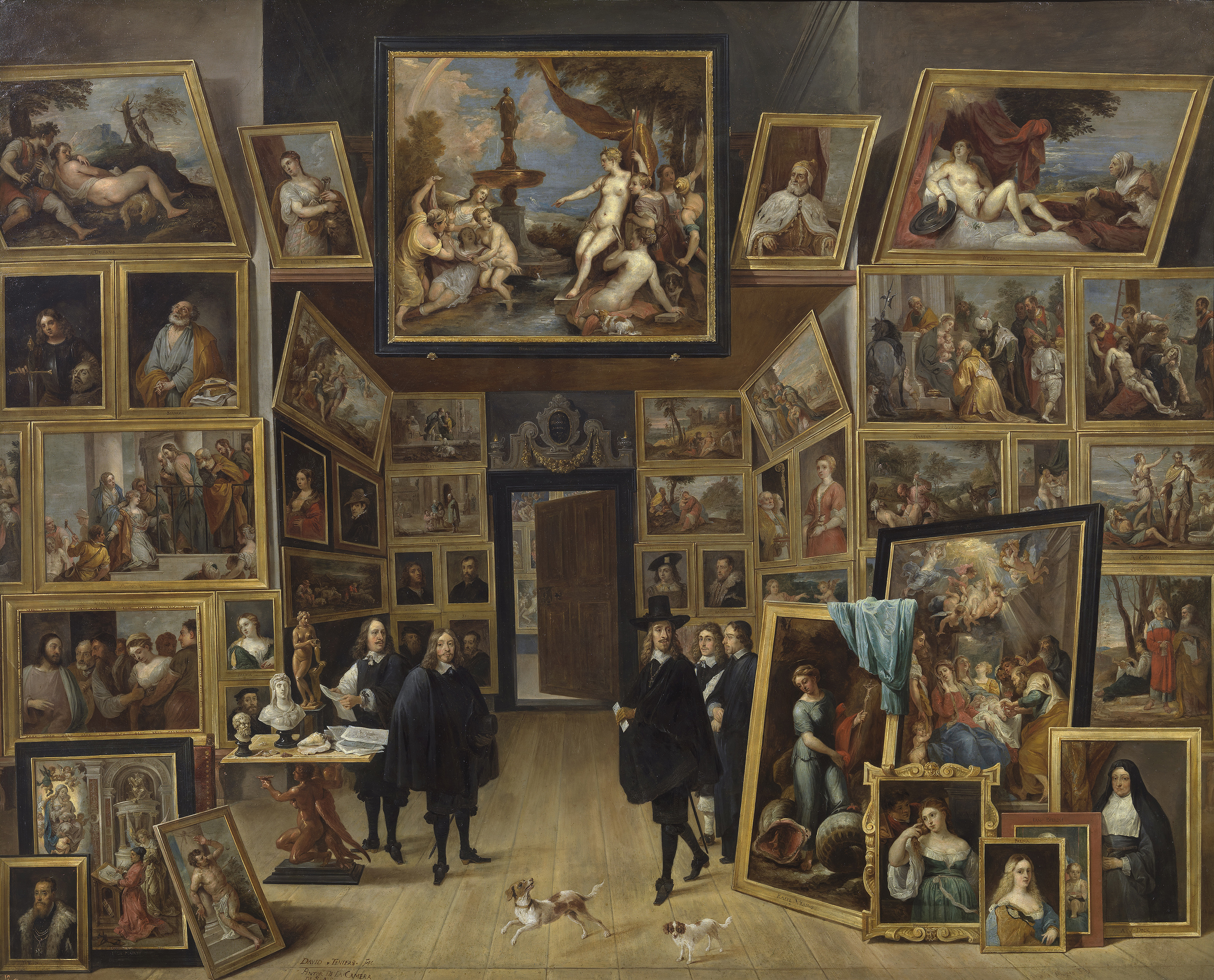
David Teniers the Younger, Archduke Leopold Wilhelm of Austria in his painting gallery, second-third of the 17th century. In accordance with the custom of the time, the paintings are displayed frame against frame, filling the entire space from floor to ceiling.

The economy prior to the eighteenth century was essentially a subsistence economy, which was also very much subject to the vagaries of geopolitics, which meant that attention was focused on ways of allocating resources to activities that produced food or strengthened the means of defence. As a result, cultural activities that detracted from production, defence or religion were generally viewed with suspicion, except by mercantilists, who saw them as a way of improving the trade balance. Cultural activities were seen as deeply linked to the passions, and as an expression of vices such as jealousy, envy, pride and lust, they were seen as something to be fought. So when Jean Bodin ranked city dwellers in order of social merit in 1576, he placed artists at the bottom. Even Bernard Mandeville, for whom the organisation of selfish passions is the driving force behind economic growth, only advises indulging in the arts as a means of avoiding other, more costly extravagances.

However, both of these authors were interested in the problem of determining the price of works of art. For Bodin, the value of works of art or luxury items was essentially determined by demand, which in turn was linked to trends. Anticipating Veblen, he highlighted the conspicuous consumption dimension of the artistic demand of his time: it was all about flaunting one's wealth.

Mandeville, for his part, also noted that an artist's reputation and the social position of his buyers had a major influence on the value placed on his work. To these determinants, he adds rarity, but also the conformity of the work to its model. In this, he agrees with Jean Bodin and Ferdinando Galiani that the fundamental value of art lies in its ability to highlight and exalt the true nature of its model and to educate viewers about virtue through its power to represent elevated feelings.

== The 18th century: imitation and imagination ==
=== Hume and Turgot: towards a rehabilitation of the arts ===
In the context of the Age of Enlightenment, David Hume clearly distinguished between art, luxury, and vice. Noting that historically, periods of greater artistic vitality were also periods of economic growth, political freedom, and virtue, he put forward the idea that luxury provided a powerful incentive for economic activity that benefited everyone. Indeed, Hume argued, "innocent luxury" sharpens the capacities of the mind and provides an incentive to work in order to acquire it, thus avoiding idleness. What's more, he adds, the consumption of luxury goods produces positive externalities for society as a whole. In economic terms, it sustains an activity that, if necessary, can be quickly converted to suit the needs of the moment. In political terms, he joins his predecessors in the idea that art nurtures civic virtues.

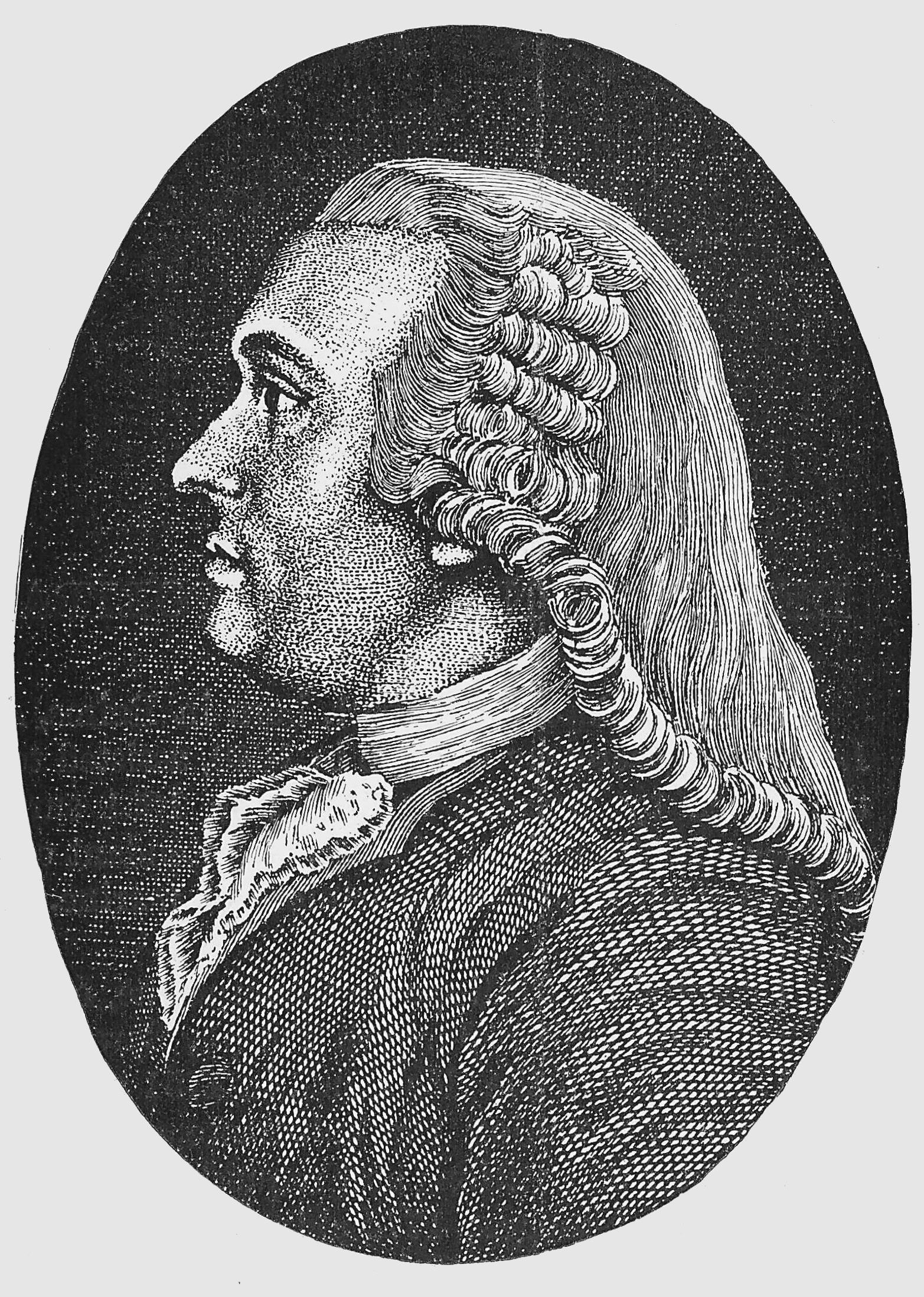
Anne Robert Jacques Turgot

In the same vein, Turgot links inequalities in development between nations to differences in the way the arts and sciences are treated, thus anticipating the notion of human capital. Using ancient Greece as an example, he noted that the development of the arts preceded that of the sciences. He established a link between spontaneous expressions of joy and dance, which in turn led to music, whose regularities encouraged the development of mathematics, and between poetry and the enrichment of language, which in turn led to philosophy.

Like Hume, Turgot insisted on the necessity, both in art and in the rest of the economy, of competition between artists by means of a large market, which implies a large demand for second-rate works of art, from which masterpieces and great artists can emerge. He bases this idea on the difference between the situation in Italy, France, and Flanders and the one in England, where the Reformation paralyzed the English art market, which was based on ecclesiastical demand, without a wealthy merchant bourgeoisie being able to take up the slack, unlike in Flanders.

He also gave a central role to patronage as the driving force behind artistic progress, citing Lorenzo de' Medici, Leo X, and Francis I as models of patrons interested in art itself, and not in an ostentatious consumer dimension. On this last point, Turgot notes that when conspicuous consumption dominates, the effects of trends and technical virtuosity take priority over genuine artistic creativity.

=== Adam Smith ===
Adam Smith set out his main thoughts on the problem of culture in his Theory of Moral Sentiments (1759). His main question was to explain the reasons for the demand for works of art. In The Wealth of Nations, he considers that the essential reasons are tradition and the effects of trends, to which he adds pure emulation. His account of how wealthy people use works of art to flaunt their wealth may have influenced Veblen's formulation of conspicuous consumption. On the supply side, he notes that the greatest artists, though innovative, are always dissatisfied with their own work in terms of what they would like to produce. However, he balances this dissatisfaction against the risks of excessive self-esteem associated with the popularity that some of them achieve. Still, on the supply side, Smith cites artists as an example of professions that require skills that are costly to acquire, and whose pay therefore reflects that cost. This effect, he notes, is less for those (philosophers, poets) whose work enables them to achieve a respected social position, and stronger for those (actors, opera singers) whose scarcity of talent is accompanied by social condemnation of their type of career. However, he places them all in the category of 'unproductive' workers (who do not lead to capital accumulation and economic growth), showing how much his thinking still owes mercantilism in failing to understand the role of services and the contribution of human capital to growth.

== The age of classic economics ==
The political economy of the nineteenth century virtually ignored the subject of arts and culture. The challenge at the time was to gain recognition for economics as a science, and thus to express general laws with as few exceptions as possible. The Age of Enlightenment's questions about the unique and exceptional nature of the arts were therefore hardly relevant to the research agenda that led to Homo economicus. (Note: Formalization of the economic agent as following an individual optimization program under constraint.)

This fear can be clearly seen in Jeremy Bentham's The Rationale of Reward. Advocating respect for the allocative efficiency of the market structure highlighted by Smith, Bentham recommends intervening as little as possible in the results of this allocation, even in cases where Smith himself recommended intervention. Bentham was very suspicious of groups demanding public assistance and saw artists as a particularly visible and effective group in demanding preferential treatment. He also noted the regressive nature of public spending on the arts. (Note: This argument states that public spending on the arts disproportionately benefits the already wealthiest section of the population, such as those who go to the opera. This spending is therefore regressive in the sense that it transfers wealth from the poorest to the richest. Since Bentham, this has been a constant angle of attack on public policies on culture and the arts.)

Poetry was one of Bentham's main targets, preferring science and finding it of little social use. On several occasions, he expressed his astonishment and incomprehension at man's fascination with the arts, which in his view were only as valuable as the pleasure they gave, and failed to understand why the arts, based on fiction and the distortion of nature, could produce more pleasure than simple play or the pursuit of scientific knowledge. At most, he finds in the arts the merit of avoiding boredom and laziness, and of providing the powerful with an occupation other than war.

In his view, the quality of a work of art was purely a matter of individual taste, and the only thing to do was to stay out of it, leaving everyone to enjoy what they liked. He saw no point in the existence of critics, or in educating people in the arts.

Such views of Bentham's, the emphasis placed only on the sectors designated as 'productive' by Smith, and the prejudices inherited from previous centuries largely explain the period's lack of interest in the economic analysis of the arts and culture. Some authors did, however, highlight the weaknesses of the distinction between productive and non-productive work. James Maitland, following on from his critique of the physiocrats, remarked that if Smith was right, competition between artists should reduce their remuneration to the level of the living wage, which was clearly not the case for successful artists. Pointing to the existence of strong barriers to entry (technical training and talent), he explains how the most talented artists constitute a rare resource, which explains the extent of the rents they receive. For the same reasons of scarcity, he refutes Smith's idea that artistic work is unproductive, the payments themselves being a sign that wealth of some kind is being created.

However, the classification of the arts as "unproductive" is also found in the writings of John Stuart Mill. It is indeed logical that an economic thought whose theory of value is based on production costs alone should fail to grasp the workings of art markets, where value resides not in the labor employed to produce the works, but in the works themselves. At the same time, however, Mill was concerned that the most common forms of remuneration did not allow most authors, albeit talented ones, to make a living from their creative work, while a few received very large sums. So he wondered what could be done to ensure a more egalitarian distribution of artistic income, starting with mass education in the arts. In his view, the latter had the dual merit of contributing to the moral improvement of the population and creating a greater solvent demand for artists.

== Humanist criticisms ==
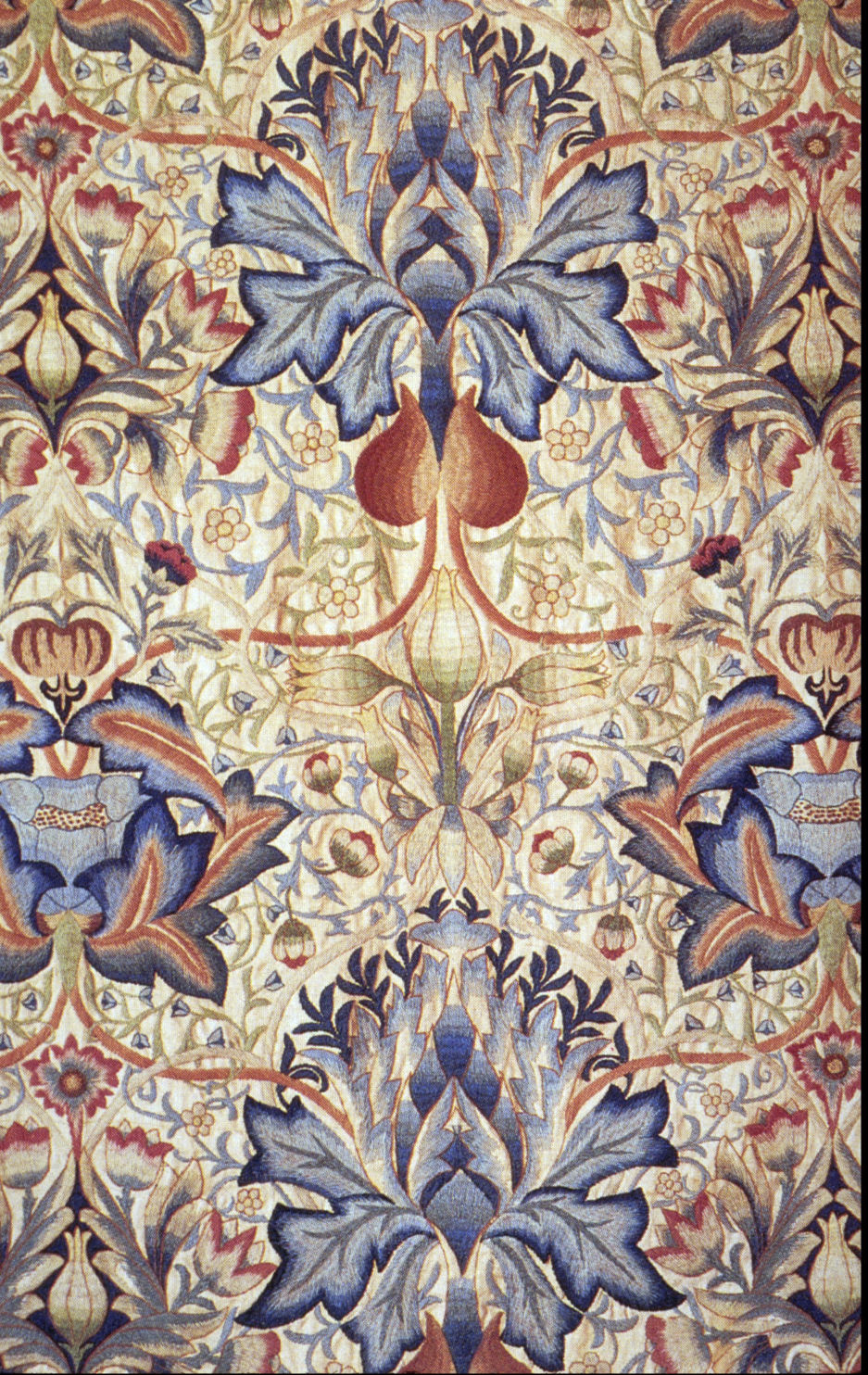
As part of the Arts & Crafts movement, William Morris advocated the omnipresence of artistic creation in everyday life through arts and crafts.

With political economy abandoning reflection on the role of culture in the economy and society, the subject was taken up by a group of humanist thinkers, poets, essayists, and artists themselves, united in a collective condemnation of what Thomas Love Peacock calls "the grocer's mind". In his view, the grocer's mind manifests itself in a love of order and material activity, and its corollary is a rejection of the arts. Beyond this rejection, their aim was to define the place of the arts and culture in an economy undergoing industrialization.

Contrary to political economy thinkers, Matthew Arnold put forward the idea that, far from being a matter of superfluity and leisure, the arts and culture were an essential means of warding off the dangers of antagonism between the growing population of workers and the owners of the means of production. Against a historical backdrop marked by the memory of the French Revolution and that of 1848, as well as by the continuing extension of the right to vote in the United Kingdom, Arnold considered that a more educated population, with a better conception of perfection and beauty, was less likely to indulge in the violent outbursts that marked the beginning of the nineteenth century. Here we find both an idea inherited from the Age of Enlightenment and a foreshadowing of later reflections on the conditions under which market allocation can work as well as the economists of the time thought.

While Arnold questioned the possibility of considering economic relations outside their cultural context, John Ruskin attacked another pillar of classical political economy: that of the stability of individuals' utility functions (in other words, their preferences). Rather than a society of abundance, Ruskin advocated a more authoritarian society, in which educated people could train others to choose and appreciate quality goods. In the vanguard of these trainers of taste, Ruskin placed the artist and art critic and was therefore a fervent advocate of public policies to support the arts and culture. Seldom read by the economists of his time, Ruskin had a major influence on the Anglo-Saxon labor movement as a whole, particularly through Henry Clay, who, in the final chapter of Economics: An Introduction to the General Reader, took up Ruskin's opposition between a nineteenth-century of material abundance but artistic poverty and periods (Antiquity, the Middle Ages) of great material poverty but great artistic wealth.

A third virulent critic of the treatment of the arts by the political thinking of his time was William Morris, who was both a businessman and an artist, leading the Arts & Crafts movement. More reserved than the previous two about the possibilities of reform, Morris was also more radical in his political views. He believed that only collective ownership of the means of production could ensure a rich artistic output. Not always clearly explained, Morris went further than Marx and his successors in considering the positive effects of socialism on the arts.

== Marginalist revolution ==
As had their predecessors, the founders of marginalism sought to construct general laws with as few exceptions as possible. As a result, the early texts of the neoclassical school make very little mention of the arts, except when they provide striking illustrations of a theory of value in which value is determined by demand. Unlike the previous generation, however, these economists were sensitive to the existence of beneficial externalities of the arts on society as a whole. Alfred Marshall, for example, saw the arts as a means of alleviating the discomfort of city life for the working class from the countryside. Moreover, the main authors of the first marginalist generation were themselves great lovers of art, and although none of their works devotes a chapter to the subject in its own right, reflections on the theme are scattered throughout their works, with varying degrees of success.

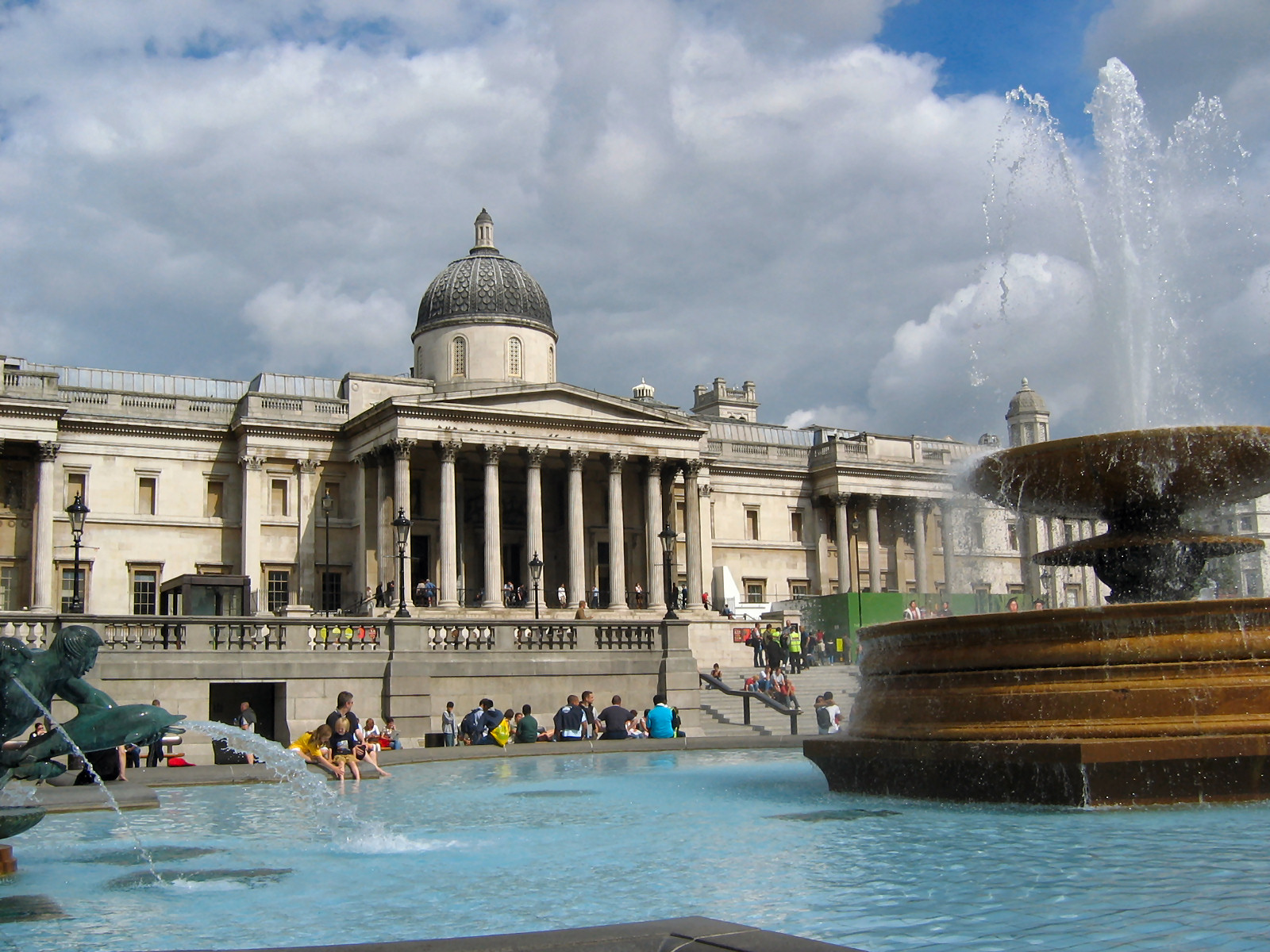
Convinced that great works of art are public property, Lionel Robbins played an important role in supporting London's major cultural institutions, such as the National Gallery.

William Jevons was undoubtedly the person who wrote most about the role of the arts in the neo-classical program. An artist and aesthete himself, he saw in the arts the possibility of enriching the lives of the whole population. However, in his view, the artistic experience could not be planned. As a result, people who have not received an early education in the arts underestimate the pleasure they will derive from it, which results in too low a demand for artistic goods on their part. Anticipating Becker and Murphy's theory of rational addiction by almost a century, (Note: Gary Becker and Kevin M. Murphy (1988). "A Theory of Rational Addiction", The Journal of Political Economy 96: 675–700.) Jevons described the artistic experience as an addictive consumption, separate in this sense from that of conventional goods. Although somewhat critical of the role of critics, Jevons believed that the cultural goods available to the working class should be carefully selected by enlightened members of the ruling class, in contrast to what he saw as a conspiracy to provide workers with only inferior cultural goods that did not contribute to their education in the fine arts. In this context, Jevons was one of the first economists to reflect on the role of museums in terms of popular education. He condemned the museums of his day, which lacked explanatory texts and were still often organized as vast cabinets of curiosities.

Although ardent defenders of consumer sovereignty, the marginalists nonetheless established a clear hierarchy of different goods and believed that the enrichment of populations naturally led them to consume cultural goods, once basic material comfort was assured.

Among the neo-classicists active on the subject before cultural economics became a subdivision in its own right in the 1960s, Lionel Robbins occupies a special place. An aspiring artist himself, he is best known for his work on behalf of Britain's major cultural institutions (Covent Garden, the Tate Gallery, and the National Gallery). Convinced of the public good nature of at least some major works, he also advocated public support for patronage. He admitted, however, that the tools of neo-classical economics at his disposal did not allow him to justify the exceptional treatment he demanded for the arts.

== The arts according to American economists ==
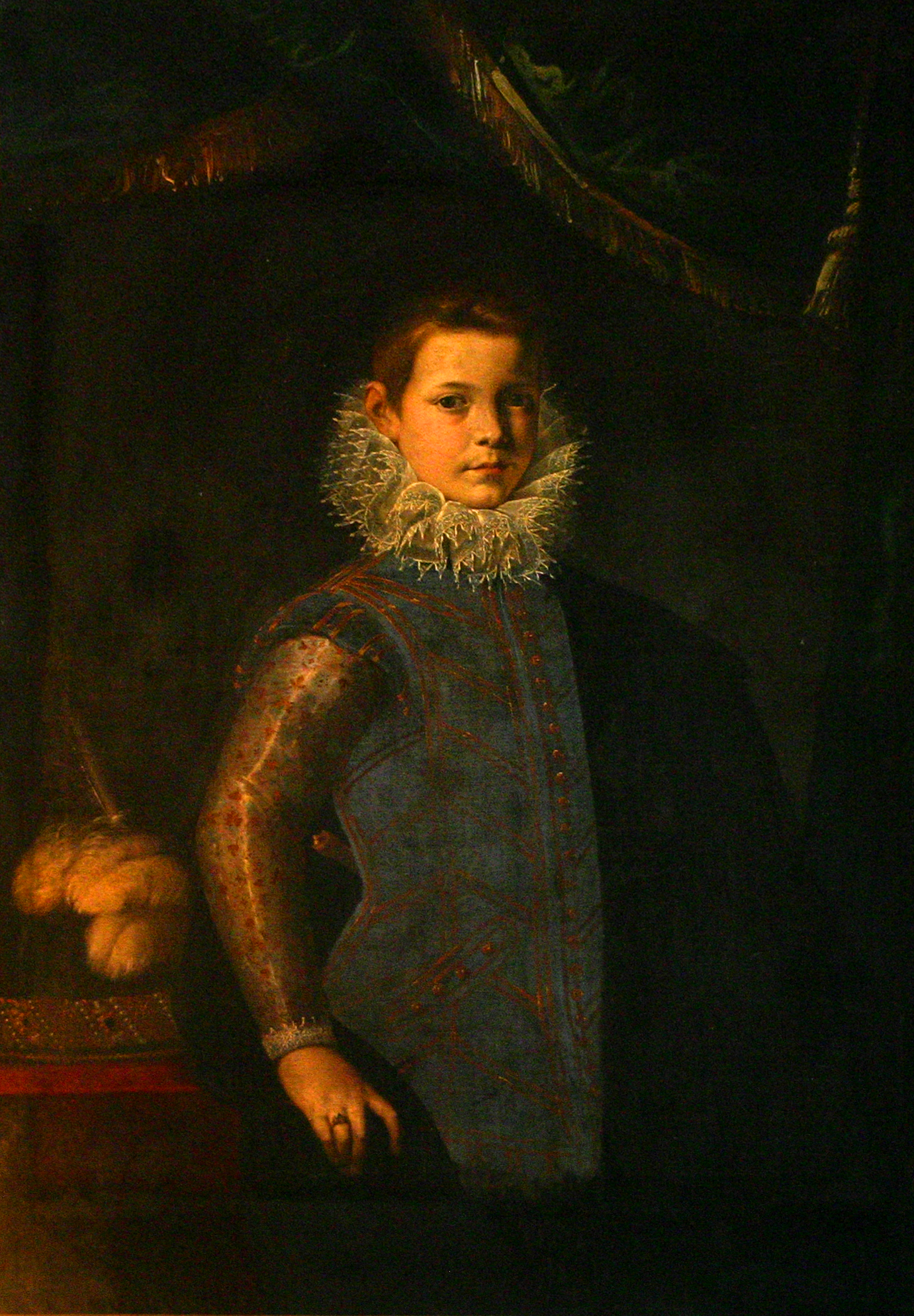
Cosimo de' Medici by Titian. Veblen saw such commissioned works as an illustration of conspicuous consumption.

Rejecting the utilitarianism of Bentham and the rational agent of the neo-classicists, American institutionalism proceeds from a more complex conception of human behavior and seeks to relate it to the organization of the economy. As a result, we would expect to find arguments highlighting the special character of the arts and the organization of the production of cultural goods. This subject, however, was not part of their research program, and their treatment of the arts differed little from that of previous generations.

For example, Veblen's treatment of the arts in his Theory of the Leisure Class revived the tone of seventeenth-century pamphlets. Seeing the works of the past essentially as a tool for the conspicuous consumption of the powerful of the day, he contrasts an aesthetic in which beauty is the expression of a generic or universal character with the pursuit of originality that is characteristic of the dynamic of conspicuous consumption. In this way, he relegated the arts to the same rank as all non-productive activities designed to demonstrate an individual's wealth through his or her ability to waste resources on activities with no social value.

Galbraith, on the other hand, showed a sustained interest in the arts. As early as the 1960s, he tried to launch a seminar on the economics of the arts at Harvard, but met with rejection from artists, who saw it as a deviation from their activity, and a lack of interest from economists. In the chapter entitled "The Market and the Arts" in his book Economic Science and the General Interest, he explains this lack of interest by referring to the anachronistic nature of creative processes. Originating with individuals or small groups who were quite frankly individualistic, artistic creation, right up to design, remained the work of small businesses with their own particular behavior, which set them apart from the technostructure that the economists of the time were trying to theorize.

== Keynes and the Bloomsbury Group ==
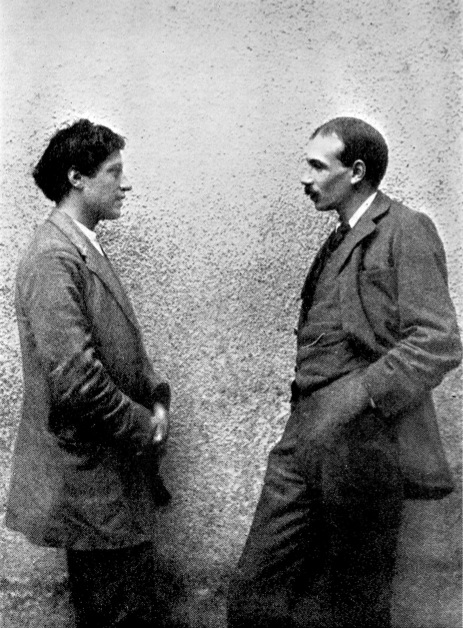
Keynes and Duncan Grant, two members of the Bloomsbury Group.

While some of the authors before him had been enthusiastic art lovers, no renowned economist spent as much time in contact with artists as Keynes, who spent most of his life in contact with the Bloomsbury Group. Although he did not personally devote any of his work to the economics of culture, it seems certain that his presence encouraged the other members of the group to think about the economic conditions of the production of cultural goods.

Going against the implicit hierarchy of goods set out in marginalist works, the members of the group considered that cultural goods were not luxury goods, but one of the fundamentals of all human civilization. Arguing on the basis of the high artistic quality of the primitive arts, they challenged the relationship between economic growth and artistic creativity.

Roger Fry and Clive Bell also challenged the application of utilitarianism to the artistic experience. For them, aesthetic experience is fundamentally different from the satisfaction of a biological need and, by extension, from the consumption of an ordinary material good. While this challenge did not lead to the formulation of an alternative theory of cultural consumption, it did have the merit of highlighting a specificity of cultural goods that Anglo-Saxon thinkers had neglected since the end of the eighteenth century.

All the members of the group also shared a fascination for how the artistic representation of mythical events was revealed, and in their view perpetuated perceptions and conditioning that helped to shape political and economic decisions. In this way, they linked the importance given to the Flood myth in artistic representations to the belief that a catastrophe or revolution must necessarily precede any fundamental improvement in the human condition. From Genesis to the 'Five Giants', (Note: Beredige personified the five main social problems that the welfare state had to remedy: Misery, Ignorance, Disease, Insalubrity and Unemployment in his Report to Parliament on Social Security and Related Benefits.) they identified multiple forms of this influence.

Personally involved in the art markets, the members of the group noted that, contrary to the classical analysis, price did not seem to be the essential determinant of the supply of cultural goods, with authors feeling driven more by inner necessities than by the prospect of gain. On the demand side, Fry followed a similar approach to Keynes in distinguishing between the various types of motivation in the demand for works of art. Like Keynes too, they were in favor of public intervention to support artistic demand, but only once all private alternatives had been exhausted.

Keynes's intervention was decisive for them in terms of public policy in favor of the arts and culture. Members of the group became involved in concrete actions, as evidenced by Fry's numerous lectures. Above all, they initiated cooperative or associative structures (Hogarth Press, The London Artists' Association) designed to provide a stable framework for artists prepared to abide by minimum rules in exchange for a more regular income and a guarantee of their creative freedom. In the private sector, one of their most important achievements was the Contemporary Art Society, which functioned as a certification authority for contemporary artists to educate public taste and reassure potential buyers about the quality of their purchases. This role was taken up, and indeed considerably extended, with the founding after World War II of the Arts Council of Great Britain, of which Keynes was one of the first directors.

== From marginal status to recognition ==
Regardless of the calibre of economists interested in culture, until the second half of the twentieth century it was never at the heart of any research program. Rather, it was seen as a marginal theme, of little importance in relation to the problems posed by the crisis of the 1930s, and then by the revival of the world economy.

The economy of culture emerged as its own subject from a series of works in the 1960s. The book Performing Arts-The Economic Dilemma by William Baumol and William Bowen, devoted to the economics of the performing arts, is widely regarded as the starting point for contemporary cultural economics, setting out a considerable research programme through a fairly pessimistic analysis of the sustainability of the performing arts. (Note: Benhamou, p. 3-5, Introduction.) The interest shown in cultural consumption also owes much to the work of Gary Becker on addictive goods, of which cultural goods are a positive example, as well as to the work of Alan T. Peacock, at the time director of the British Arts Council, and to that of public choice theory, which provided a basis for the idea of a market failure specific to the field of cultural goods. (Note: Benhamou, p. 3-5, Introduction.)

These various initial influences did not occur without tension between them. If, according to Baumol and Bowen, the performing arts have no future outside of heavily subsidised structures (Note: Baumol points out in the 1987 New Palgrave Dictionary of Economics that cost disease, which affects many sectors, is not a sufficient justification for the existence of such structures.) (this is a consequence of Baumol effect), the school of public choice strongly questions the ability of the institutions responsible for granting subsidies to do so efficiently and without capturing rents. At the same time, Becker's work provides a starting point for examining cultural consumption as the result of rational and maximizing behaviour, differing little from that which governs the consumption of all other goods. (Note: Benhamou, p. 3-5, Introduction.)

The growth of the cultural industries in terms of economic activity and their share within the economy, as well as the need to evaluate public policies on the arts and culture, has fuelled interest in this work. A specialized international journal, the Journal of Cultural Economics, was launched in 1977. (Note: Journal of Cultural Economics [archive], Springer US, ISSN 0885-2545 (printed) 1573–6997 (online)) In academic terms, recognition was definitively achieved in 1994 with the publication by David Throsby of a literature review in the Journal of Economic Literature, at the same time as this same journal introduced the classifications Z1 (cultural economics) and Z11 (arts economics) into its classification. Two handbooks reviewing the state of the literature were then produced, first by Ruth Towse in 2003, (Note: See A Handbook of Cultural Economics) and then by Victor Ginsburgh and David Throsby. (Note: See Handbook of the Economics of Art and Culture.) In the introduction to this work, David Throsby notes that the economics of culture currently makes extensive use of neoclassical tools for analysing demand and well-being, as well as tools for the macroeconomic evaluation of public policies. Concepts from public choice theory and political economy also feature prominently in the study of policy design, while institutional economics is used to study the influence of production structures on behaviour. Relying on a literature review by Ruth Towse, (Note: See A Handbook of Cultural Economics) he notes the influence of the economic analysis of law stemming from the work of Ronald Coase for the study of transaction costs and intellectual property problems. Finally, he notes that in the field of cultural economics, applications of industrial economics remain under-represented.

== Historical challenges and the contemporary culture economics ==
The panorama of the field of cultural economics as it is defined at the beginning of the 21st century can be seen in the table of contents of the Handbook of the Economics of Art and Culture. The problem of the value of cultural goods continues to be an important subject of reflection. While the neoclassical theory of value, determined solely by the match between supply and demand, accounts for the price of certain works of art, the measurement of the value of a work of art for society as a whole remains an open question. The role of the arts, culture and, more generally, cultural norms, which was at the heart of economic thinking on the arts and culture until the mid-twentieth century, has gradually been emancipated, becoming a sub-field of economics in its own right. On the other hand, the preoccupation with the public policies of the arts and culture remains a major subject within the field, (Note: The section of the handbook devoted to these subjects is the longest, and regulatory issues are also addressed in many other chapters.) to which contemporary approaches in terms of international trade and geographical economics have been added.

Similarly, the economics of artists' work constitutes a pivotal point between historical thought and the economics of modern culture: while the central questions of resource allocation posed by the contrast between the considerable earnings of a few stars and the modesty of average artistic remuneration remain the same, the tools of labor market analysis in terms of supply, demand, human capital, and asymmetric information are now used to answer them. The study of the economic consequences of legislative frameworks, in particular intellectual and artistic property, has taken on increasing importance in the economics of culture, under the influence of the economic analysis of law, a dimension rarely present in economic thought before Ronald Coase. Finally, a large part of the contemporary cultural economics approach is to take account of the reputed particularism of the arts and culture by showing the extent to which the common tools of economics can be applied to account for the functioning of the corresponding markets, whether in terms of supply and demand, contractual relations within the various cultural industries or auctions.

== Appendix ==
=== Bibliography ===
- Victor Ginsburgh, David Throsby, Handbook of the Economics of Art and Culture, vol. 1, Amsterdam/Boston Mass., North-Holland, coll. "Handbooks", November 11, 2006, 1400 p. (ISBN 978-0-444-50870-6), 2: History, "Chapter 2: Art and culture in the history of economic thought", p. 25–68
- V. A. Ginsburgh, David Throsby, Handbook of the Economics of Art and Culture, vol. 1, 1: Introduction, "Chapter 1: Introduction and Overview", p. 3–22
- Ruth Towse, A Handbook of Cultural Economics, Edward Elgar, 2003, 494 p. (ISBN 978-1-84064-338-1)
- Françoise Benhamou, L'Économie de la culture, Paris, La Découverte, coll. "Repères", 2004 (5th ed.), 123 p. (ISBN 2-7071-4410-X, read online archive) (in French)

=== Related articles ===
- For a presentation of the field itself: Cultural economics
- For an overview of the schools of thought cited: History of economic thought
- Schools of thought: Mercantilism, Classical economics, Marxism, Neoclassical school, Institutionalism, Keynesianism, Public choice theory.
- Economic theory of museums
