= Economic theory of museums =

Subfield of cultural economics concerned with the economic implications of museums

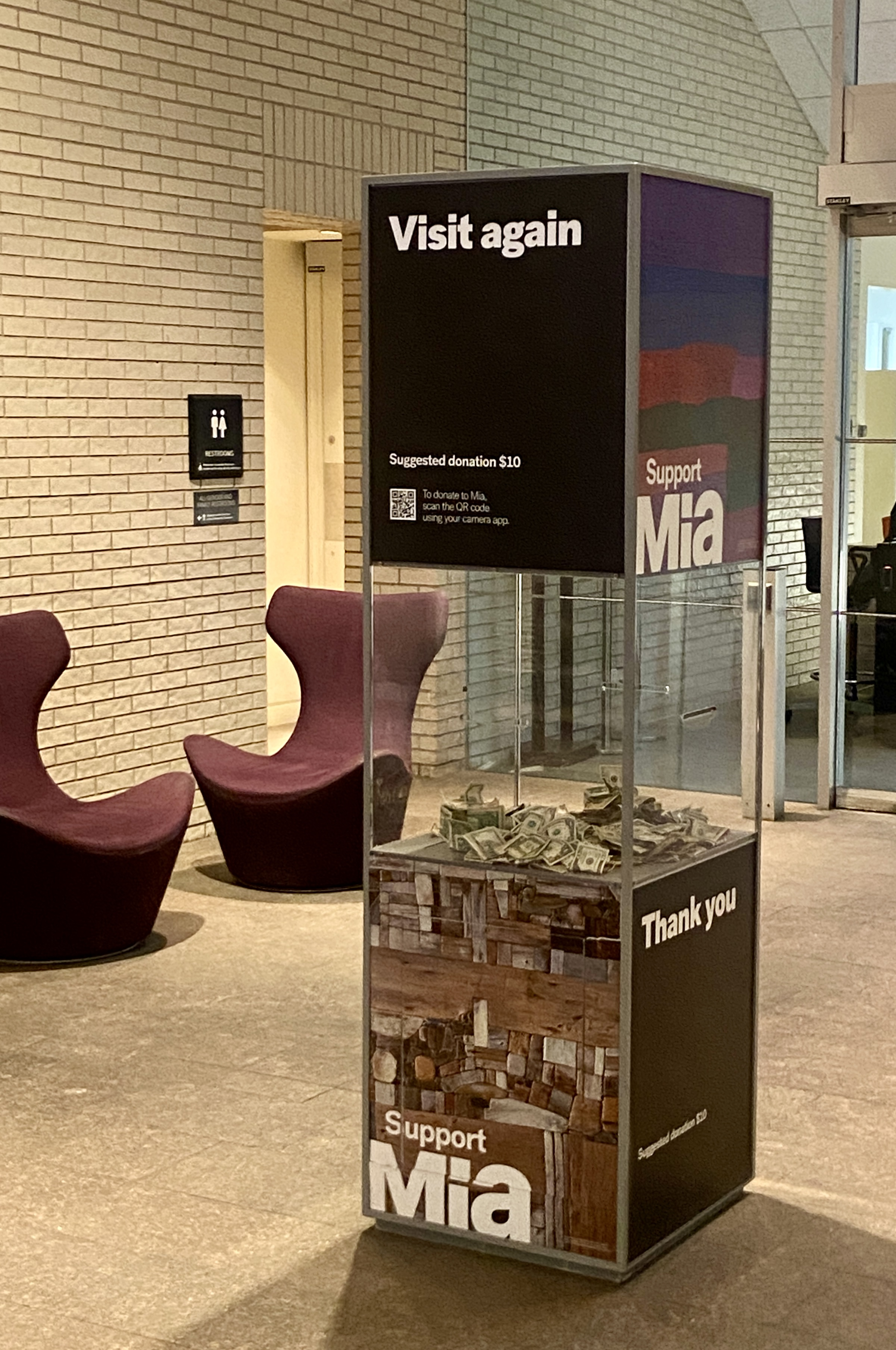
Donation kiosk at the Minneapolis Institute of Arts

The economic theory of museums is a field of cultural economics that focuses on the economic functioning of museums.

More specifically, the economic theory of museums mainly analyzes museum activity within two frameworks. Firstly, a museum can be considered as an economic unit (like a business), viewed from the angle of the relationship between its inputs (collections, budget, employees) and its output (sales, exhibitions, media presence, scientific publications). Within this framework, the effect of museums on other sectors can also be studied in terms of employment or sales generated. Secondly, it can be studied as a neoclassical economic (Note: Frey and Meier, in the Handbook (p. 1020), point out that in the case of museums, agents are often not totally rational, adopting overtly altruistic or prosocial behaviors.)[nb 1] agent maximizing an objective under a constraint of allocation of scarce resources.

The economic analysis of museums highlights the fundamental impact of financing methods (subsidies, own resources, donations) on museum policy in terms of collection management, artistic orientation (towards the general public or connoisseurs) and the implementation of activities designed to increase resources.

Since the 1980s the number of museums has risen sharply, and a star system has emerged for museums located in touristic destinations, housed in spectacular buildings and boasting world-famous works in their collections. These museums are attracting a growing share of visitors, while other museums, though increasingly numerous, are seeing their attendance decline.

Like the rest of cultural economics, the economic theory of museums is a relatively recent branch of economics. In fact, economic analysis only began to be applied to museums in the 1980s, as the number of museums multiplied and trade-offs were made necessary by the climate of budgetary austerity that called into question public subsidies in all fields, and particularly in culture.

== Overview ==
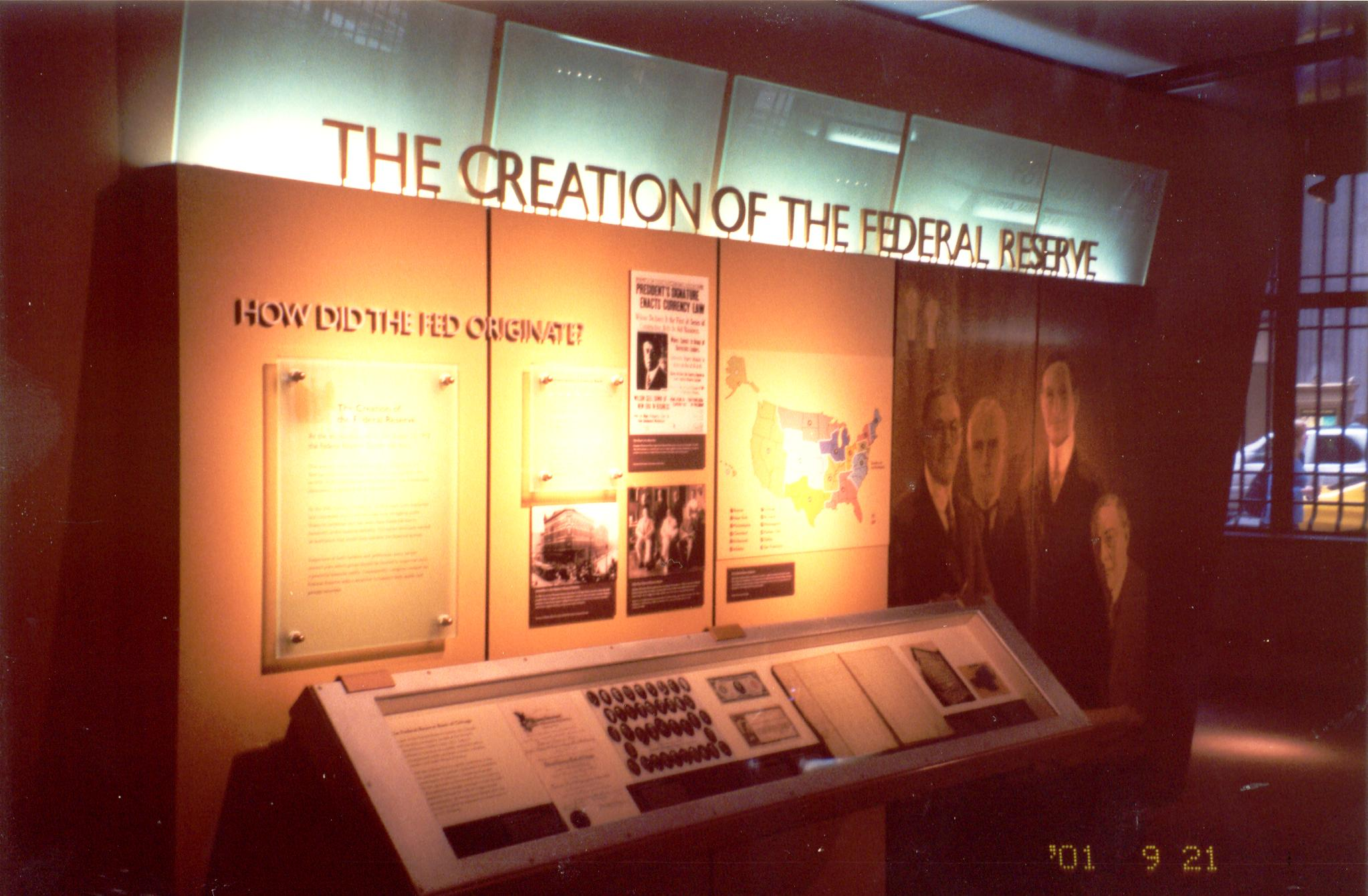
An exhibit in the Money Museum at the Federal Reserve Bank of Chicago.

The economic study of museums emerged as a distinct field in the 1980s, a period marked by the rapid growth in the number of museums and increased financial pressures resulting from economic downturns. Prior to the early 19th century, museums were primarily accessible to apprentice artists who used these institutions to study and replicate established artworks. Although museums began to embrace educational roles around 1880, the process of opening their doors to the general public was gradual and often resisted by professionals who maintained an elitist view of the museum’s purpose.

Historically, museum funding was closely tied to their function of preserving artistic and cultural heritage. This focus remained largely unchallenged until public funding began to decline and operational costs increased, partly due to the Baumol effect—a phenomenon where costs rise even if productivity remains unchanged. These financial challenges led to renewed debates about the economic justification for maintaining museums and strategies for their long-term sustainability.

Museums today encompass a variety of types, including history museums, art museums, science and technology museums. Regardless of type, all museums face the ongoing challenge of balancing the preservation of their collections and educational missions with the professional ambitions of museum managers. In the 1990s, science and technology museums generally experienced fewer difficulties in securing funding and public support compared to art museums, resulting in a greater focus of academic research on the latter.

The economic analysis of museums addresses several key questions. It explores the underlying reasons for the existence of museums, the motivations for both establishing and visiting these institutions, and the factors influencing these decisions. Additionally, it examines the unique characteristics of the modern museum sector. This includes an analysis of the costs associated with running museums, focusing on the relationship between financial and human resources and the delivery of services such as conservation, documentation, and exhibitions. The analysis also considers the number and variety of museums in existence. Central to the discussion are issues related to collection management and pricing policies. Recent trends indicate a concentration of visitors and resources in a small number of prominent museums and exhibitions, highlighting shifts in public interest and funding within the sector.

== Typology of demand in museums ==
Art museums often originate from institutions or collections established in the early 20th century or before. The establishment of newer museums is usually motivated by scientific or regional development needs, not by economic factors alone. The analysis of demand for museum services assumes the presence of a museum. Demand for museum services arises from individuals interested in the collections and from those who benefit economically from the museum’s activities

=== Private demand ===
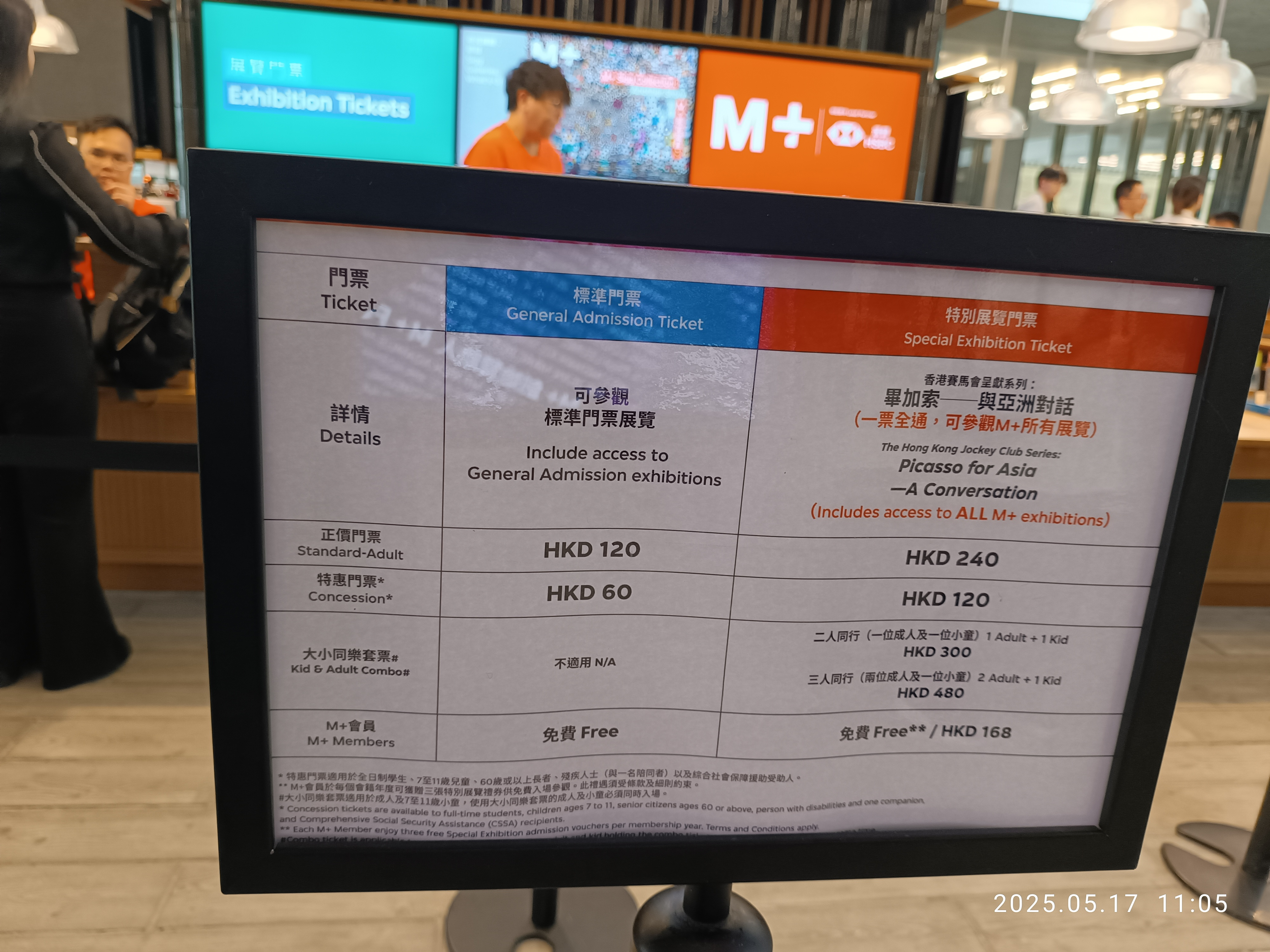
Museum admission ticket fees

The largest component of private demand depends on the entrance ticket price, the opportunity cost of time spent visiting, and the price of alternative activities.

==== Ticket price ====
Econometric studies, often conducted on a limited number of museums, indicate that the price elasticity of admissions (the drop in admissions generated by an increase in ticket price) is very low (between 0 and −0.5). This means that an increase in ticket price leads to a small decline in the number of visitors. This pattern is more evident in art museums, while science and history museums show greater sensitivity due to the presence of more competing activities nearby. As a result, some museums can generate significant revenue from admission fees without a large decrease in attendance. However, ticket sales account for only a small portion of total revenue, as seen in the 150 largest museums in the United States, where ticket sales make up about 5% of revenue.

Since these findings are based on price changes, evaluating the effects of moving from paid to free admission requires different methods, which are relevant to museum pricing policies.

==== Visitor opportunity cost and revenue sensitivity ====
Income sensitivity of museum visits is a subject of public policy, as it helps determine if subsidies benefit higher-income groups more than lower-income groups. The relationship is ambiguous. Income is closely linked to education level, which influences visitation rates. Higher income also means a higher opportunity cost for time spent visiting. Individuals with higher incomes may be more likely to visit museums due to higher education, but less likely because the cost of their time is greater. Income elasticity is higher for museums that require more specialized knowledge, such as contemporary art museums, which suggests that income acts as a proxy for human capital. For people with similar education levels, income itself is not a primary factor in museum attendance.

==== Pricing of alternative or complementary activities ====
For visitors who do not live near a museum, the decision to visit a specific museum depends on the comparison of all related costs, including transportation, lodging, and meals, with those of other activities. In Scotland, one study estimates that these additional costs account for over 80% of the total cost of a museum visit.

=== Social demand ===
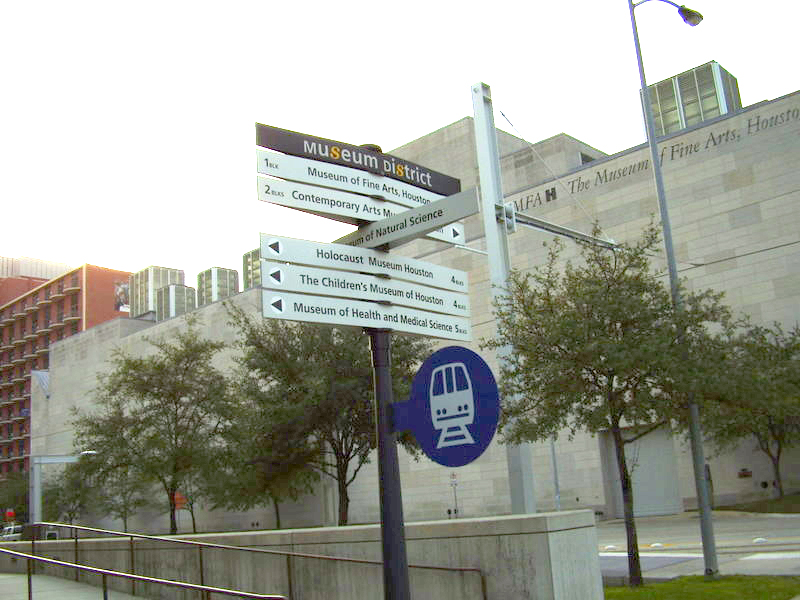
Houston Museum District, Houston Texas

The existence of a museum produces externalities for both those whose economic activity is not directly related to the museum and those whose activity is linked to it. Society benefits from improved knowledge of artistic or technical heritage. Museums also generate visitor flows that support local businesses and enhance the reputation of the location.

==== Social externalities ====
Museums illustrate the multiple externalities of cultural goods. Non-visitors benefit from the option to visit in the future (option value), from the preservation of works for future generations (bequest value), from the existence of preserved objects (existence value), from the prestige associated with the museum, and from its role in education and cultural identity. These effects are difficult to measure, but studies using contingent valuation, changes in real estate prices near museums, or natural experiments suggest these values are significant.

==== Private externalities ====
Private externalities refer to the direct economic effects of museums on the profits of businesses connected to them. These effects are often used to justify the existence of museums. However, the main function of a museum is to preserve collections and provide public access. Local economic stimulation can sometimes be achieved at a lower cost through other means than through museum institutions.

== The offer: costs and organization ==
=== Cost structure ===
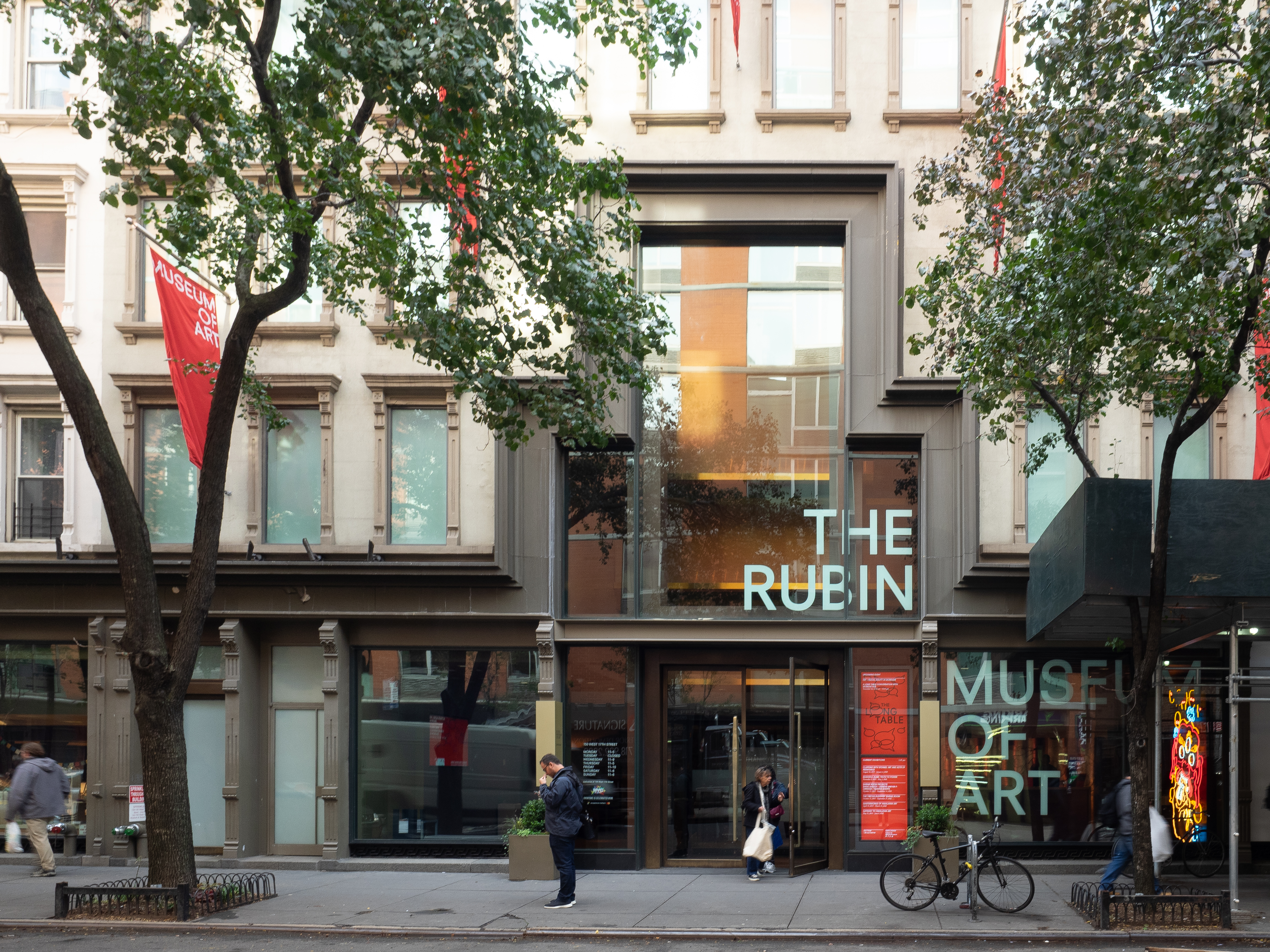
Rubin Museum of Art in New York City closed in 2024 due to a combination of financial struggles, and a shift towards a decentralized "museum without walls" model.

Museums have a cost structure that differs significantly from that of most companies in the service sector. Their large buildings, usually located in the heart of major conurbations, a large collection with little or no transferability, as well as insurance, security, and personnel costs, represent significant fixed costs. On the contrary, the marginal cost of an additional visitor is close to zero, (Note: This is the additional expense a museum faces when an extra visitor arrives. As the main expenses (upkeep of works of art and premises, surveillance, cleaning) are already paid, an additional visitor entails only minimal extra expenditure.) except when there is crowding around certain artworks (such as the Mona Lisa at the Louvre) or during very popular temporary exhibitions. The results of an empirical study on the subject confirm the existence of economies of scale below the threshold of around 100,000 visitors per year, with the average cost only increasing above this number of annual visitors. However, too few studies on the subject are available to give any real general validity to these thresholds.

Moreover, like most players in the cultural sector, museums are subject to a form of Baumol effect. The cost of maintaining and preserving their heritage increases at the same rate as the wages paid to a qualified workforce. With the exception of the construction of new buildings, this problem seems to be offset in the case of museums by productivity gains linked to the reduction of low-skilled jobs (camera surveillance), the dissemination of images of collections online, (Note: This enables additional works to be exhibited when the available physical space is saturated.) the use of volunteers and the development of other related products based on the best-known exhibitions or works.

However, museum governance systems often separate investment decisions from those setting the operating budget. As a result, allocated budgets do not take into account the need to make provisions for major works or new buildings (the notion of accounting depreciation), and more often than not underestimate the cost of maintaining architecturally daring buildings, as well as the real cost of organizing temporary exhibitions (sometimes financed at the expense of core conservation and research activities).

=== Opportunity costs and collection management ===
The most distinctive element of a museum's cost function is the potential value of its collection. A work of art in a museum's reserves represents a significant opportunity cost. It could be sold to finance the museum itself or to buy other works on the market. There is therefore a trade-off between the desire to sell works to fill gaps in a museum's collection and the museum's role in preserving its heritage. To avoid placing the burden of this trade-off solely on the museum's management, most museums do not include the market value of their collections in their balance sheets, and sales of works are governed by highly restrictive statutes.

=== The proliferation of museums ===
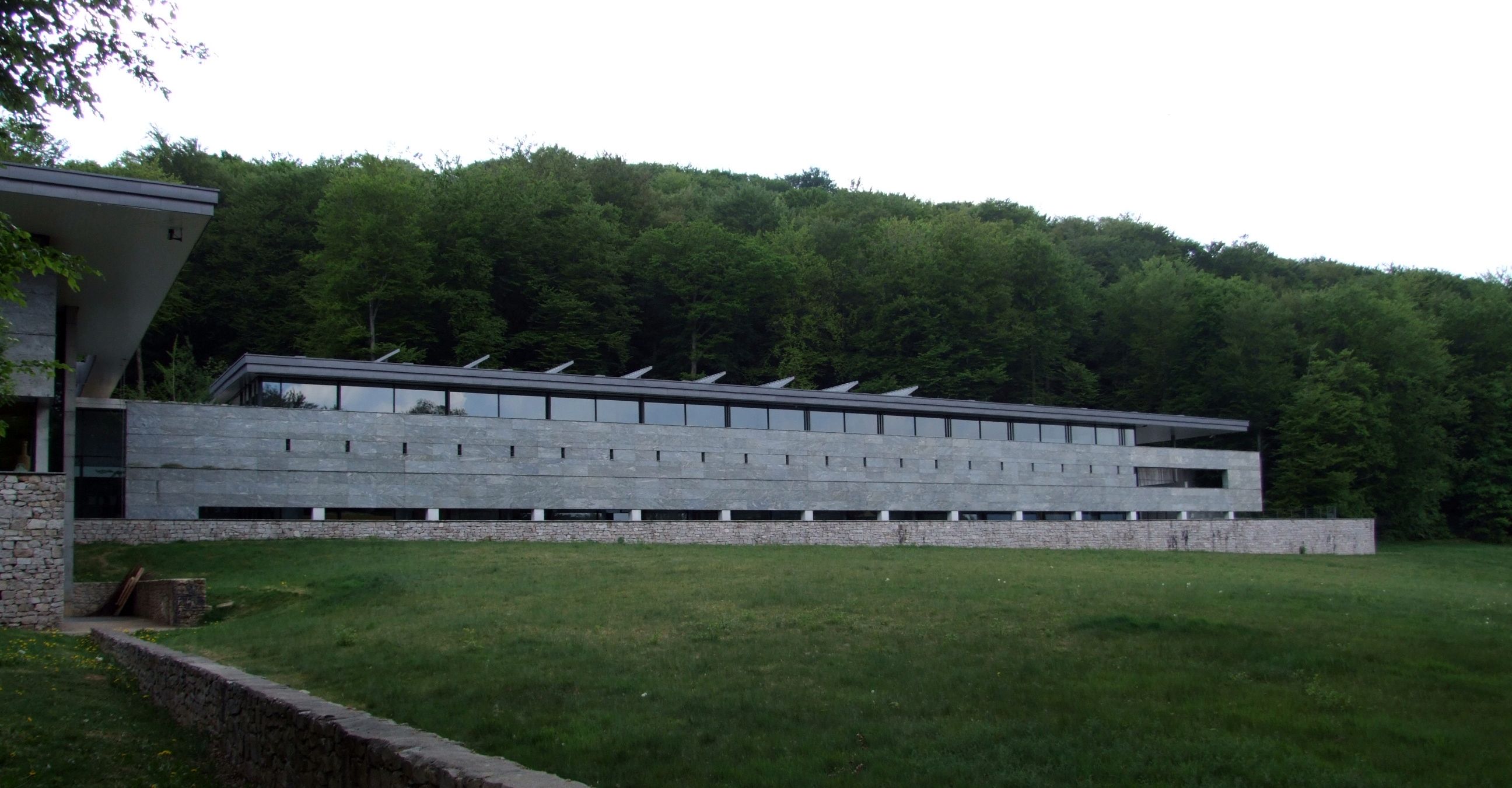
The Musée de Bibracte, at the base of Mont Beuvray (France), is one of a number of museums founded at the end of the 20th century on an archaeological site,

Two instruments are most often used to assess the success of museums: the total number of visitors and the ratio between the number of visits and the total population. (Note: This last indicator should be treated with caution, since the same individual may visit several museums, or the same museum several times; see F. Benhamou, Les Dérèglements de l'exception culturelle, Seuil, 2006.) According to these tools, museum attendance has increased considerably since the 1970s in developed countries. French national museums welcomed 14 million visitors (including 10 million paying visitors) in 2000, while in the United States, the ratio of visits and population rose from 22.1% in 1979 to 87.3% in 1993.

This increase in visitor numbers is linked to an upsurge in the number of museums on offer, as museum openings and renovations multiplied from the 1980s onwards. In Japan, three hundred new museums were opened in 15 years. Europe has witnessed an increase in exhibition space, complete reorganization, and even the opening of new facilities as part of urban renewal plans (Museum Island, Tate Modern).

== Collection management ==
=== Collection origins ===
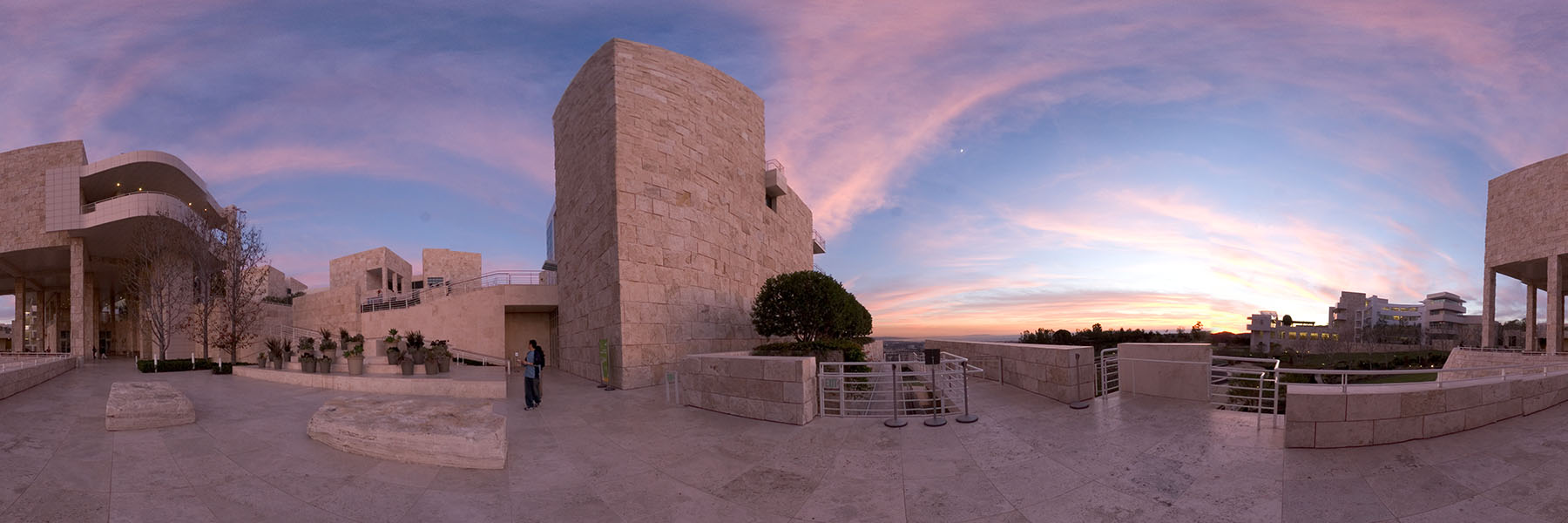
The Getty Center, founded with the bequest of American oil magnate Jean Paul Getty in Los Angeles.

In the United States, some of the major collections, along with their buildings, initial funds and objectives, originated with a single collector (Solomon R. Guggenheim, William Wilson Corcoran, Jean Paul Getty, etc.). However, major museums (Metropolitan Museum of Art, Boston Museum of Fine Arts) are the result of large groups of individuals (a thousand donors for the Boston Museum's initial $260,000) willing to entrust financial resources and broad autonomy to a management committee. The Metropolitan, for example, took full advantage of the Franco-Prussian War of 1870 to buy old paintings at low prices. The National Gallery of Art and the Museum of Modern Art, for their part, derive from the desire of collectors (Andrew Mellon in the case of the National Gallery) to build up quality collections by aggregating private collections, and, in the case of MoMA, to use the museum to defend and illustrate the art forms they wished to promote.

The artistic or financial value attributed to a work or a movement can vary greatly over time. For example, the sale of the "pompiers" paintings, considered of no interest, (Note: After being regarded as lacking in originality and artistic quality by the Impressionists and their successors, academic painting was re-evaluated in the 1980s and 1990s.) greatly impoverished the future collections of the Musée d'Orsay. As a result, curators are much more inclined to keep works in reserve which, for lack of interest and space, cannot be shown. As a result, only a small fraction of the collection is exhibited – half on average in the United States, and less than 5% (at the extreme) at the Centre Pompidou.

=== The role of museums ===
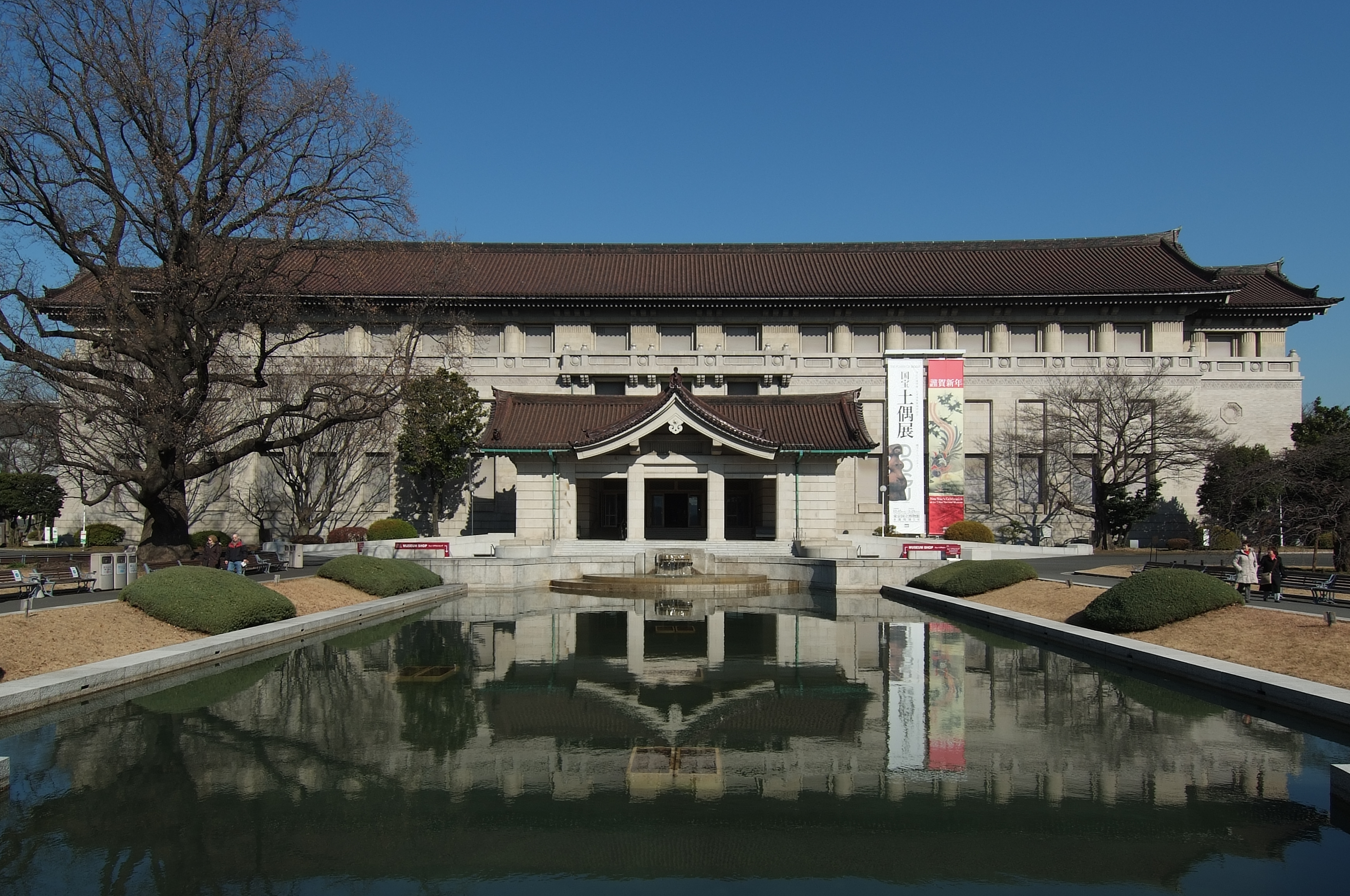
The Tokyo National Museum, the first museum to be created in Japan, in 1872, as an extension of the Ministry of Education, on the basis of imperial collections.

Most museums take the form of a non-profit organization, whether operated as a foundation or as a particular type of government agency. Their objectives are therefore less clear-cut than those of a company and are subject to negotiation between stakeholders. While the initial aim of nineteenth-century museums was to replace cabinets of curiosities with systematically organized and properly documented collections, today's museums seek to fulfill two contradictory roles: a didactic one and a preservation one. The didactic role is to display the most representative pieces of the various artistic movements, to show the relationships between these movements, and to enlighten the visitor with extensive documentation. The preservation role, which gives the museum a sacramental dimension, emphasizes the need to preserve works of art for future generations, and to present them as they are, to encourage visitors not to see them as the product of an era, but to consider them from the point of view of pure aesthetics. The first role implies making large, well-documented exhibitions, always showing the most important and famous pieces. The need for preservation, on the other hand, encourages us to keep the most important pieces in reserve as much as possible, so as to reserve them for the work of the specialist, and to exhibit the lesser-known pieces so as to allow visitors to abstract themselves from their preconceived ideas about the type of work under consideration.

Richard Caves explains the relative dominance of the second aspect over the first, both by the training and selection of collection directors and by the ability of a conservation and exhibition policy aimed solely at connoisseurs to attract donations of important works, which are an essential element in the improvement of museum collections. Similarly, spectacular acquisitions attract not only the public, but also funds to finance building projects that are a fitting showcase for their private collections (the Guggenheim Foundation's museum series is a case in point).

However (see pricing policy below), the pressure to open up to as many people as possible, whether to attract donations or to justify themselves to the public funding, encourages directors to offer regular temporary exhibitions featuring famous works and recognized artists, to attract a large audience. As a result, the contrast between a permanent collection focused on showcasing rare pieces for connoisseurs, and a few particularly famous pieces, highlighted on a permanent basis (such as the Mona Lisa at the Louvre) or on a temporary basis as part of highly publicized exhibitions, is growing.

=== Museum budgets and management ===
The financing structure of museums varies widely from continent to continent, even within the largest museums. For example, 56.2% of the Louvre's 2001 budget came from subsidies, whereas in 1988, this proportion for major American museums was 33.6%, supplemented by their own revenues (18%), investment income (14.1%) and a significant proportion of private contributions (34.3%).

From an institutionalist perspective, the interests of museum directors need to be considered. These interests naturally include their remuneration, but also the esteem and admiration in which they are held by their reference group (art lovers and other members of their profession), their working conditions, and job security. These objectives have no a priori reason to be aligned with the objectives set for the museum they manage, whether by a foundation charter or by public authorities. As a result, differences in institutional structure can be expected to alter the constraints on museum management, leading to different behaviors in terms of collections management, visitor numbers and revenue sources.

==== Public museums ====
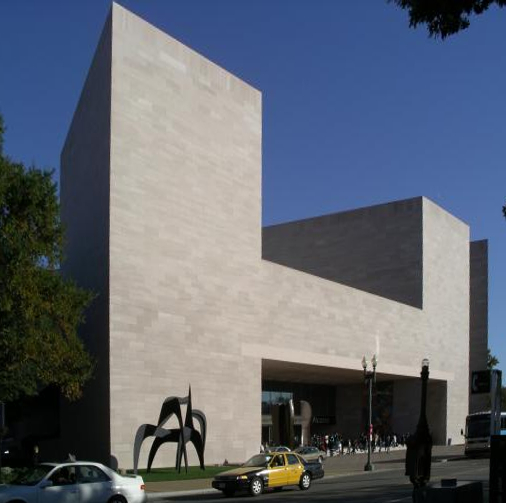
The National Gallery of Art in Washington, administered by the U.S. federal government.

The finances of a public museum come almost exclusively from public subsidies, either from the State or from local authorities (60% of French museums are in this category). As in most public accounting systems, any profits generated by an establishment do not belong to it, and are returned to the community budget, managers of a public museum have very little incentive to generate additional income or limit operating costs, especially as D. Maddison's study of a sample of British museums shows that an increase in a museum's own income almost always leads to a corresponding reduction in public subsidies. As a result, the managers of these museums are emphasizing non-commercial aspects, in terms of artistic, scientific or historical contributions.

Public museums are not expected to sell items from their collections due to the inability to appropriate the proceeds. The collection policy is geared towards connoisseurs with minimal educational apparatus, and related sources of income such as museum stores and restaurants are often overlooked. Visitor numbers or paid admissions are not considered an objective. However, this theoretical prediction, which is based on the weakness of the direct economic incentive emanating from visitors, should not obscure other incentives or constraints that are specific to public museums. In fact, in a financial context that encourages them to control spending, many public funders make their subsidies conditional on the pursuit of more or less formalized objectives. This encourages or forces museums to meet the demands of visitors (current and potential) and taxpayers. For instance, the Louvre is a publicly-funded institution that operates under a performance contract mandating the promotion of access for all audiences. Likewise, a museum that receives funding from a local authority often seeks to encourage visits by school groups from the area and to showcase the vibrancy of local cultural life in its communications.

==== Private museums ====
Private museums depend primarily on admission revenues and related income (museum shops, restaurants). In the United States, half of all museums are of this type. Their objective is to maximize their revenues. This policy frequently involves resorting to the art market to sell off pieces that don't fit in with the collection and using the proceeds of such sales to buy pieces that are consistent with the installed collection. Great attention is also expected to be paid to secondary sources of income, for example through the possibility of renting out premises for non-art events. Similarly, these museums are more inclined to organize exhibitions that attract large numbers of visitors, using well-known works accompanied by a rich didactic apparatus.

==== Non-profit organizations ====
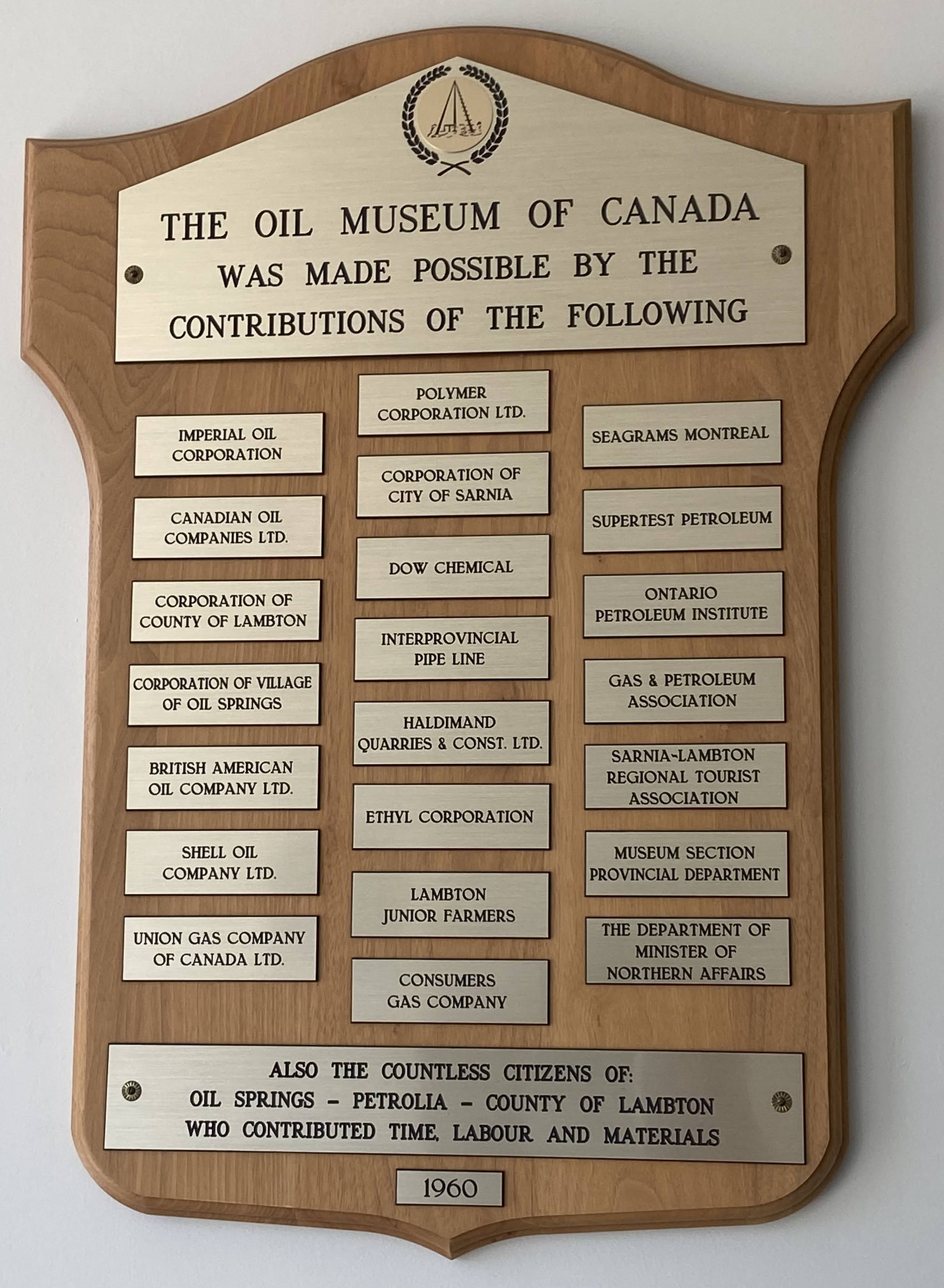
The Oil Museum of Canada Donor List

These museums are covered by different statutes depending on the country, being considered non-profit in the US and charities in the UK. They often benefit from tax reduction measures for their patrons. Their main objectives are to adopt an access policy that justifies the tax deduction, such as reducing ticket prices to avoid making a profit, and a display policy that encourages donations.

Donations can be both financial and charitable. In the first case, donations are matched by a display policy, with a hierarchical system of status ("donor", "benefactor", etc.) and a role in the museum's policy. Donations of works of art are more complex. Museums are often obliged to accept a range of donations of heterogeneous quality, without having the option of selling or not exhibiting the least interesting pieces, which imposes very heavy costs (both direct and opportunity).

==== Small museums ====
The economic theory of small museums differs from that of large museums in several important ways. Small museums operate with limited budgets and staff. They must balance revenue and expenses, often without the benefit of economies of scale. Because they have fewer visitors, they cannot spread fixed costs across many people. This makes it harder for them to achieve cost savings. Small museums rely on local funding, grants, donations, and some earned income. Their financial health depends on these sources, and any change can have a strong effect. Large museums, on the other hand, benefit from economies of scale. They can spread their fixed costs over a larger number of visitors, which lowers the average cost per visitor. Large museums have more diverse revenue streams, including endowments, major donors, ticket sales, and sponsorships. Their size allows them to attract more funding and to weather financial changes with more stability.

Small museums are closely tied to their local communities. Staff often take on many roles and work together to keep the museum running. They can change direction or try new things more quickly because their organizations are less complex. Large museums serve broader audiences and often have more rules and steps for making decisions. This structure can slow down changes and reduce direct contact between staff and visitors.

=== Museums and art markets ===
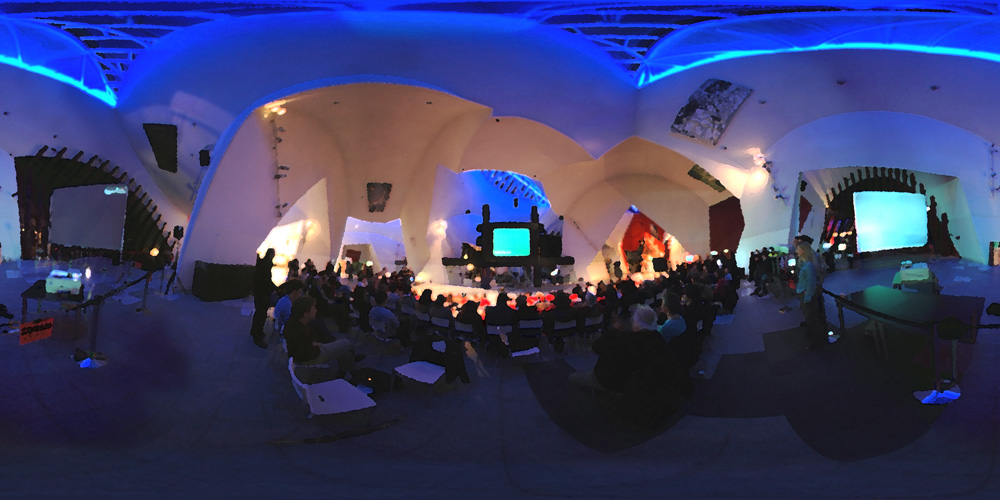
Showcase of emerging artists, ANU Centre for New Media, National Museum of Australia

Due to statutory restrictions or the fear of depriving themselves of works that could be of renewed interest, many museums refuse to sell works from their collections. Similarly, their resources only allow them to make rare (and often high-profile) purchases of recognized works, except in the case of contemporary art museums which may wish to buy very recent works before the popularity of a promising artist renders his or her work inaccessible. As a result, museums have only a limited direct impact on the art market. On the other hand, they do have a strong indirect impact as a certifying authority: artists exhibited in a museum are a safe option, lowering the risk premium on their work and driving up demand and prices for their output.

For similar reasons, major museums are hostile to a price system to govern the temporary transfers of works required for thematic exhibitions. They prefer a system of mutual exchange, with the circulation of the resulting exhibition as a quid pro quo. A notable exception to this non-market system, which saves potentially heavy transaction costs, is Russian museums, whose chronic lack of funds justifies special treatment in the eyes of their colleagues.

== Pricing policy ==
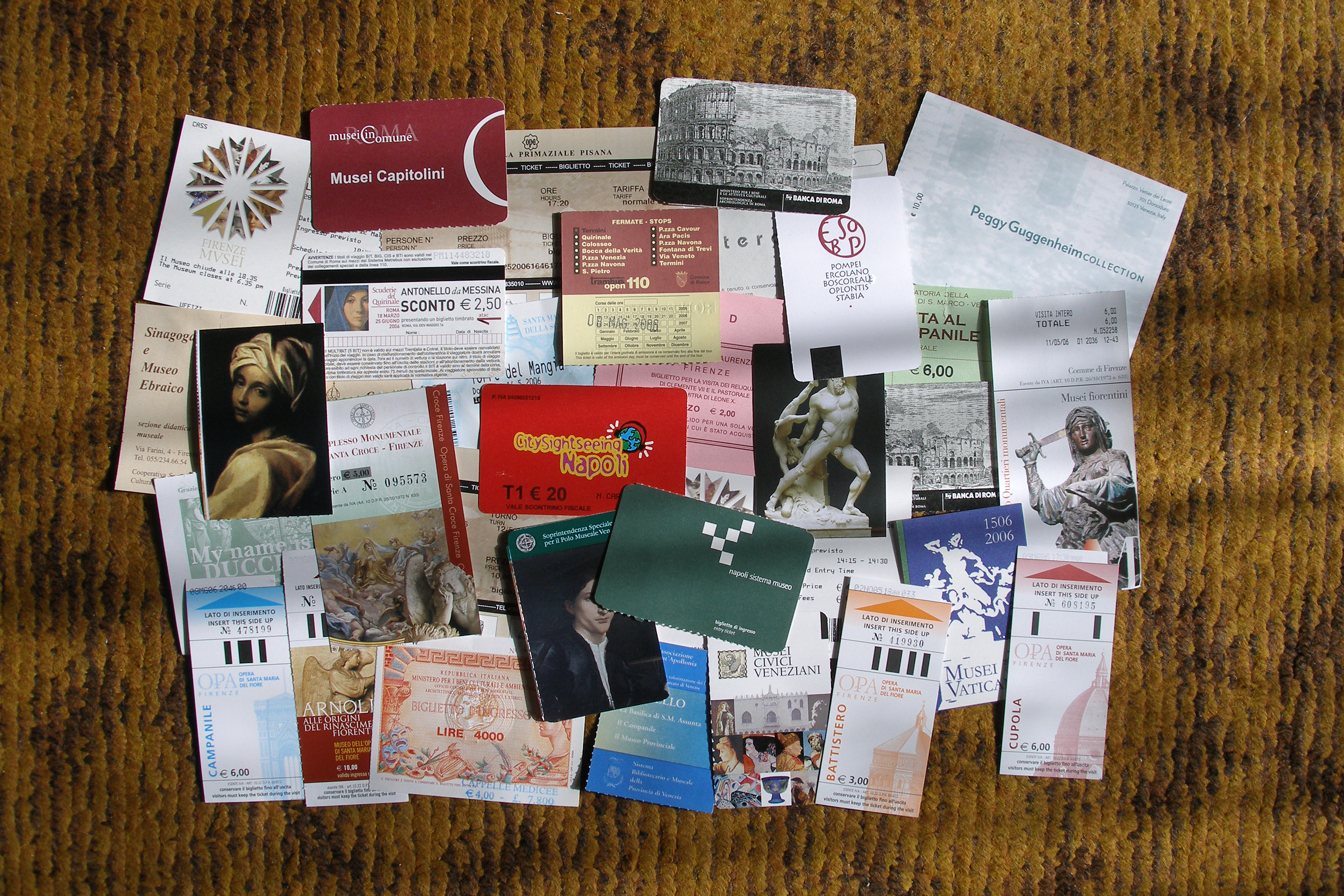
Museum tickets, Bologna, Italy

Under a certain number of visitors, the marginal cost of an additional visitor is negligible compared to the cost of preserving the collection. Thus, asking each visitor to pay an amount corresponding to the average cost of the museum would exclude many potential visitors with a low willingness to pay for an additional visit. As a result, most museums have a pricing policy based on price discrimination between occasional visitors, who often have a high willingness to pay (if a visit to the museum is an essential part of a holiday in the city concerned, for example), and potentially more regular visitors, whose number of visits depends on the cost of the additional visit. In most cases, this policy takes the form of a two-part tariff structure, with a single ticket on the one hand, and a subscription offering unlimited access to all or part of the museum's collections on the other.

Museums have historically depended on public authorities or wealthy patrons to fund their operating costs, in addition to income from admission fees. However, since the mid-1980s, public subsidies have decreased due to budgetary constraints, while museum costs have increased due to the rising sophistication of preservation techniques and the high cost of building maintenance. Meanwhile, sponsorship is increasingly focused on supporting operations such as building construction, performances, and temporary exhibitions that provide a showcase. Consequently, museums that rely primarily on their own resources have turned to accepting modest and numerous donations in exchange for a policy of openness to as many people as possible.

=== Free access issue ===
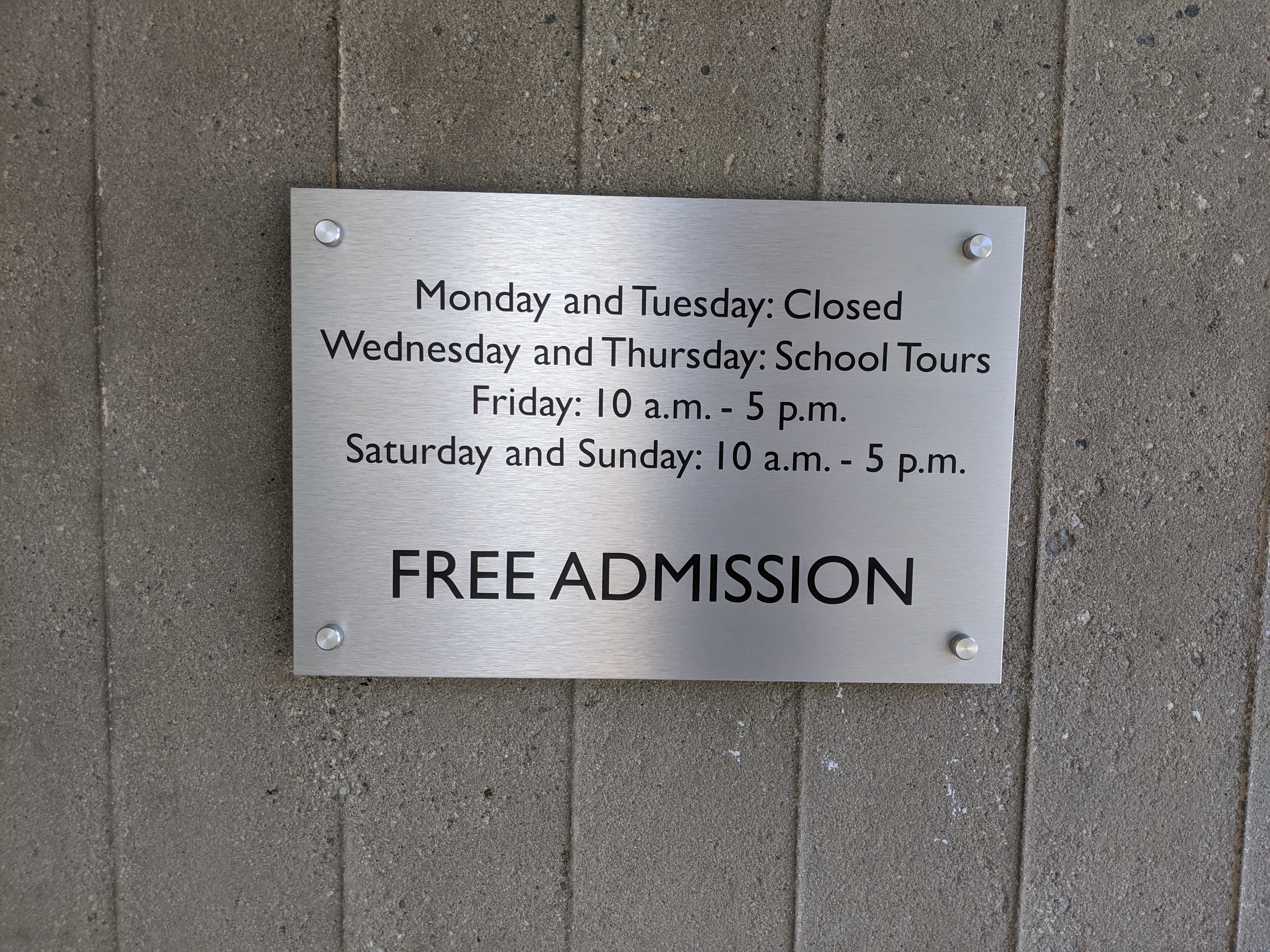
Free admission sign

The discussion of free admission to museums goes back at least as far as Hans Sloane, whose donation in 1753 was the foundation of the British Museum. It was accompanied by the explicit condition of free access, and still is today. Similarly, the Smithsonian Institution's museums are free of charge. The main argument supporting free admission to museums is that there are positive externalities associated with visiting them. Visitors can benefit from a subsidy that offsets all or part of the cost of their visit. The question is whether the subsidy is sufficient to fully offset the price of admission that would prevail without it. John O'Hagan (1995) examines the issue of free admission to national museums in Ireland and concludes that the introduction of admission charges to previously free museums does not significantly reduce attendance. Paradoxically, it increases the proportion of low-income, low-education visitors.

Alternatives to free admission (Note: In France, 38.3% of museums do not charge for access to their permanent collections, according to Benhamou, p. 56.) exist in the form of differentiated pricing, such as boxes with or without a suggested minimum donation, as well as unlimited access cards for a given duration. In addition, price discrimination is widely practiced: museums with low or zero admission charges charge comparatively high admission fees for temporary exhibitions. Other types of discrimination are possible by varying the price according to the day of the week, the geographical origin of visitors (a discount for residents of the city or country, whose taxes help finance the museum), or even their age. Economic theory suggests that such discriminations are effective in limiting congestion and maximizing both revenue and visitor numbers.

== Recent developments ==
=== "Star museums" ===
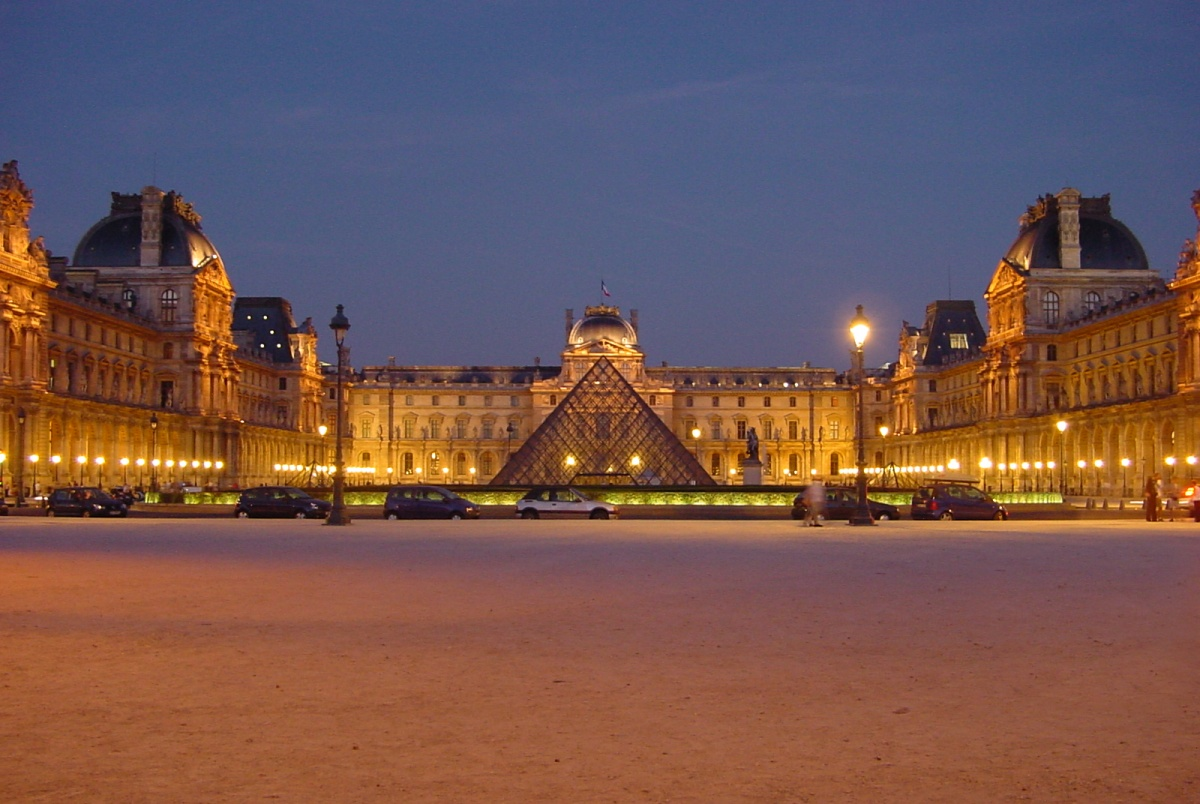
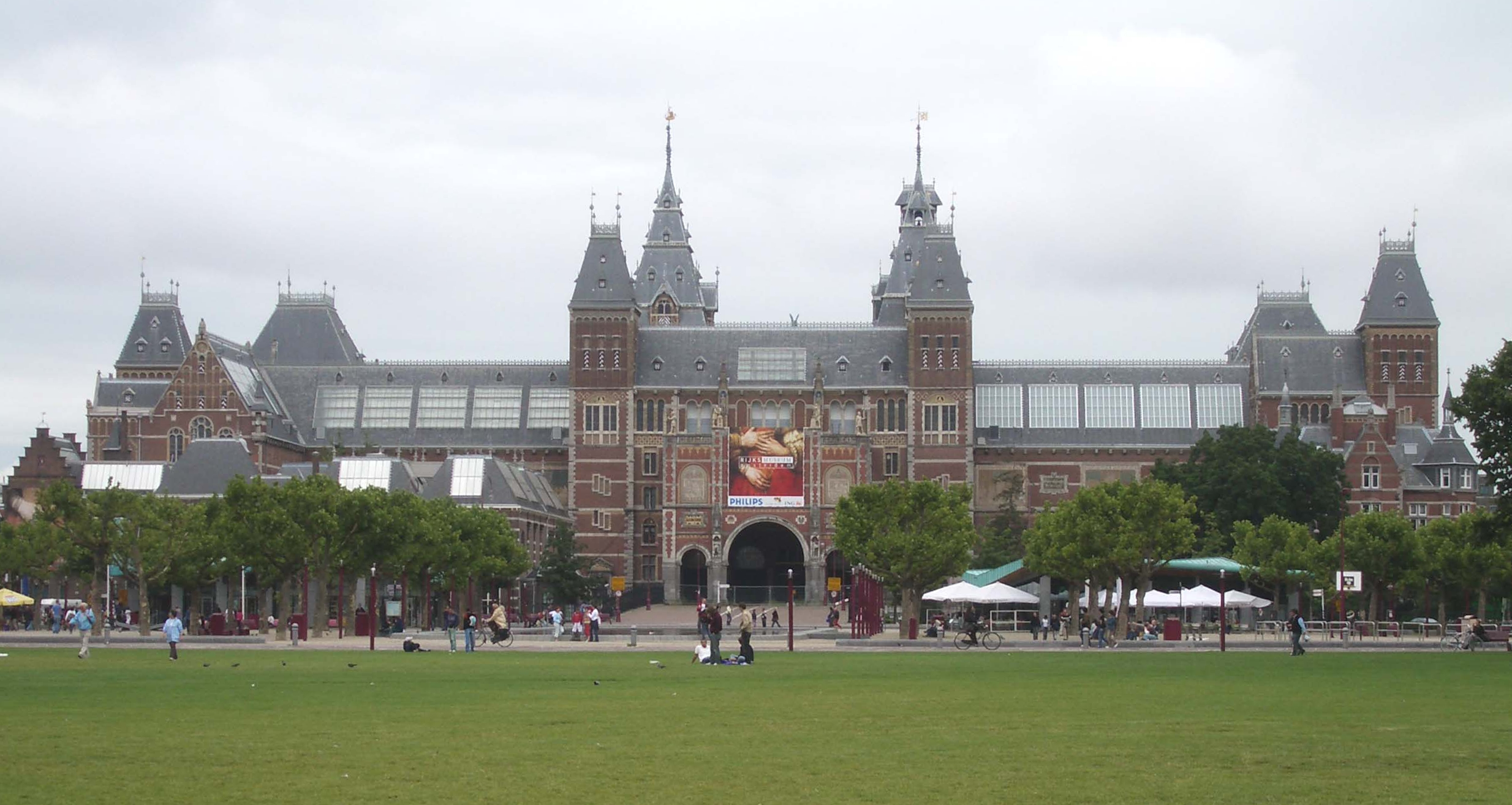
Examples of Star museums are the Louvre Museum and the Rijksmuseum

The concept of the star museum is based on the application of the superstar system concept to museums: a small number of museums attract a very large share of visits. B. S. Frey and S. Meier distinguish star museums by five characteristics:

1. They are a popular destination for tourists visiting the region. Examples include the Louvre, Hermitage, Prado and Rijksmuseum.
2. In recent years, the number of visitors to the museum has increased at a faster rate than that of other museums.
3. The museum's collections feature world-renowned works, which are the primary draw for most visitors. However, many are unaware of the composition of the rest of the collection, which also includes other major masterpieces. The Mona Lisa, for example, attracts large numbers of visitors to the Louvre, who also see Veronese's Wedding at Cana, on display in the same room. Museums are thus known as home to these works alone, which serve to attract the public, but make prisoners of the museums, which are forced to display and showcase them to the detriment of the attention paid to the rest of their collection.
4. The buildings often have exceptional architectural features. Recent additions have been made by world-renowned architects.
5. They are commercially driven, both through the sale of merchandising products and through their major impact on the local economy.

However, their status enables them to benefit from substantial scale economies in terms of media presence, and above all in the production of derivative products (virtual collections, multimedia tours, detailed catalogs of the collection or exhibitions), the cost of producing such products being essentially a fixed cost, independent of the number of customers. Likewise, they represent a brand image that enables them to create branches in various locations (the Louvre Abu Dhabi, the Tate in Liverpool, while the Prado lends a third of its collections to regional museums).

Star museums compete less with other local museums than with other star museums. They can attract visitors and reinforce their brand image through temporary exhibitions, spin-off activities, and seeking recognition of their buildings' historical significance. They often aim for a rounded visitor experience, combining their traditional conservation and educational functions with a focus on entertainment.

=== Special exhibitions ===
Well-publicized temporary exhibitions are a regular feature of major museums, and usually include works from other institutions. From an economic point of view, the existence and growing importance of these exhibitions pose a double problem. By mobilizing substantial resources, they stand in stark contrast to the budgetary stringency from which even the largest museums suffer, as they are forced to close entire wings from time to time. What is more, the circulation, manipulation, and exposure to large crowds of particularly fragile works seem to run counter to a museum's mission of preservation. The reasons for such exhibitions are linked to differences between their demand characteristics and production conditions and those of a museum's permanent collection.

==== Demand for temporary exhibitions ====
While access to many permanent collections is free (see above), access to temporary exhibitions is generally subject to a fee. In contrast to permanent collections, the income elasticity of temporary exhibitions seems to be greater than unity. The number of paying visitors to such exhibitions therefore increases mechanically with income, whereas visits to the permanent collection are more closely linked to an increase in the level of education, which is slower than that of income. As a result, the market for such exhibitions expands as income rises.

What's more, these exhibitions attract sections of the population who don't usually go to museums. They reassure audiences less familiar with art, both in terms of the quality of what they are about to see (these exhibitions are reputed to be denser in terms of masterpieces than a permanent collection) and in terms of the existence of a didactic apparatus to help them understand the works on display.

These exhibitions, focusing on an author, a genre or a period, also have a greater capacity to attract the attention of art lovers outside the museum's usual area of influence. Major exhibitions can be reason enough to cross the country, or even part of the continent. In terms of publicity, such exhibitions automatically generate significant media coverage. Media coverage of these exhibitions enables museums to benefit from free publicity in media such as television, which would otherwise be inaccessible to them.

Moreover, the price elasticity of visitors is low. Once tourists are on site, the cost of visiting the exhibition in addition to the permanent collection is simply an additional cost, and many museums offer combined tickets. Last but not least, the publicity associated with these exhibitions makes them a prime target for merchandising.

==== Temporary exhibitions offer ====
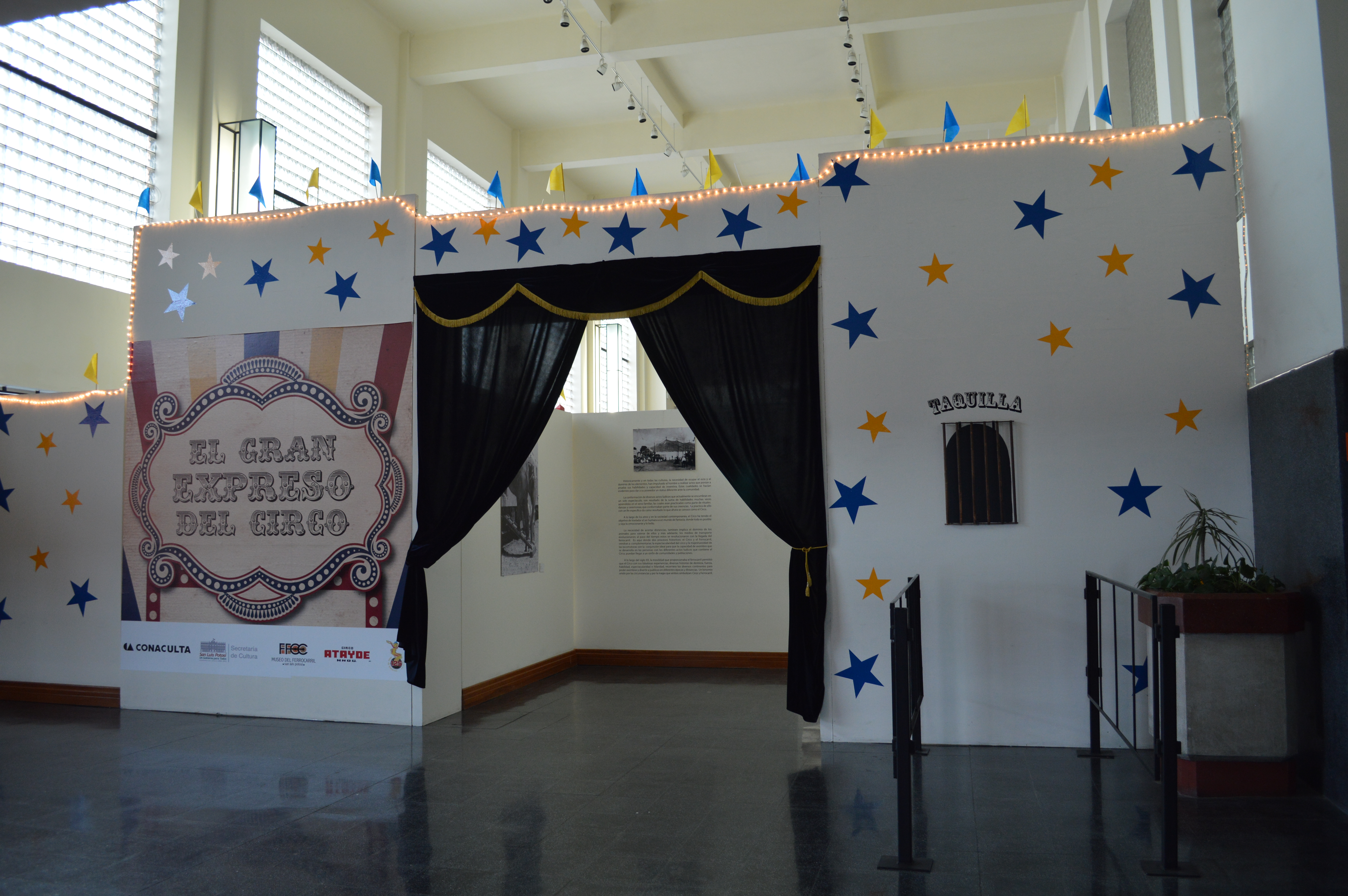
Temporary exhibit on the circus trains of Atayde at the Railway Museum in San Luis Potosi, Mexico

From the museum's point of view, the additional cost of a temporary exhibition is low: the closure of certain rooms in order to provide the necessary staff and space is not counted as an opportunity cost, and only a few visits are lost. Similarly, delays in maintaining and cataloguing the collection are not included in the cost calculation. Mechanically, this increases the perceived profitability of such events. Directors see such exhibitions as a means of generating additional resources. Yet their profitability has not been established. In France in 1992, national exhibitions generated 77.1 million francs in revenue for a cost (excluding the opportunity costs described above) of 62.6 million francs.

In organizing the permanent collection, curators are often constrained by tradition and the need to display certain works. This can result in a significant portion of the available space being occupied by irremovable pieces, either due to their notoriety or their sheer physical bulk. (e.g. at the Pergamon Museum). Temporary exhibitions, whose very purpose is to highlight aesthetic links between usually separate works, provide an opportunity for a curator to demonstrate his mastery of the most artistic aspects of his work, aspects that are fundamental to the advancement of his career and the recognition of his peers.

In addition, successful exhibitions generate income that is considered exceptional and does not result in a reduction of the endowment, which can happen when income from the permanent collection increases. This surplus of resources allows the museum to capture additional funds. This surplus is further enhanced by the fact that media exposure makes these exhibitions prime targets for private sponsorship operations, which are assured of impact and media presence, without this sponsorship being offset by a reduction in the endowment.

==== The future of exhibitions ====
As their practices become more widespread, the true costs of temporary exhibitions are better taken into account. However, the ability of these exhibitions to attract a large number of paying visitors and audiences who are typically absent from exhibition halls remains undiminished. According to B.S. Frey and S. Meier, while the growth of such exhibitions may slow down, they will continue to represent a significant part of museum activity and a factor in the partial integration of these institutions into a market logic that is open to the greatest possible number of people.

== See also ==
- Cultural economics
- History of schools of economic thought on arts and culture

== Bibliography ==
- Ginsburgh, Victor; Throsby, David (11 November 2006). "Chapter 29: The Economics of Museums". Handbook of the Economics of Art and Culture. Handbooks. Vol. 1. Amsterdam/Boston: North-Holland. pp. 1018–1047. ISBN 978-0-444-50870-6.
- Caves, Richard (2002). Creative Industries, Contracts between arts and commerce. Harvard: Harvard University Press. pp. 1018–1047. ISBN 978-0-674-00808-3.
- Benhamou, Françoise (2003). "Chap. IV Les marchés de l'art et du patrimoine; Les musées". L'Économie de la culture. Repères, 192 (in French) (4th ed.). Paris: La Découverte. pp. 1018–1047. ISBN 978-2-7071-3943-6.
