= Jan van Ours =

Dutch economist (born 1954)

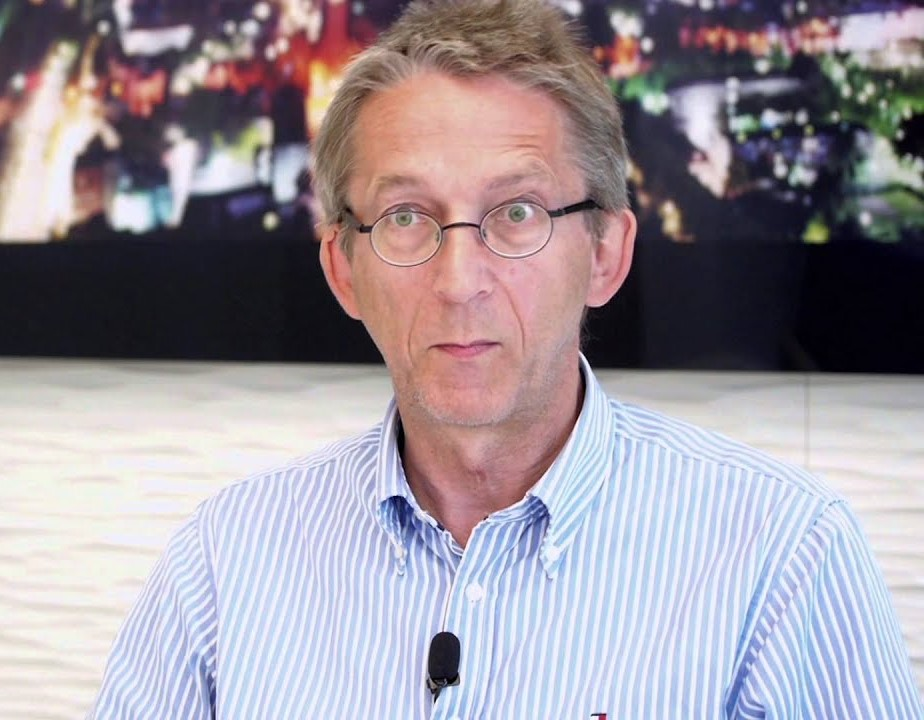
Jan C. van Ours

Jan C. van Ours (born in Stellendam in 1954) is a Dutch economist and currently Professor of Applied Economics at the Erasmus University Rotterdam (EUR). He belongs to the most highly cited economists in the Netherlands and is the 1996 winner of the Hicks-Tinbergen Award (together with Geert Ridder).

== Biography ==
A native of Stellendam, Jan van Ours earned a Master's degree in mining engineering from the Delft University of Technology in 1977, but subsequently changed his studies to economics, wherein he earned a master's degree and a Ph.D. from Erasmus University Rotterdam (EUR) in 1982 and 1986. Already in 1977, van Ours became member of the Scientific Council for Government Policy (1978–83), followed by an appointment to the Organisation for Labour Market Research (1983–88). In 1988, van Ours became an associate professor in economics at the Free University of Amsterdam (1988–94) before returning to Rotterdam as full professor in 1994. During his first tenure at EUR (1994–97), he also served as director of the Tinbergen Institute. In 1998, van Ours became Professor of Labor Economics at Tilburg University (1998-2016), where he also intermittently led the Department of Economics (1999-2000) and directed the Centre for Economic Research (CentER) (2001). Finally, in 2016, Jan van Ours returned to EUR, where he was appointed as Professor of Applied Economics.

Van Ours maintains professional affiliations with the Tinbergen Institute, CESifo, Centre for Economic Policy Research, Centre for Research and Economic Analysis on Migration, and the IZA Institute of Labor Economics. Moreover, he is a fellow of the European Association of Labour Economists, whose president he was from 2011 to 2014, and presided also over the European Society for Population Economics (2009). He also has been a member of the Central Planning Bureau of the Netherlands since 2014. Finally, Jan van Ours performs editorial duties at the academic reviews De Economist, Labour Economics and Journal of the Economics of Aging and has done so in the past for IZA World of Labor, Economic Policy, Journal of the European Economic Association, and the European Economic Review.

== Research ==
Jan van Ours' research focuses on labour economics and other applied economic topics. In particular, he has conducted substantial research on how labour market institutions affect employers and workers if labour markets aren't perfectly competitive (with Tito Boeri). According to IDEAS/RePEc, he belongs to the top 1% of economists in terms of research output.

=== Research on job search and job matching ===
In the 1990s, Jan van Ours has conducted extensive research on the topics of job search and job matching. Together with Geert Ridder, he finds that most vacancies are filled from a pool of job searchers shortly after the vacancy's posting, implying that vacancy durations reflect the duration of employers' selection process rather than applicants' search periods. Importantly, this pool not only includes unemployed but also employed job searchers, though less educated and higher educated job searchers don't tend to compete for the same jobs. Moreover, with Martin Lindeboom and Gusta Renes, van Ours finds important differences between the effectiveness of search channels: whereas employment offices are effective in matching unemployed workers, advertisements are effective for employed workers, and informal search channels are effective in both cases. Finally, comparing labour and job turnover, van Ours, Daniel Hamermesh and Wolter Hassink find that most mobility is not to new nor from destroyed jobs but rather into and out of existing jobs, firms with declining employment hire a lot and firms with expanding employment fire a lot, worker turnover is much larger than job turnover, and simultaneous hiring and firing exists.

=== Research on unemployment benefits, unemployment insurance and active labour market programmes ===
Another area of van Ours' research are the economics of unemployment insurance, benefits and active labour market policies. In the Netherlands, van Ours, Gerard van den Berg and Jaap Abbring find that reductions of unemployed persons' benefits for failing to meet search requirements are effective in raising individual re-employment rates. This finding is also substantiated by van Ours' research with Rafael Lalive and Josef Zweimüller on Switzerland, wherein warnings and enforcement are found to increase unemployment outflows both towards employment and out-of-the labour force and actual benefit reductions lower the quality of post-unemployment jobs in terms of duration and earnings. Moreover, stricter monitoring of eligibility requirements reduces the unemployment durations of the non-sanctioned as well as their earnings. Further research by van Ours with Lalive and Zweimüller on Austria has highlighted the role of behavioural responses by the unemployed to changes in their financial incentives, e.g. increases in unemployment durations in response to higher benefit replacement rates. Additionally, research with Milan Vodopivec on Slovenia also finds that reducing the potential duration of unemployment benefits increases unemployment outflows but doesn't affect the quality of job matches in terms of wages, contract type or match duration.

Analysing the impact of ALMPs in Switzerland, van Ours, Lalive and Zweimüller find some evidence that temporary subsidised job may reduce unemployment duration, whereas training and employment programmes don't. By contrast, van Ours and Graversen find mandatory activation programmes in Denmark to be very effective with regard to reducing unemployment duration, possibly because more intensive contacts between the unemployed and public placement services. Finally, van Ours and Jan Boone find evidence suggesting that labour market training is effective in reducing unemployment, whereas public employment services and job subsidization aren't.

=== Research on unemployment, part-time work, education, age and employment protection ===
Other research on labour economics by van Ours has dealt with topics such as the relationship between unemployment, part-time work, education, age, employment protection. Analysing the relationship between unemployment, labour market institutions and labour market reforms with Michèle Belot, van Ours show that particular combinations of labour market institutions are effective in terms of lowering unemployment rates. Investigating the effects of working hours on satisfaction with Alison Booth, van Ours finds that neither men's nor women's life satisfaction is affected by their hours of work, though men's hours-of-work satisfaction is highest for full-time jobs and that of women is highest for part-time jobs of any size, in line with theories linking family happiness with work patterns conforming to traditional gender identities. In research with Lenny Stoeldraijer, van Ours finds no evidence of an age related pay-productivity gap in Dutch manufacturing. Studying the educational attainment of second-generation immigrants in the Netherlands together with Justus Veenman, they conclude that differences in the level of education of their parents are driving the differences in educational attainment between second-generation immigrants and native Dutch people. Finally, another important research finding of van Ours' work with Belot and Boone is that employment protection may be welfare-improving, though the optimal level of employment protection is mediated by labour market features such as workers' relative bargaining power and wage rigidities (e.g. minimum wages).
