= Yann Algan =

French economist (born 1974)

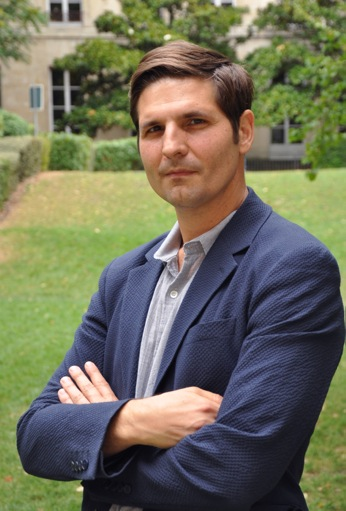
- Born: April 3, 1974 (age 52); Paris, France

Academic background
- Education: Paris 1 Panthéon-Sorbonne University (BA, MA, PhD)

Academic work
- Discipline: Public economics; Cultural economics; Political economy
- Institutions: HEC Paris; Sciences Po; Paris School of Economics; University of Paris-Est Marne-la-Vallée

Yann Algan (born in Paris April 3, 1974) is a French economist, Associate Dean of Pre-experience Programs and Professor of Economics at HEC Paris. Until 2021, he was a Professor of Economics of Sciences Po, where he was dean of the School of Public Affairs. His research interests include the digital economy, social capital and well-being. In 2009, Yann Algan (with Thomas Philippon) was awarded the Prize of the Best Young Economist of France for his contributions to economics in France.

== Biography ==
A native of Paris, Yann Algan earned bachelor's and master's degrees in philosophy as well as a PhD in economics, all from Paris 1 Panthéon-Sorbonne University. For the latter, he was awarded the Prize for Best French PhD thesis in 2002. After his PhD, he became an assistant professor at the University Paris 1 and held a post-doctoral position at the University of California, San Diego in 2002 before receiving his agrégation in economics in 2004. He then worked at the University of Paris-Est Marne-la-Vallée (2004–07) and later at the Paris School of Economics as Professor of Economics (2006–08), before moving to Sciences Po in 2008. In 2015, Algan was appointed as dean of Sciences Po's School of Public Affairs. In 2021, he left Sciences Po to become Associate Dean of Pre-experience Programs and Professor of Economics at HEC Paris. Additionally, Algan has held visiting appointments at the Massachusetts Institute of Technology and Harvard University. In parallel to his academic positions, he maintains affiliations with the IZA Institute of Labor Economics and the Center for Economic Policy Research (CEPR), is a member of the Council of Economic Analysis and of the OECD High Level Expert Group on the Measurement of Economic Performance and Social Progress, and co-director of the Research Center on Labor Market Policy, a research center involving Sciences Po, CREST, DARES, Pole Emploi, Unedic and Alpha. Additionally, he is a senior editor of the academic review Economic Policy.

== Research ==
Algan's areas of research include public economics, cultural economics, political economy, experimental economics, labour economics, social networks, and well-being. In his research, he has frequently collaborated with Pierre Cahuc. A key theme of Algan's research is the importance of trust in societies and economies. For example, in The Society of Defiance ("La société de défiance"; with Cahuc) Algan documents how distrust between French citizens among each other as well as with regard to the market economy and government has been growing since the 1990s, eroding civic behaviour, and argues that this growing distrust is both due and in turn fuels French corporatism, wherein the government regulates large aspects of citizens' lives.

According to IDEAS/RePEc, Algan ranks among the top 3% of economists in terms of his research. Key findings of research include the following:

- Differences in inherited trust explain a substantial share of the differences in per capita incomes between countries (with Pierre Cahuc); the strength of that result was later questioned by Müller, Torgler, and Uslaner (2012).
- Government regulation is strongly negatively correlated with measures of trust, suggesting that distrust creates public demand for regulation and regulation in turn discourages the formation of trust (with Cahuc, Philippe Aghion, Andrei Shleifer).
- In France, (Germany) and the UK, the gap between natives and immigrants in terms of educational achievement decreases over generations, though overall in all three countries the labour market performance of most immigrant groups as well as their descendants is generally worse than that of natives, even if differences in education, regional allocation and experience are taken into account (with Christian Dustmann, Albrecht Glitz and Alan Manning).
- Compared to other social scientists, economists in the U.S. have generally much higher incomes, more individualist worldviews, and a confident view on economics' ability to solve the world's problems, creating a subjective sense of authority and entitlement that sustains economists' practical involvement in and influence over the economy (with Marion Fourcade and Etienne Ollion).
- Civic attitudes and the design of unemployment benefits and employment protection in OECD countries over the 1980s and 1990s are strongly correlated, suggesting that differences in civic virtue drive differences in labour market institutions (with Pierre Cahuc).
- Individuals with strong family ties are less geographically mobile, have lower wages and are more likely to be unemployed, and support more stringent labour market regulations (with Cahuc, Alberto Alesina, and Paola Giuliano).
- Public employment in the OECD countries is found to crowd out private sector employment, depresses labour force participation and increases unemployment (with Cahuc and André Zylberberg).
