= Pierre Cahuc =

French economist

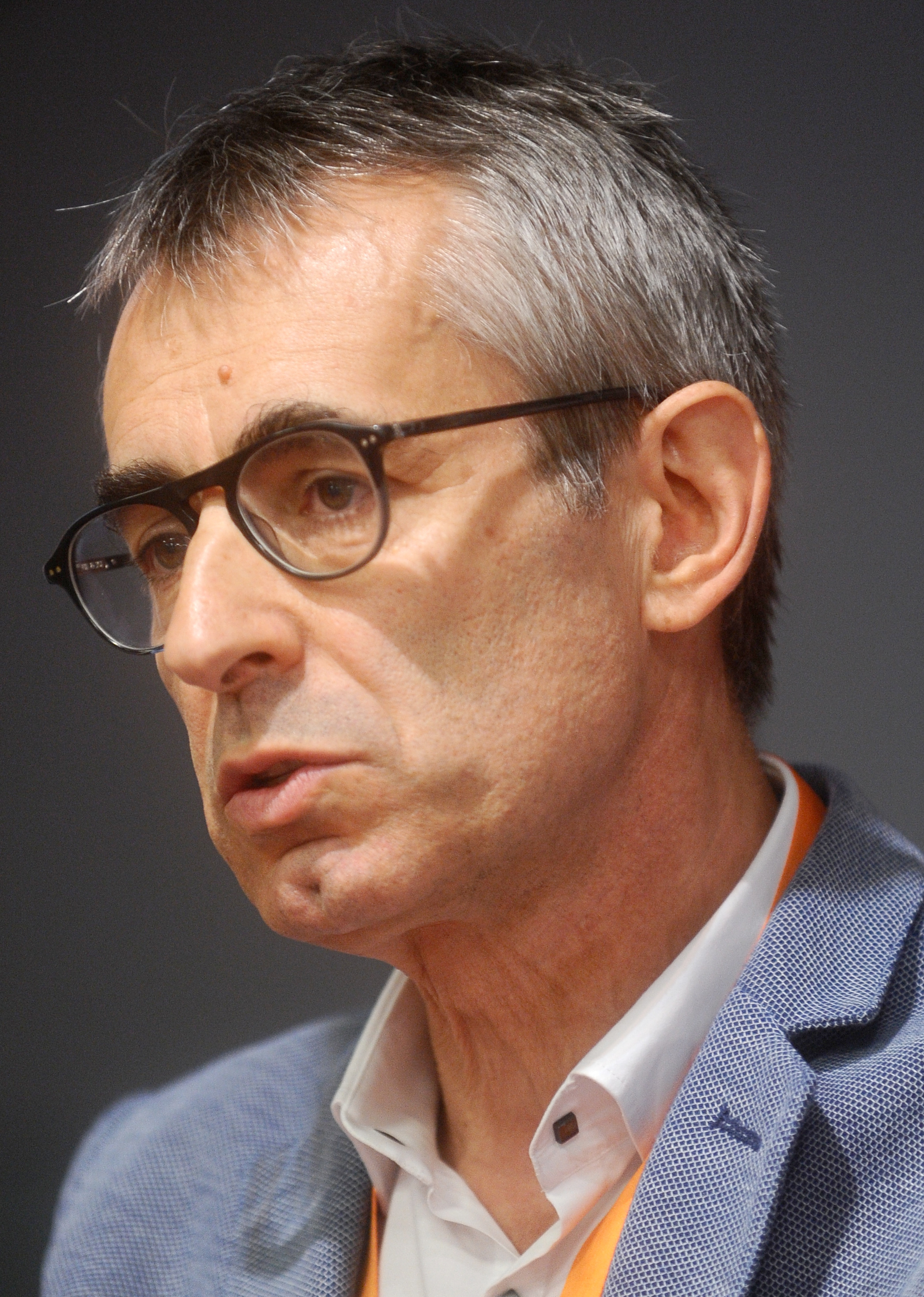
Pierre Cahuc at the Festival Festival of Economics in Trento in 2018

Pierre Cahuc (born January 18, 1962) is a French economist who currently works as Professor of Economics at Sciences Po. He is Program Director for the IZA Institute of Labor Economics's programme "Labour Markets" and research fellow at CEPR. His research focuses mainly on labour economics and its relationship with macroeconomics. In 2001, he was awarded the Prize of the Best Young Economist of France for his contributions to economic research. He belongs to the most highly cited economists in France and Europe's leading labour economists.

== Biography ==
Pierre Cahuc earned master's degrees in public law, political science, and economics from the Université Paris I Panthéon-Sorbonne in 1984, followed by a DEA in macroeconomics in 1985, a D.E.A. in political sociology in 1986, and a PhD in economics in 1989. In 1990, Cahuc obtained his agrégation in economic science. After his graduation, he accepted a position as professor of economics at the Université des Antilles et de la Guyane but returned to Metropolitan France in 1992, where he became professor of economics at the Université Paris I (1992–2003). Having been an associate professor of economics at the École Polytechnique from 1998 to 2007, he was promoted to full professor in 2007 and also became professor of economics at the École Nationale de la Statistique et de l'Administration Économique (ENSAE) in 2011 as well as Director of the Macroeconomic Laboratory of the ENSAE's Center for Research in Economics and Statistics (CREST). and director of Economic research at CREST (2015). He joined Sciences Po in 2018. Moreover, he holds the chair of the "securization of professional trajectories". In addition to his academic positions, Cahuc maintains professional affiliations with the IZA Institute of Labor Economics, where he directs the programme area on labour markets, and the Centre for Economic Policy Research (CEPR). Furthermore, he has been a member of the Council of Economic Analysis from 2006 to 2010 and from 2012 to 2016, the expert group on the minimum wage in France (2012-2016), the National Economic Commission (an advisory council of the French Minister of Economics and Finance), and of the Council on Employment, Income and Social Cohesion. Finally, he performs editorial duties for the academic reviews Labour Economics, Journal of Economics, European Economic Review, American Economic Journal: Macroeconomics, IZA World of Labor, and IZA Journal of Labor Economics.

== Research ==
Pierre Cahuc's research focuses mainly on labour economics. He has written books on the economics of salary negotiations, the reduction of working time, unemployment in France, social security, job flows, minimum wages, unemployment insurance, vocational education, economic debate, and social trust; his book on this last topic, The Society of Defiance ("La Société de Défiance") written with Yann Algan, documents how distrust between French citizens among each other as well as with regard to the market economy and government has been growing since the 1990s, eroding civic behaviour, and argues that this growing distrust is both due and in turn fuels French corporatism, wherein the government regulates large aspects of citizens' lives. Together with André Zylberberg and Stéphane Carcillo, he has written several textbooks on labour economics aimed at graduate students. According to IDEAS/RePEc, Cahuc ranks among the top 2% of research economists worldwide. In his research, he has frequently collaborated with Yann Algan, Stéphane Carcillo, André Zylberberg and Fabien Postel-Visnay. Key findings of his research include the following:

- Differences in inherited trust explain a substantial share of the differences in per capita incomes between countries (with Algan); the strength of that result was later questioned by Müller, Torgler, and Uslaner (2012).
- Government regulation is strongly negatively correlated with measures of trust, suggesting that distrust creates public demand for regulation and regulation in turn discourages the formation of trust (with Algan, Philippe Aghion, and Andrei Shleifer).
- The combination of temporary jobs and (tenure-based) employment protection policies, while beneficial to a majority of employees if company ownership is sufficiently concentrate, likely increases unemployment by raising firms' job turnover, as employers face incentives to reduce firing costs by limiting employees' tenure (with Postel-Visnay).
- The relative lack of competition between French employers for low-skilled and medium-skilled workers explains these groups' lack of wage bargaining power (with Postel-Visnay and Jean-Marc Robin).
- Civic attitudes and the design of unemployment benefits and employment protection in the OECD over the 1980s and 1990s are strongly correlated, suggesting that differences in civic virtue drive differences in labour market institutions (with Algan).
- Individuals with strong family ties are less geographically mobile, have lower wages and are more likely to be unemployed, and support more stringent labour market regulations (with Algan, Alberto Alesina, and Paola Giuliano).
- Spain could have kept its unemployment rate below 15% (instead of 23%) during the Great Recession if it had adopted French employment protection legislation and thereby restricted the use of temporary contracts, thus avoiding the amplification of the effect of the gap between the firing costs of permanent and temporary contracts (with Samuel Bentolila, Juan Dolado, and Thomas Le Barbanchon).
- In an overlapping generations model with endogenous growth, minimum wage legislation can increase growth by inducing workers to accumulate human capital by reducing the demand for low-skilled labour (with Philippe Michel).
- If job search intensity and wages are endogenous and the tax rate constant, then a more degressive time sequence of unemployment benefits may increase wage pressure and, by extension, increase unemployment (with Etienne Lehmann).
- Public employment in the OECD is found to crowd out private sector employment, depresses labour force participation and increases unemployment (with Algan and Zylberberg).
