= Immigration and crime =

Refers to perceived or actual relationships between crime and immigration

The relationship between immigration and crime has been a subject of extensive research, political discourse, and public debate.

Immigrants are disproportionately represented in prison populations in many Western countries, though notable exceptions exist, such as the United States. In Europe and other regions, higher representation in prisons among immigrants, particularly Muslim populations, has been documented. However, some of the factors contributing to these trends include imprisonment for migration-related offenses and systemic bias in policing and judicial processes, which may inflate crime statistics for immigrant populations relative to their real criminal rate. Research suggests that public perception often exaggerates the connection between immigration and crime, influenced by sensationalised media coverage and political rhetoric. This can result in stricter immigration controls, as well as harsher immigration policies like family separation; along with a potential increase in hate crimes against immigrant communities.

== Factors ==
Research relating to immigration and crime has been described as generally showing mixed results.

While immigrants are overrepresented in prison populations in many Western countries, with notable exceptions such as the United States, some studies fail to show a causal effect of immigration on overall crime rates. Other studies have found that immigration increases crime under certain circumstances, such as if immigrants have poor prospects in the labor market or labor restrictions.

Some factors may affect the reliability of data on suspect rates, crime rates, conviction rates and prison populations for drawing conclusions about immigrants' overall involvement in criminal activity:

- Police practices, such as racial profiling, over-policing in areas populated by immigrants or in-group bias may result in disproportionately high numbers of immigrants among crime suspects.
- Possible discrimination by the judicial system may result in higher number of convictions.
- Unfavorable bail and sentencing decisions due to foreigners' ease of flight, lack of domiciles, lack of regular employment and lack of family able to host the individual can explain immigrants' higher incarceration rates when compared to their share of convictions relative to the native population.
- Non-immigrants may be more likely to report crimes when they believe the offender has an immigrant background.
- Imprisonment for migration offenses, which are more common among immigrants without a residence permit in their host country, would need to be excluded from the analysis of crime statistics for meaningful comparisons between overall immigrant and native criminal involvement.
- Foreigners imprisoned for drug offenses may not actually live in the country where they are serving sentences but were arrested while in transit.
- Crimes by short-term migrants, such as tourists, exchange students and transient workers, are in some cases counted as crimes by immigrants or foreigners, and gives the impression that a higher share of the migrant population commits crimes (as these short-term migrants are not counted among the foreign-born population).
- Some immigrants might disproportionately locate in deprived areas where crime is higher (because they cannot afford to stay in more expensive areas) or because they tend to locate in areas where there is a large population of residents of the same ethnic background. Some research suggests that the allocation of refugee immigrants to high crime neighborhoods increases individual crime propensity later in life due to social interaction with criminals.
- Granting legal status to undocumented immigrants might reduce crime rates among that population due to factors like greater job market opportunities for the legal immigrants. Some scholars suggested the relationship between crime and the legal status of immigrants was understudied.
- Demographic characteristics like being young, male, and poorly-educated can increase the likelihood of imprisonment among immigrants.
- Immigrants could become substitutes for natives in crime markets, resulting in no change to the overall amount of crime taking place.
- "Irregular aliens (that is, those not officially registered by the appropriate process in that nation) would be counted in the share of immigrants in the prison population, but not in the share of immigrants in the resident population."

== Trends ==
According to migration scientist Hein de Haas in 2023, "violent crime is decreasing in almost the entire Western world. In addition, studies show that migrants are actually less criminal on average. This is because first-generation migrants are often people who want to build a new future". De Haas noted an overrepresentation of certain immigrant groups in crime statistics, which he attributed to ethnic profiling and some second-generation immigrants who have no future prospects.

According to a 2024 article migrants in 30 countries, many (though not the United States, UK, Australia or New Zealand) have higher share of prison populations compared to native-born populations. Among immigrants, younger and less-educated men, as well as those with undocumented or irregular legal status, have a higher propensity to commit crimes compared to those with documented status.

== Terrorism ==
As of 2020, the relationship between immigration and terrorism was inconclusive. A 2016 study finds that migrants from terror-prone states increase the risk of terrorism in the host country, but when immigration is not necessarily linked to terrorism in the migrants' countries of origin, immigration is associated with a lower level of terrorism in the host country. The authors note that "only a minority of migrants from high-terrorism states can be associated with increases in terrorism, and not necessarily in a direct way."

A paper by a group of German political scientists and economists, covering 1980–2010, found that on average, the foreigners were not more likely to become terrorists than the natives. The study also found little evidence that terrorism is systematically imported from predominantly Muslim countries, the exceptions being Algeria and Iran. High-skilled migrants are associated with a significantly lower risk of terror compared to low-skilled ones, while there is no significant difference between male and female migrants. The study found a risk trade-off: increased immigration laws could decrease the influx of migrants and therefore the potential number of future terrorist attacks, but diminished acceptance by the host country of the migrants increased the terror risk of those already in the country. Research focusing on the security impact of the European migrant crisis found little to no relationship between increasing migration flows and acts of terrorism.

According to Olivier Roy in 2017 analyzing the previous two decades of terrorism in France, the typical jihadist is a second-generation immigrant or convert who after a period of petty crime was radicalized in prison. Georgetown University terrorism expert Daniel Byman agree with Olivier Roy that repression of minority groups, such as Muslims, makes it easier for terrorist organizations to recruit from those minority groups. Roy has argued that the burkini bans and secularist policies of France provoked religious violence in France, which French scholar Gilles Kepel disputed saying that Britain did not have those policies and still suffered several jihadist attacks in 2017.

== Perception ==
Research suggests that people overestimate the relationship between immigration and criminality. Two 2023 studies, one of Switzerland and one of Chile, have documented how a rise in immigration leads to a rise in fears about immigrant crime without any corresponding rise in crime, with authors of both studies suggesting that media competition led to the overemphasis of immigrant crime narratives and perceptions.

A January 2024 survey in the U.S. found that 57% of Americans believe migrants lead to more crime, which some experts attribute to anecdotal media stories that lack context. Graham Ousey believes the perception stems from flashpoint events that politicians use to push up the myth that immigrants create more crime. Donald Trump has been the most prominent promoter of the false link between immigration and crime, according to the Associated Press. Guadalupe Correa-Cabrera argues it is a cornerstone of the MAGA platform.

A 2016 study of Belgium found that living in an ethnically diverse community led to a greater fear of crime, unrelated to the actual crime statistics. A 2015 study found that the increase in immigration flows into western European countries that took place in the 2000s did "not affect crime victimization, but it is associated with an increase in the fear of crime, the latter being consistently and positively correlated with the natives' unfavourable attitude toward immigrants." Americans dramatically overestimate the relationship between refugees and terrorism. A 2018 study found that media coverage of immigrants in the United States has a general tendency to emphasize illegality and/or criminal behavior in a way that is inconsistent with actual immigrant demographics. A study of coverage of refugees in the Guardian and the Times in the UK from 2015 to 2018 found that media portrayals made Muslim refugees seem like threats to the economy or security and exaggerated differences between these refugees and the native population.

The Economist reported in 2018 that some right-wing parties make claims about a connection between immigration and crime, even though the issues are mostly unrelated.

== Politics ==
Research suggests that the perception that there is a positive causal link between immigration and crime leads to greater support for anti-immigration policies or parties. Research also suggests a vicious cycle of bigotry and immigrant alienation could exacerbate immigrant criminality and bigotry. For instance, UC San Diego political scientist Claire Adida, Stanford University political scientist David Laitin, and Sorbonne University economist Marie-Anne Valfort argue:

[F]ear-based policies that target groups of people according to their religion or region of origin are counter-productive. Our own research, which explains the failed integration of Muslim immigrants in France, suggests that such policies can feed into a vicious cycle that damages national security. French Islamophobia—a response to cultural difference—has encouraged Muslim immigrants to withdraw from French society, which then feeds back into French Islamophobia, thus further exacerbating Muslims' alienation, and so on. Indeed, the failure of French security in 2015 was likely due to police tactics that intimidated rather than welcomed the children of immigrants—an approach that makes it hard to obtain crucial information from community members about potential threats.

A study of the long-run effects of the 9/11 terrorist attacks found that the post-9/11 increase in hate crimes against Muslims decreased assimilation by Muslim immigrants. Controlling for relevant factors, the authors found that "Muslim immigrants living in states with the sharpest increase in hate crimes also exhibit: greater chances of marrying within their own ethnic group; higher fertility; lower female labour force participation; and lower English proficiency." Hate crimes and family separation have also been consequences of rhetoric linking crime to migration from Mexico.

States that experience terrorist acts on their own soil or against their own citizens are more likely to adopt stricter restrictions on asylum recognition. Individuals who believe that African Americans and Hispanics are more prone to violence are more likely to support capital punishment. The Dillingham Commission singled out immigrants from Southern Europe for their involvement in violent crime (even though the data did not support its conclusions). The commission's overall findings provided the rationale for sweeping 1920s immigration-reduction acts, including the Emergency Quota Act of 1921, which favored immigration from northern and western Europe by restricting the annual number of immigrants from any given country to 3 percent of the total number of people from that country living in the United States in 1910. The movement for immigration restriction that the Dillingham Commission helped to stimulate culminated in the National Origins Formula, part of the Immigration Act of 1924, which capped national immigration at 150,000 annually and completely barred immigration from Asia.

== Asia ==
=== Japan ===
A survey of existing research on immigration and crime in Japan found that "prosecution and sentencing in Japan do seem to result in some disparities by nationality, but the available data are too limited to arrive at confident conclusions about their nature or magnitude". According to a 1997 news report, a large portion of crimes by immigrants are by Chinese in Japan, and some highly publicized crimes by organized groups of Chinese (often with help of Japanese organized crime) have led to a negative public perception of immigrants. According to the National Police Agency in 2015, Vietnamese nationals overtook Chinese as having the highest number of criminal offenses for foreigners. The number of offenses has reportedly been on the rise as of 2021, and has been linked to the lower economic status of Vietnamese in Japan.

=== Malaysia ===
A 2017 study found that immigration to Malaysia decreases property crime rates and violent crime rates. In the case of property crime rates, this is in part because immigrants improve economic conditions for natives.

== Europe ==
Most studies fail to show any causal effect of immigration on overall crime rates. A 2015 study found that the increase in immigration flows into western European countries that took place in the 2000s did "not affect crime victimization, but it is associated with an increase in the fear of crime, the latter being consistently and positively correlated with the natives' unfavourable attitude toward immigrants." In a survey of the existing economic literature on immigration and crime, one economist describes the existing literature in 2014 as showing that "the results for Europe are mixed for property crime but no association is found for violent crime".

=== Denmark ===
Crime index of males in Denmark by country of origin

Descendants of non-Western immigrants are significantly overrepresented in criminal statistics, especially in violent crimes, traffic violations, and certain sexual offenses.

A 2019 report by the Danish Crime Prevention Council reviewed 12 studies and came to the conclusion that it is likely that adults under 30 with an ethnic minority background are overrepresented in crime statistics. It noted methodological differences between the studies making it hard to draw definitive conclusions.

A 2019 study reviewing ten studies on the relationship between immigration and crime in Denmark found that different studies came to different conclusions as to whether immigrants were overrepresented, depending on what kind of data was used.

Immigrants who have committed crimes may be denied Danish citizenship. For instance, immigrants who have received a prison sentence of one year or more, or at least three months for crimes against a person cannot receive citizenship. Convictions which have resulted in a fine also carries with it a time period for immigrants, where citizenship applications are rejected up to 4.5 years after the fine. Upon several offences, the period is extended by 3 years. In the 2018-2020 period, 83 people were denied Danish citizenship because they had committed a serious crime. Among those were people who had received court sentences for gang crime, violence against children and sexual offenses. People who have received a prison sentence of at least one year are barred from receiving citizenship, along with people who have received a prison sentence of at least three months for a crime against a person. In April 2021, the Mette Frederiksen Cabinet approved regulation which stops awarding citizenship to foreigners who had received a prison sentence in court which also encompassed suspended prison sentences. Previously, awarding citizenship was possible for foreigners with a prison sentence of less than a year. One study of Denmark found that providing immigrants with voting rights reduced their crime rate.

A report by Statistics Denmark released in December 2015 found that 83% of crimes are committed by individuals of Danish origin (88% of the total population), 14% by individuals of non-Western descent and 3% by those of non-Danish Western descent. An index standardized for age shows that crime rates are 48% higher among male immigrants and 140% higher among male descendants of immigrants. At 4%, male migrants aged 15–64 with non-Western backgrounds had twice the conviction rate against the Danish Penal Code in 2018, compared to 2% for Danish men. In a given year, about 13% of all male descendants of non-Western migrants aged 17–24 are convicted against the penal code. In 2017, 30% of the prison population were foreign nationals with the largest group being Romanian citizens, followed by Turkish. and Lithuanian citizens. On 1 July 2017, there were 3403 inmates and 2382 of those were Danish citizens.

A 2014 study of the random dispersal of refugee immigrants over the period 1986–1998, and focusing on the immigrant children who underwent this random assignment before the age of 15, suggests that exposure to neighbourhood crime increases individual crime propensity. The share of convicted criminals living in the assignment neighborhood at assignment affects later crime convictions of males, but not of females, who were assigned to these neighborhoods as children. The authors "find that a one standard deviation increase in the share of youth criminals living in the assignment neighborhood, and who committed a crime in the assignment year, increases the probability of a conviction for male assignees by between 5 percent and 9 percent later in life (when they are between 15 and 21 years old)."

In late 2020, the minister for Immigration and Integration, Mattias Tesfaye, announced that the category "Non-Western immigrant" in Danish statistics on immigrants was to be changed where immigrants with higher rates of crime and unemployment were to be placed into the MENAPT category encompassing immigrants from the Middle East, North Africa, Pakistan and Turkey. This was due to the "Non-Western" category encompassed major differences as integration of immigrants from Thailand, the Philippines and Latin America was markedly different from those of the Middle East. Of the about 500 thousand immigrants and second-generation immigrants in Denmark, 54.5 percent came from MENAPT countries. Statistics showed that young males from MENAPT countries had markedly higher crime rates than the corresponding group from other non-Western countries, where 4.6% had been sentenced for crimes while from other non-Western countries the rate was 1.8%.

=== Finland ===
Immigrant crime in Finland became a topic of public debate in the 1990s-early 21st century period with the arrivals of Somalis in Finland.

Offences against the Criminal Code by nationality in 2017-2018 [non-primary source needed]
Origin	Per 1000 citizens
Sweden	80.75
Iraq	70.07
Somalia	66.56
Estonia	56.97
Romania	48.79
Russia	42.14
Foreign countries' average	41.83
Finland	35.71
Source: Statistics Finland.

In 1998, 10 times more "foreign-looking" men were accused of rape than the overall percentage of foreigners in Finland, which the Chief Inspector interviewed explained that at least part of that disparity could be because, "It may be that a Finnish woman regards it as more of a crime when the perpetrator is foreign. If the rapist is a Finn, the woman might perhaps think more about her own role in what has happened."

A 2015 study found that immigrant youth had higher incidence rates in 14 out of 17 delinquent acts. The gap is small for thefts and vandalism, and no significant differences for shoplifting, bullying and use of intoxicants. According to the authors, "weak parental social control and risk routines, such as staying out late, appear to partly explain the immigrant youths' higher delinquency", and "the relevance of socioeconomic factors was modest".

According to 2014 official statistics, 24% of rapes are estimated to have been committed by individuals with foreign surnames in Finland.

=== France ===
A 2006 study found "that the share of immigrants in the population has no significant impact on crime rates once immigrants' economic circumstances are controlled for, while finding that unemployed immigrants tend to commit more crimes than unemployed non-immigrants." As shown in the 2006 study with 1999 French census data calculations, an unemployed nonimmigrant outlier raises the number of crimes by 0.297, and another raises it by 0.546.

Aoki and Yasuyuki's research show that data that is frequently shown regarding French immigration and crime is misleading, as it does not take discrimination and economic hardships into account as a motivator for criminal acts. As shown in the 2006 study, after adding the share of unemployed immigrants in the labor force, it is determined that the effect of the share of immigrants now becomes insignificant.

With the exception of 2015 in Macrotrends collection of data, French crime rates overall have been on the steady decline, experiencing a 5.68% decline from 2017 to 2018. However, immigration rates are on the incline, with a 10.74% increase of migrants granted asylum from 2017 to 2018. This data from 1990 to 2022 indicates that crime rates and migration rates do not correlate if one is only looking at the numbers, with no other qualitative factors in place.

A study by sociologist Farhad Khosrokhavar, director of studies at the EHESS, found that "Muslims, mostly from North African origin, are becoming the most numerous group in [French prisons]." His work has been criticized for taking into account only 160 prisoners in 4 prisons, all close to northern Paris where most immigrants live.

According to police figures, 77% of perpetrators of solved rapes in Paris during 2023 were of foreign nationality.

=== Germany ===
Published in 2017, the first comprehensive study of the social effects of the one million refugees going to Germany found that it caused "very small increases in crime in particular with respect to drug offenses and fare-dodging." A 2021 study found that asylum seekers had no impact on violent crime in Germany. A 2019 study by Otto von Guericke University Magdeburg economists found that the arrival of nearly one million refugees in 2015 did not increase the likelihood that Germans would be the victims of crime.

A January 2018 Zurich University of Applied Sciences study commissioned by the German government attributed over 90% of a 10% overall rise in violent crime from to 2015 to 2016 in Lower Saxony to refugees. The study's authors noted that there were great differences between different refugee groups. Refugees from North African countries Algeria, Tunisia and Morocco constituted 0.9% of refugees but represented 17.1% of violent crime refugee suspects and 31% of robbery refugee suspects. The latter corresponds to a 35-fold over-representation. Refugees from Afghanistan, Syria and Iraq represented 54.7% of the total, but represented 16% of refugee robbery suspects and 34.9% violent crime suspects and were thus underrepresented.

A report released by the German Federal Office of Criminal Investigation in November 2015 found that over the period January–September 2015, the crime rate of refugees was the same as that of native Germans. According to Deutsche Welle, the report "concluded that the majority of crimes committed by refugees (67 percent) consisted of theft, robbery and fraud. Sex crimes made for less than 1 percent of all crimes committed by refugees, while homicide registered the smallest fraction at 0.1 percent." According to the conservative newspaper Die Welt's description of the report, the most common crime committed by refugees was not paying fares on public transportation. According to Deutsche Welle's reporting in February 2016 of a report by the German Federal Office of Criminal Investigation, the number of crimes committed by refugees did not rise in proportion to the number of refugees between 2014 and 2015. According to Deutsche Welle, "between 2014 and 2015, the number of crimes committed by refugees increased by 79 percent. Over the same period the number of refugees in Germany increased by 440 percent."

The U.S. fact-checker PolitiFact noted that Germany's crime data suggests that the crime rate of the average refugee is lower than that of the average German. In April 2017, the crime figures released for 2016 showed that the number of suspected crimes by refugees, asylum-seekers and illegal immigrants increased by 50 percent. The figures showed that most of the suspected crimes were by repeat offenders, and that 1 percent of migrants accounted for 40 percent of total migrant crimes.

A 2017 study in the European Economic Review found that the German government's policy of immigration of more than 3 million people of German descent to Germany after the collapse of the Soviet Union led to a significant increase in crime. The effects were strongest in regions with high unemployment, high preexisting crime levels or large shares of foreigners. According to another 2017 study in the European Journal of Criminology, the crime rate was higher among immigrant youths than native youths during the 1990s and 2000s but most of the difference could be explained by socioeconomic factors. The different crime rates narrowed in the last ten years; the study speculates that "a new citizenship law finally granting German-born descendants of guest workers German citizenship, as well as increased integration efforts (particularly in schools) and a stronger disapproval of violence" may have contributed to this narrowing.

In 2018, the interior ministry's report "Criminality in context with immigration" (German: Kriminalität im Kontext von Zuwanderung) for the first time summarized and singled out all people who entered Germany via the asylum system. The group called "immigrants" includes all asylum seekers, tolerated people, "unauthorized residents" and all those entitled to protection (subsidiary protected, contingent refugees and refugees under the Geneva Convention and asylum). The group represented roughly 2 percent of the German population by end of 2017, but was suspected of committing 8.5 percent of crimes (violations of the German alien law are not included). The numbers suggest that the differences could at least to some extent have to do with the fact that the refugees are younger and more often male than the average German. The statistics show that the asylum-group is highly overrepresented for some types of crime. They account for 14.3 percent of all suspects in crimes against life (which include murder, manslaughter and involuntary manslaughter), 12.2 percent of sexual offences, 11.4 percent of thefts and 9.7 percent of body injuries. The report also shows differences between the origin of migrants. Syrians are underrepresented as suspects, whereas citizens from most African countries, especially northern Africans are strongly overrepresented. Migrants from Afghanistan are particularly overerrepresented as suspects in sex crimes. In February 2019, all states of Germany reported an increase in the share of foreign and stateless inmates in the Prisons in Germany in the preceding 3-5 year period. In Bremen and Hamburg half the inmates were foreigners and a third in North Rhine-Westphalia.

Share of foreign nationals among 2017 crime suspects
Pickpocketing	74.4%
Forgery of official documents	55.4%
Burglaries	41.3%
Rapes and sexual assaults	37%
All types	34.7%
Social benefit fraud	34.1%
Murder and manslaughter	29.7%
Share of population	12.8%
Source: Wall Street Journal

In 2018, the Wall Street Journal analysed German crime statistics for crime suspects and found that the foreigners, overall 12.8% of the population, make up a disproportionate share of crime suspects (34.7%) in 2017. In 2017, as in previous years German citizens constituted the largest group of suspects in organised crime trials. The fraction of non-German citizen suspects increased from 67.5% to 70.7% while the fraction of German citizens decreased correspondingly. For the German citizens, 14.9% had a different citizenship at birth.

According to statistics collected by the German Federal Criminal Police Office (BKA), the number of immigrants suspects of sexual offenses in Germany has gone up in absolute numbers, while simultaneously the number of German perpetrators has gone down. At least one immigrant was identified as a suspect in 3404 sexual offense cases in 2016, which were twice as many as the previous year.

From 2016 to 2017, the number of crimes committed by foreigners in Germany decreased from 950000 to 700000, a 23% reduction. According to Interior Minister Horst Seehofer, the reduction was largely due to fewer illegal immigrants arriving or remaining in the country. DW reported in 2006 that in Berlin, young male immigrants are three times more likely to commit violent crimes than their German peers. Hans-Jörg Albrecht, director of the Max Planck Institute for Foreign and International Criminal law in Freiburg, stated that the "one over-riding factor in youth crime [was] peer group pressure." Whereas the Gastarbeiter in the 50s and 60s did not have an elevated crime rate, second- and third-generation of immigrants had significantly higher crime rates.

=== Greece ===
Illegal immigration to Greece has increased rapidly over the past several years. Tough immigration policies in Spain and Italy and agreements with their neighboring African countries to combat illegal immigration have changed the direction of African immigration flows toward Greece. At the same time, flows from Asia and the Middle East—mainly Pakistan, Afghanistan, Iraq, and Bangladesh—to Greece appear to have increased as well. By 2012, it was estimated that more than 1 million illegal immigrants entered Greece. The evidence now indicates that nearly all illegal immigration to the European Union flows through the country's porous borders. In 2010, 90 percent of all apprehensions for unauthorized entry into the European Union took place in Greece, compared to 75 percent in 2009 and 50 percent in 2008.

In 2010, 132,524 persons were arrested for "illegal entry or stay" in Greece, a sharp increase from 95,239 in 2006. Nearly half of those arrested (52,469) were immediately deported, the majority of them being Albanians. Official statistics show that immigrants are responsible for about half of the criminal activity in Greece.

=== Ireland ===
Foreigners are under-represented in the Irish prison population, according to 2010 figures.

=== Italy ===
A 2023 study of Italian towns found the immigration did not increase the probability of crime occurring, just the perception that residents were in more danger of crime, especially when migrants were more culturally distant.

According to the ISPI, the Italian prison population in 2018 counted 59655 and of those 34% were foreigners, with the largest groups coming from Morocco (3751), Albania (2568), Romania (2561), Tunisia (2070) and Nigeria (1453). A study of immigration to Italy during the period 1990–2003 found that the size of immigrant population is positively correlated with the incidence of most types of crime, as well as with the overall number of criminal offenses. However, the causal effect seems limited to some categories of crime: murders, robberies and, to a lesser extent, thefts. Over the period 2007–2016, the crime rate among non-Italians decreased by around 65%.

A study of Italy before and after the January 2007 European Union enlargement found that giving legal status to the previously illegal immigrants from the new EU members states led to a "50 percent reduction in recidivism". The authors find that "legal status... explains one-half to two-thirds of the observed differences in crime rates between legal and illegal immigrants". A study on the 2007 so-called "click day" amnesty for undocumented immigrants in Italy found that the amnesty reduced the immigrant crime rate. The authors estimate "that a ten percent increase in the share of immigrants legalized in one region would imply a 0.3 percent reduction in immigrants' criminal charges in the following year in that same region". Research shows that stricter enforcement of migration policy leads to a reduction in the crime rate of undocumented migrants.

According to the latest report by Idos/Unar, immigrants made up 32,6% of prison population in 2015 (four percentage points less than five years before), immigrants making up 8,2% of population in 2015. Prison population data may not give a reliable picture of immigrants' involvement in criminal activity due to different bail and sentencing decisions for foreigners. Foreigners are, for instance, far more overrepresented in the prison population than their share of convictions relative to the native population. According to a 2013 study, the majority of foreign prisoners are held in connection with a drug offence. One out of every nine offences ascribed to foreign prisoners concerns violation of 'laws governing foreigners'. The 2013 study cites literature that points to discriminatory practices against foreigners by Italian law enforcement, judiciary and penal system.

According to a 2013 report, "undocumented immigrants are responsible for the vast majority of crimes committed in Italy by immigrants... the share of undocumented immigrants varies between 60 and 70 percent for violent crimes, and it increases to 70–85 for property crime. In 2009, the highest shares are in burglary (85), car theft (78), theft (76), robbery (75), assaulting public officer / resisting arrest (75), handling stolen goods (73)." The 2013 report observes that "immigrants accounted for almost 23 percent of the criminal charges although they represented only 6‐7 percent of the resident population" in 2010.

According to 2007 data, the crime rate of legal immigrants was 1.2–1.4% whereas the crime rate was 0.8% for native Italians. The overrepresentation is partly due to the large number of young legal immigrants, the crime rate is 1.9% for legal immigrants aged 18–44 whereas it is 1.5% for their Italian peers; 0.4% for legal immigrants aged 45–64 years whereas it is 0.7% for their Italian peers; and for those over 65 years old, the crime rates is the same among natives and foreigners. 16.9% of crimes committed by legal immigrants aged 18–44 are linked to violations of immigration laws. By excluding those crimes, the crime rate of legal immigrants aged 18–44 is largely the same as that of same aged Italians.

A 2016 report by Confcommercio found that between 2010 and 2014, illegal immigrants committed crimes at approximately 57 times the rate of Italians, and 29 times the rate of other foreigners, though it also found that immigration reduces the crime rate when it is characterized by participation and integration.

=== Netherlands ===
Allochtoon Dutch youths, especially young Antillean and Surinamese Rotterdammers, are more often suspected of crime by the police than other youths. More than half of Moroccan-Dutch male youths aged 18 to 24 years in Rotterdam have ever been suspected of crimes by the police, while among Netherlands-born youth aged from 18 to 24, 18% have been in contact with the judiciary. According to a 2009 report commissioned by Justice Minister Ernst Hirsch Ballin, 63% of the 447 teenagers convicted of serious crime are children of parents born outside the Netherlands. All these cases concern crime for which the maximum jail sentence is longer than eight years, such as robbery with violence, extortion, arson, public acts of violence, sexual assault, manslaughter and murder. The ethnic composition of the perpetrators was: native Dutch – 37%; Moroccans – 14%; Unknown origin – 14%; "other non-Westerners" – 9%; Turkish – 8%; Surinamese – 7%; Antillean – 7%; and "other Westerners" – 4%. In the majority of cases, the judges did not consider the serious offences to be grave enough to necessitate an unconditional jail sentence.

Analysis of police data for 2002 by ethnicity showed that 37.5 percent of all crime suspects living in the Netherlands were of foreign origin (including those of the second generation), almost twice as high as the share of immigrants in the Dutch population. The highest rates per capita were found among first and second generation male migrants of a non‐Western background. Of native male youths between the ages of 18 and 24, in 2002 2.2% were arrested, of all immigrant males of the same age 4.4%, of second generation non-Western males 6.4%. The crime rates for so‐called 'Western migrants' were very close to those of the native Dutch. In all groups, the rates for women were considerably lower than for men, lower than one percent, with the highest found among second generation non‐western migrants, 0.9% (Blom et al. 2005: 31).

For Moroccan immigrants, whether they originate from the underdeveloped parts of Morocco has a modest impact on their crime rate. One study finds that "crime rates in the Netherlands are higher among Moroccans who come from the countryside and the Rif, or whose parents do, than among those who come from the urban provinces in Morocco and from outside the Rif, or whose parents do." In 2015, individuals with a Moroccan background were, not taking their age into account, almost six times as likely to be suspected for a crime compared to the native Dutch. Of the first generation 2.52% was suspected of a crime, of the second generation 7.36%, of males 7.78% and women 1.34%.

Using 2015 data, Statistics Netherlands concluded that non-Western male immigrant youths had been relatively often suspected of a crime: 5.42% in the group aged between 18 and 24, compared with 1.92% for native Dutch of the same age. For both male and female non-Western immigrants of all ages combined the numbers were 2.4% for the first generation and 4.54% for the second. The absolute crime rate had dropped by almost a half since the early twenty-first century, for both native Dutch and non-western immigrants. A study found the estimated security costs per person due to the costs of criminal justice for prosecution, trial and prison attributed to the number of persons at each stage showed in 2016 large differences with the region of origin of immigrants, with low security costs on average for immigrants from Scandinavia, United Kingdom, Indonesia and East Asia. In 2017, a study concluded that asylum seekers in the Netherlands were less criminal than native Dutch with the same combination of age, gender and socio-economic position.

=== Norway ===
According to an analysis of 1998–2002 crime statistics, non-Western immigrants were overrepresented for violent crime, economic crime and traffic violations. According to data released by the European Council, 341 out of the year 2000 prison inmate population of 2643 were foreign nationals, a share of 12.9%. In the year 2010 foreign nationals represented 1129 out of a 3636 total, a 31.1% share. These figures were corroborated by officials of the Norwegian Correctional Service which stated the rising trend escalated when 8 countries joined the Schengen Area in 2007. In order to decrease costs for interpreters and other special needs of foreign inmates, foreign nationals serving sentences involving subsequent deportation were in 2012 incarcerated in an institution holding only foreigners as they are not intended to be re-integrated into Norwegian society. This institution opened in December 2012 in Kongsvinger.

In September 2016, Norwegian authorities discovered that more than a million identity papers had been issued without stringent checks which enabled fraudsters to claim social welfare benefits of many persons simultaneously. 2007 was the first time when foreign perpetrators of partner murders were in the majority. While 13% of Norway's population are foreigners, they represent 47% of perpetrators who have murdered their partner. The most prevalent countries of origin were: Iran & Kurdistan, Afghanistan, Iraq, Somalia and Eritrea. In 2018, an investigation into court cases involving domestic violence against children showed that 47% of the cases involved parents who were both born abroad. According to a researcher at Norwegian Police University College the over-representation was due to cultural (honor culture) and legal differences in Norway and foreign countries.

=== Spain ===
A 2008 study finds that the rates of crimes committed by immigrants are substantially higher than nationals. The study finds that "the arrival of immigrants has resulted in a lack of progress in the reduction of offences against property and in a minor increase in the number of offences against Collective Security (i.e. drugs and trafficking). In the case of nationals, their contribution to the increase in the crime rate is primarily concentrated in offences against persons." By controlling for socioeconomic and demographic factors, the gap between immigrants and natives is reduced but not fully. The authors also find "that a higher proportions of American, non-UE European, and African immigrants tend to widen the crime differential, the effect being larger for the latter ones". The same paper provides supports for the notion that labour market conditions impact the relationship between crime and immigration. Cultural differences were also statistically detected. This study has been criticized for not using strong instruments for identifying causality: the "instruments (lagged values of the covariates and measures of the service share of GDP in a province) are not convincing in dealing with the endogeneity of migrant location choice." Spanish National Statistics Institute (INE) published a study that analyzes records in the Register of Convicted in 2008. The data show that immigrants are overrepresented in the crime statistics: 70% of all crimes were committed by Spaniards and 30% by foreigners. Foreigners make up 15% of the population.

=== Sweden ===
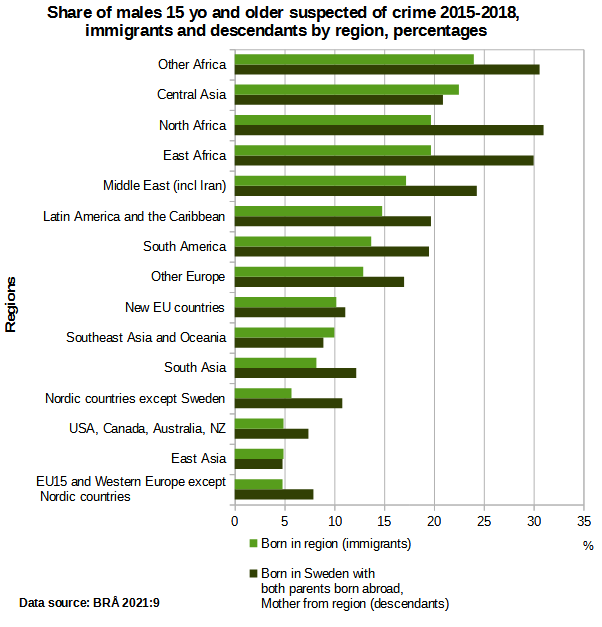
Data source: Swedish National Council of Crime Prevention (Swedish: Brottsförebyggande Rådet or BRÅ)

Those with immigrant background are over-represented in Swedish crime statistics. Research shows that socioeconomic factors, such as unemployment, poverty, exclusion, language, and other skills explain most of difference in crime rates between immigrants and natives. In 2022, Annika Lindberg of the University of Gothenburg said that in Sweden there has been a "sort of merging of migration and crime in discourse" even though there is "no sort of research showing that there exists such a causal kind of relationship."

According to the vice National Police Commissioner of the Swedish Police Authority, intelligence gathered by police showed that there are about 40 ethnic crime clans in Sweden who came to the country in order to pursue organized crime. They are primarily settled in Stockholm, Södertälje, Gothenburg, Malmö, Landskrona and Jönköping. In these clans, the extended family raises the children to take over the organized crime activities and they have no ambitions to become integrated into Swedish mainstream society. Swedish prime minister Stefan Löfven had long denied that crime gangs had anything to do with immigration, but in September 2020 changed his stance in an SVT interview, where he said that a large immigration led to difficulties with integration which in turn increased risk of crime.

About one third of new prison inmates in the 2011–2019 did not have Swedish citizenship, where there was an increase in the share from 29% in 2011 to 33% in 2019. A 2014 survey of several studies found that people with foreign background are, on average, two times more likely to commit crimes than those born in Sweden. This figure has remained stable since the 1970s, despite the changes in numbers of immigrants and their country of origin. Some studies reporting a link on immigration and crime have been criticized for not taking into account the population's age, employment and education level, all of which affect level of crime. In general, research that takes these factors into account does not support the idea that there is a link between immigration and crime.

==== Recent immigration to Sweden ====
Crime and immigration was one of the major themes of the 2018 Swedish general election. In 2018, Swedish Television investigative journalism show Uppdrag Granskning analysed the total of 843 district court cases from the five preceding years and found that 58% of all convicted of rape had a foreign background and 40% were born in the Middle East and Africa, with young men from Afghanistan numbering 45 stood out as being the most next most common country of birth after Sweden. When only analysing rape assault (Swedish: överfallsvåldtäkt) cases, that is cases where perpetrator and victim were not previously acquainted, 97 out of 129 were born outside Europe.

Viral falsehoods have circulated in recent years that tie immigrants and refugees to an alleged surge of crime in Sweden. According to Jerzy Sarnecki, a criminologist at Stockholm University, "What we're hearing is a very, very extreme exaggeration based on a few isolated events, and the claim that it's related to immigration is more or less not true at all." A 2020 pan European comparative study conducted by the Swedish National Council for Crime Prevention showed that if reported and cleared rapes are measured in a comparable way, the number of rapes in Sweden are close to the European average. According to Klara Selin, a sociologist at the National Council for Crime Prevention, the major reasons why Sweden has a higher rate of rape than other countries is due to the way in which Sweden documents rape ("if a woman reports being raped multiple times by her husband that's recorded as multiple rapes, for instance, not just one report") and a culture where women are encouraged to report rapes. Stina Holmberg at the National Council for Crime Prevention, noted that "there is no basis for drawing the conclusion that crime rates are soaring in Sweden and that that is related to immigration".

In 2017, FactCheck.Org noted that "experts said there is no evidence of a major crime wave." According to official statistics, the reported crime rate in Sweden has risen since 2005 whereas annual government surveys show that the number of Swedes experiencing crime remain steady since 2005, even as Sweden has taken in hundreds of thousands of immigrants and refugees over the same period. Jerzy Sarnecki, a criminologist at the University of Stockholm, said foreign-born residents are twice as likely to be registered for a crime as native Swedes but that other factors beyond place of birth are at play, such as education level and poverty, and that similar trends occur in European countries that have not taken in a lot of immigrants in recent years.

According to data gathered by Swedish police from October 2015 to January 2016, 5,000 police calls out of 537,466 involved asylum seekers and refugees. According to Felipe Estrada, professor of criminology at Stockholm University, this shows how the media gives disproportionate attention to and exaggerates the alleged criminal involvement of asylum seekers and refugees. Henrik Selin, head of the Department for Intercultural Dialogue at the Swedish Institute, noted that allegations of a surge in immigrant crime after the intake of more than 160,000 immigrants in 2015 have been "highly exaggerated... there is nothing to support the claim that the crime rate took off after the 160,000 came in 2015." While it's true that immigrants have been over-represented among those committing crimes—particularly in some suburban communities heavily populated by immigrants, he said—the issue of crime and immigration is complex. Speaking in February 2017, Manne Gerell, a doctoral student in criminology at Malmö University, noted that while immigrants where disproportionately represented among crime suspects, many of the victims of immigrant crimes were other immigrants.

A Swedish Police report from May 2016 found that there have been 123 incidents of sexual molestation in the country's public baths and pools in 2015 (112 of them were directed against girls). In 55% of cases, the perpetrator could be reasonably identified. From these identified perpetrators, 80% were of foreign origin. The same report found 319 cases of sexual assault on public streets and parks in 2015. In these cases, only 17 suspected perpetrators have been identified, 4 of them Swedish nationals with the remainder being of foreign origin. Another 17 were arrested, but not identified.

In March 2018, newspaper Expressen investigated gang rape court cases from the two preceding years and found that there were 43 men having been convicted. Their average age was 21 and 13 were under the age of 18 when the crime was committed. Of the convicted, 40 out of the 43 were either immigrants (born abroad) or born in Sweden to immigrant parents. Another investigation by newspaper Aftonbladet found that of 112 men and boys convicted for gang rape since July 2012, 82 were born outside Europe. The median age of the victims was 15, while 7 out of 10 perpetrators were between 15 and 20. According to professor Christian Diesen, a foreigner may have a lower threshold to commit sexual assault due to having grown up in a misogynist culture where all women outside the home are interpreted as available. Also professor Henrik Tham stated that there was a clear over-representatation of foreigners and cultural differences, while also adding that few cultures allow such behaviour. Professor Jerzy Sarnecki instead emphasized socioeconomic factors and that police may be more diligient in investigating crimes by foreigners.

A 2024 study by Lund University found that nearly two thirds of convicted rapists in Sweden since 2000 were first or second generation immigrants.

==== Past immigration to Sweden ====
A 2005 study by the Swedish National Council for Crime Prevention found that people of foreign background were 2.5 times more likely to be suspected of crimes than people with a Swedish background, including immigrants being four times more likely to be suspected of for lethal violence and robbery, five times more likely to be investigated for sex crimes, and three times more likely to be investigated for violent assault. The report was based on statistics for those "suspected" of offences. The Council for Crime Prevention said that there was "little difference" in the statistics for those suspected of crimes and those actually convicted. A 2006 government report suggests that immigrants face discrimination by law enforcement, which could lead to meaningful differences between those suspected of crimes and those actually convicted. A 2008 report by the Swedish National Council for Crime Prevention finds evidence of discrimination towards individuals of foreign descent in the Swedish judicial system. The 2005 report finds that immigrants who entered Sweden during early childhood have lower crime rates than other immigrants. By taking account of socioeconomic factors (gender, age, education and income), the crime rate gap between immigrants and natives decreases. A 2013 study done by Stockholm University argued that designs like BRÅ 2005 may bias results by controlling for adult education and income, which may be influenced by prior offending. The authors furthermore found "that culture is unlikely to be a strong cause of crime among immigrants".

A study published in 1997 attempted to explain the higher than average crime rates among immigrants to Sweden. It found that between 20 and 25 percent of asylum seekers to Sweden had experienced physical torture, and many suffered from post-traumatic stress disorder. Other refugees had witnessed a close relative being killed. The 2005 study reported that persons from North Africa and Western Asia were over-represented in crime statistics, whereas a 1997 paper additionally found immigrants from Finland, South America, Arab world and Eastern Europe to be over-represented in crime statistics. Studies have found that native-born Swedes with high levels of unemployment are also over-represented in crime statistics.

A 1996 report by the Swedish National Council for Crime Prevention determined that between 1985 and 1989 individuals born in Iraq, North Africa (Algeria, Libya, Morocco and Tunisia), Africa (excluding Uganda and the North African countries), other Middle East (Jordan, Palestine, Syria), Iran and Eastern Europe (Romania, Bulgaria) were convicted of rape at rates 20, 23, 17, 9, 10 and 18 greater than individuals born in Sweden respectively. A 2013 study argued that BRÅ 2005's reliance on adult education and income as controls was problematic, since those factors may themselves be affected by earlier offending, but it did not make the same criticism of the 1996 report.

A 2013 study found that both first- and second-generation immigrants have a higher rate of suspected offenses than indigenous Swedes. While first-generation immigrants have the highest offender rate, the offenders have the lowest average number of offenses, which indicates that there is a high rate of low-rate offending (many suspected offenders with only one single registered offense). The rate of chronic offending (offenders suspected of several offenses) is higher among indigenous Swedes than first-generation immigrants. Second-generation immigrants have higher rates of chronic offending than first-generation immigrants but lower total offender rates.

=== Switzerland ===
In Switzerland, 69.7% of the prison population did not have Swiss citizenship, compared to 22.1% of total resident population (as of 2008). The figure of arrests by residence status is not usually made public. In 1997, when there were for the first time more foreigners than Swiss among the convicts under criminal law (out of a fraction of 20.6% of the total population at the time), a special report was compiled by the Federal Department of Justice and Police (published in 2001) which for the year 1998 found an arrest rate per 1000 adult population of 2.3 for Swiss citizens, 4.2 for legally resident aliens and 32 for asylum seekers. 21% of arrests made concerned individuals with no residence status, who were thus either sans papiers or "crime tourists" without any permanent residence in Switzerland.

A 2019 study found that asylum seekers exposed to civil conflict and mass killing during childhood were 35% more prone to violent crimes than co-national asylum seekers who were not exposed to conflict. The conflict exposed cohorts have a higher propensity to target victims from their own nationality. Offering labor market access to the asylum seekers eliminates two-thirds of effect of conflict exposure on crime propensity.

In 2010, a statistic was published which listed delinquency by nationality (based on 2009 data). To avoid distortions due to demographic structure, only the male population aged between 18 and 34 was considered for each group. From the study, it became clear that crime rate is highly correlated on the country of origin of the various migrant groups. Thus, immigrants from Germany, France and Austria had a significantly lower crime rate than Swiss citizens (60% to 80%), while immigrants from Angola, Nigeria and Algeria had a crime rate of above 600% of that of Swiss population. In between these extremes were immigrants from Former Yugoslavia, with crime rates of between 210% and 300% of the Swiss value.

A 2023 study suggests that the increase in fear of immigrant crime in Switzerland was significantly impacted by potentially biased media coverage sensationalizing the issue.

=== Turkey ===
A 2022 study has shown that Syrian refugees have no significant effect on crime rates in Turkey.

=== United Kingdom ===
Historically, Irish immigrants to the United Kingdom in the eighteenth and nineteenth centuries were considered over-represented amongst those appearing in court. Research suggests that policing strategy may have put immigrants at a disadvantage by targeting only the most public forms of crime, while locals were more likely able to engage in the types of crimes that could be conducted behind locked doors. An analysis of historical courtroom records suggests that despite higher rates of arrest, immigrants were not systematically disadvantaged by the British court system in the eighteenth and nineteenth centuries.

On 30 June 2022 there were 9,682 prisoners from 164 different countries in the jails of England and Wales. Albania, Poland and Romania formed the highest percentage of foreign nationals in UK prisons. In total, foreigners represented 12% of the prison population, whereas foreign nationals are 13% of the total population in England and Wales. During the 2000s, there was a 111% increase of foreign nationals in UK prisons. According to one study, "there is little evidence to support the theory that the foreign national prison population continues to grow because foreign nationals are more likely to commit crime than are British citizens or more likely to commit crime of a serious nature". The increase may partly be due to the disproportionate number of convicted for drug offences; crimes associated with illegal immigration (fraud and forgery of government documents, and immigration offenses); ineffective deportation provisions; and a lack of viable options to custody (which affects bail and sentencing decision making).

Research has found no evidence of an average causal impact of immigration on crime in the United Kingdom. One study based on evidence from England and Wales in the 2000s found no evidence of an average causal impact of immigration on crime in England and Wales. No causal impact and no immigrant differences in the likelihood of being arrested were found for London, which saw large immigration changes. A 2017 study offered qualified support for the notion that immigration had contributed to declining crime rates in the UK. A study of two large waves of immigration to the UK (the late 1990s/early 2000s asylum seekers and the post-2004 inflow from EU accession countries) found that the "first wave led to a modest but significant rise in property crime, while the second wave had a small negative impact. There was no effect on violent crime; arrest rates were not different, and changes in crime cannot be ascribed to crimes against immigrants. The findings are consistent with the notion that differences in labor market opportunities of different migrant groups shape their potential impact on crime." A 2013 study found "that crime is significantly lower in those neighborhoods with sizeable immigrant population shares" and that "the crime reducing effect is substantially enhanced if the enclave is composed of immigrants from the same ethnic background." A 2014 study of property crimes based on the Crime and Justice Survey (CJS) of 2003, (a national representative survey where respondents in England and Wales were asked questions regarding their criminal activities), after taking into account the under-reporting of crimes, even found that "immigrants who are located in London and black immigrants are significantly less criminally active than their native counterparts". Another 2014 study found that "areas that have witnessed the greatest percentage of recent immigrants arriving since 2004 have not witnessed higher levels of robbery, violence, or sex offending" but have "experienced higher levels of drug offenses."

A 2008 study found that the crime rate of Eastern European immigrants was the same as that of the indigenous population.

An analysis of data by The Telegraph in 2024 found that the overall imprisonment rate of foreign nationals was 27 per cent higher than for British citizens. A 2025 analysis by the Centre for Migration Control, an anti-immigration think tank, found that non-British citizens were around 3.5 times more likely than British citizens to be arrested for sexual offenses.

According to the data from the Ministry of Justice, obtained under freedom of information laws, foreign nationals have disproportionately committed sex crimes between 2021 and 2023. Afghans and Eritreans – were more than 20 times more likely to account for sexual offence convictions than British citizens, according to the data. Overall, foreign nationals were 71 per cent more likely than Britons to be responsible for sex crime convictions. In terms of overall crime nationals from Albania topped the crime league table; followed by Moldova, Congo, Namibia and Somalia.

Official GOV.UK data for the period of April 2022 to March 2023 has the arrest rate for White British at 9.2 per every 1,000 people. This compares to 2.8 for Chinese, 11.3 for Pakistani, 22.7 for Black Caribbean, and 52.4 for Black other.

Data from the Ministry of Justice (MoJ), drawn from the Police National Computer and obtained under freedom of information laws, showed that 26 per cent of the 1,453 sex assault convictions on women in 2024 were accounted for by foreign nationals. A further 8 per cent were committed by offenders of "unknown" nationalities, a category which will include some foreign nationals, meaning the overall proportion could be higher.

A House of Commons report from July 2024 shows that foreign nationals make up 10% of the prison population, form over 168 countries, with the largest section being those born within EEA European countries.

Criminals from just three countries account for 40 per cent of foreign prisoners in Scotland's jails, according to analysis of official figures via Scottish Prison Service (SPS) data. Just over four in 10 of the total were from just three countries – Albania, Poland and Vietnam. More than a quarter (26.3 per cent) of Eritreans living in Scotland are estimated to be in prison and more than one in five (21.9 per cent) Somalians. Almost one in six Albanians (15.8 per cent) and Vietnamese (15.2 per cent) people living in Scotland are estimated to be imprisoned, according to comparison of census and SPS data.

== Americas ==
=== Canada ===
A 2014 study found that immigration reduced the property crime rate in Canada: "new immigrants do not have a significant impact on property crime rates, but as they stay longer, more established immigrants actually decrease property crime rates significantly."

=== Chile ===
A 2020 study found no relationship between immigration and crime in Chile. A 2023 study found media competition as a possible driver of the increasing fear of immigrant crime despite crime not increasing.

=== United States ===
Research in the United States tends to suggest either that immigration has no impact on the crime rate or even that immigrants are less prone to crime. Some research finds that immigration, both legal and illegal might actually reduce crime. A meta-analysis of 51 studies from 1994 to 2014 on the relationship between immigration and crime in the United States found that, overall, the immigration-crime association is slightly negative with significant variation across studies. This aligns with a 2009 review of high-quality studies conducted in the United States that also found a negative relationship.

==== Early 20th century ====
One of the first political analyses in the U.S. of the relationship between immigration and crime was performed in the beginning of the 20th century by the Dillingham Commission. The Commission found a relationship especially for immigrants from non-Northern European countries, resulting in the sweeping 1920s immigration reduction acts, including the Emergency Quota Act of 1921 and Immigration Act of 1924, which favored immigration from Northern and Northwestern Europe over the supposedly criminally-inclined immigrants from Southern and Eastern Europe (i.e., mainly Italians, as well as certain Slavs and Jews from Eastern Europe). Recent research is skeptical of the conclusion drawn by the commission. One study finds that, "major government commissions on immigration and crime in the early twentieth century relied on evidence that suffered from aggregation bias and the absence of accurate population data, which led them to present partial and sometimes misleading views of the immigrant-native criminality comparison. With improved data and methods, we find that in 1904, prison commitment rates for more serious crimes were quite similar by nativity for all ages except ages 18 and 19, for which the commitment rate for immigrants was higher than for the native-born. By 1930, immigrants were less likely than natives to be committed to prisons at all ages 20 and older, but this advantage disappears when one looks at commitments for violent offenses."

For the early 20th century, one study found that immigrants had "quite similar" imprisonment rates for major crimes as natives in 1904 but lower for major crimes (except violent offenses; the rate was similar) in 1930. Contemporary commissions used dubious data and interpreted it in questionable ways. A study by Harvard economist Nathan Nunn, Yale economist Nancy Qian, and LSE economist Sandra Sequeira found that the 'Age of Mass Migration' (1850–1920) had no long-run effects on crime rates in the United States. Figures gathered from the records of the Court of general sessions of the New York County in November 1909, showed that 35,8% of crime convictions in the years 1904-08 concerned foreign-born individuals; in comparison, in the year 1900 42.2% of the county's population was foreign-born, and was estimated to be "a few points higher" during the 1904-08 time interval, due to high immigration. The demographics were broken down as following:

==== Late 20th and early 21st century ====
Most studies in the U.S. have found lower crime rates among immigrants than among non-immigrants, and that higher concentrations of immigrants are associated with lower crime rates. Likewise, a 2018 paper found no statistically significant evidence that refugees to the United States have an impact on crime rates. A separate 2018 paper by scholars at Stanford University's Immigration Policy Lab found that U.S. President Donald Trump's refugee ban (which caused a 66% reduction in refugee resettlement) had no impact on crime rates. A 2015 study conducted by Aaron Chalfin of the American Economic Review had found that an increase in immigration in the 1990s saw a decline in US crime rates. It was largely attributed to a reluctance from immigrants to report crimes in fear that they would testify to police. In the only state that tracks a person's immigration status, Texas, illegal immigrants were convicted of crimes 45% less than native-born Americans.

For men between the ages of 18 and 39, the demographic with the highest propensity for crime, the incarceration rate for immigrants is one-fourth that of native-born Americans. These findings contradict popular perceptions that immigration increases crime. Some research even suggests that increases in immigration may partly explain the reduction in the U.S. crime rate. A 2017 study suggests that immigration did not play a significant part in lowering the crime rate. A 2005 study showed that immigration to large U.S. metropolitan areas does not increase, and in some cases decreases, crime rates there. A 2009 study found that recent immigration was not associated with homicide in Austin, Texas. The low crime rates of immigrants to the United States despite having lower levels of education, lower levels of income and residing in urban areas (factors that should lead to higher crime rates) may be due to lower rates of antisocial behavior among immigrants. This phenomenon is known as the immigrant paradox, in which immigrants have better health and behavioral outcomes despite socio-economic disadvantage. A 2015 study estimated that Mexican immigration to metropolitan statistical areas significantly increased aggravated assaults and decreased rape, larceny and motor vehicle theft. Another 2015 study found no significant influence of rates of immigrant presence on homicide in cities. A 2016 study finds no link between immigrant populations and violent crime, although there is a small but significant association between undocumented immigrants and drug-related crime. A 2020 study found that native-born US citizens are incarcerated at higher rates for homicide in Texas than undocumented immigrants.

Multiple studies have found that undocumented immigration to the United States do not increase violent crime. A 2017 study found that "Increased undocumented immigration was significantly associated with reductions in drug arrests, drug overdose deaths, and DUI arrests, net of other factors." Research finds that Secure Communities, an immigration enforcement program that led to a quarter of a million of detentions, had no observable impact on the crime rate. A 2015 study found that the 1986 Immigration Reform and Control Act (IRCA), which legalized almost 3 million immigrants, led to "decreases in crime of 3–5 percent, primarily due to decline in property crimes, equivalent to 120,000–180,000 fewer violent and property crimes committed each year due to legalization." Research has found no statistically significant effect on crime for sanctuary cities—which adopt policies designed to not prosecute people solely for being an undocumented immigrant. A 2018 study in the American Economic Journal: Economic Policy found that by restricting the employment opportunities for unauthorized immigrants, IRCA likely caused an increase in crime. Even second-generation immigrants are not more crime-prone than other native-born children.

U.S. Immigration and Customs Enforcement reported the number of non-citizens encountered on the border and are currently non-detained which were convicted of assault was 62,231, convicted of homicide was 13,099, convicted of kidnapping was 2,521, convicted of robbery was 10,031 and convicted of sexual assault was 15,811 as of July 21, 2024.

==== Terrorism ====
According to a review by The Washington Post fact-checker of the available research and evidence, there is nothing to support President Trump's claim that "the vast majority of individuals convicted of terrorism-related offenses since 9/11 came here from outside of our country." The fact-checker noted that the Government Accountability Office had found that "of the 85 violent extremist incidents that resulted in death since September 12, 2001, 73 percent (62) were committed by far-right-wing violent extremist groups, and 27 percent (23) by radical Islamist violent extremists." A bulletin by the FBI and Department of Homeland Security also warned in May 2017 that white supremacist groups were "responsible for a lion's share of violent attacks among domestic extremist groups." According to a report by the New America foundation, of the individuals credibly involved in radical Islamist-inspired activity in the United States since 9/11, the large majority were US-born citizens, not immigrants.

A 2020 study found little evidence of a relationship between unauthorized immigration and terrorism. Studies have found that refugee settlements in the United States have no impact on terrorism or crime.

==== Criminal gangs ====
Tren de Aragua began emerging throughout the United States during the administration of President Joe Biden, which saw a surge of migrants crossing the Mexico-U.S. border, particularly from Venezuela. Telemundo, citing multiple criminal cases against suspected members of the gang, wrote in March 2024 that it shows "an increasingly widespread presence of the band also in the United States." In January 2024, the Federal Bureau of Investigation confirmed reports that the gang was operating in the United States. On July 11, 2024, the US Treasury Department and the White House announced sanctions against the gang and designated it a "transnational criminal organization". The State Department is also offering a $12 million reward for information leading to the arrest of the organization's leaders. In 2024, U.S. officials at the U.S.-Mexico border implemented enhanced interviews of single Venezuelan male migrants in order to screen for Tren de Aragua members. Tren de Aragua members have been linked to crimes throughout the United States, including murders.

Tren de Aragua first appeared in Chicago and its suburbs in October 2023. In New York City, the gang has been linked to shootings, thefts in retail stores, street robberies, forced prostitution, extortion, and drug dealing. Members of the gang frequently live or have lived in the city's migrant shelters. The New York Times reported that Tren de Aragua is believed to recruit new gang members from within the migrant shelters. FBI agents in El Paso, Texas reported that 41 suspected members of the Tren de Aragua were arrested in 2023.

== Oceania ==
=== Australia ===
A 2019 study found no impact of immigration on crime rates in Australia. Foreigners are under-represented in the Australian prison population, according to 2010 figures. A 1987 report by the Australian Institute of Criminology noted that studies had consistently found that migrant populations in Australia had lower crime rates than the Australian-born population.

The alleged link between immigration and criminality has been a longstanding meme in Australian history with many of the original immigrants being convicts. During the 1950s and 1960s, the majority of emigrants to the country arrived from Italy and Greece, and were shortly afterwards associated with local crime. This culminated in the "Greek conspiracy case" of the 1970s, when Greek physicians were accused of defrauding the Medibank system. The police were later found to have conducted investigations improperly, and the doctors were eventually cleared of all charges. After the demise of the White Australia policy restricting non-European immigration, the first large settler communities from Asia emerged. This development was accompanied by a moral panic regarding a potential spike in criminal activity by the Triads and similar organizations. In 1978, the erstwhile weekly The National Times also reported on involvement in the local drug trade by Calabrian Italian, Turkish, Lebanese and Chinese dealers.

Discourse surrounding immigrant crime reached a head in the late 1990s. The fatal stabbing of a Korean teenager in Punchbowl in October 1998 followed by a drive-by shooting of the Lakemba police station prompted then New South Wales Premier Bob Carr and NSW Police Commissioner Peter Ryan to blame the incidents on Lebanese gangs. Spurred on by the war on terror, immigrant identities became increasingly criminalized in the popular Sydney media. By the mid-2000s and the outbreak of the Cronulla riots, sensationalist broadcast and tabloid media representations had reinforced existing stereotypes of immigrant communities as criminal entities and ethnic enclaves as violent and dangerous areas.

The only reliable statistics on immigrant crime in Australia are based on imprisonment rates by place of birth. As of 1999, this data indicated that immigrants from Vietnam (2.7 per 1,000 of population), Lebanon (1.6) and New Zealand (1.6) were over-represented within the national criminal justice system. Compared to the Australian-born (1), immigrants from Italy (0.6), the United Kingdom (0.6), Ireland (0.6) and Greece (0.5) were under-represented.

Victoria Police said in 2012 that Sudanese immigrants around are five times more likely to commit crimes than other state residents. The rate of offending in the Sudanese community was 7109.1 per 100,000 individuals, and 1301.0 per 100,000 for the wider Victoria community. Robbery and assault said to have been the most common types of crime committed by the Sudanese residents, with assault purported to represent 29.5% and 24.3% of all offences, respectively. The overall proportion of crime in the state said to have been committed by members of the Sudanese community was 0.92 percent.People born in Sudan are around 0.1percent, respectively, of Victoria's population. Journalist Dan Oakes, writing in The Age, noted that individuals arrested and charged might have been falsely claiming to belong to that community. In 2015, Sudanese-born youths were "vastly over-represented" in Victoria Police LEAP data, responsible for 7.44 per cent of alleged home invasions, 5.65 per cent of car thefts and 13.9 per cent of aggravated robberies. A similar overrepresentation occurs in Kenyan-born youths. In January 2018, Acting Chief Commissioner Shane Patton that there was an "issue with overrepresentation by African youth in serious and violent offending as well as public disorder issues".

In 2010, six applicants brought charges of impropriety against several members of the Victorian Police, the Chief Commissioner of Victoria Police, and the State of Victoria in the Melbourne areas of Flemington and Kensington. The ensuing Haile-Michael v Konstantinidis case alleged various forms of mistreatment by the public officials in violation of the Racial Discrimination Act 1975. In March 2012, an order of discovery was made, whereby established statistician Ian Gordon of the University of Melbourne independently analysed Victorian Police LEAP data from Flemington and North Melbourne (2005–2008). The report concluded that residents from Africa were two and a half times more likely to be subjected to an arbitrary "stop and search" than their representation in the population. Although the justification provided for such disproportionate policing measures was over-representation in local crime statistics, the study found that the same police LEAP data in reality showed that male immigrants from Africa on average committed substantially less crime than male immigrants from other backgrounds. Despite this, the latter alleged male offenders were observed to be 8.5 times more likely not to be the subject of a police "field contact". The case was eventually settled on 18 February 2013, with a landmark agreement that the Victoria Police would publicly review its "field contact" and training processes. The inquiry is expected to help police identify areas where discrimination in the criminal justice system has the potential to or does occur; implement institutional reforms as pre-emptive measures in terms of training, policy and practice; predicate changes on international law enforcement best practices; ammeliorate the local police's interactions with new immigrants and ethnic minorities, as well as with the Aboriginal community; and serve as a benchmark for proper conduct vis-a-vis other police departments throughout the country.

=== New Zealand ===
Foreigners are under-represented in the New Zealand prison population, according to 2010 figures.

== See also ==
- High-trust and low-trust societies
- Opposition to immigration
- Youth bulge
- Gangs in the United States
- Race and crime
