= Hicks-Tinbergen Award =

The Hicks-Tinbergen Award is a biennial prize in economics awarded by the European Economic Association (EEA) to the author(s) of the best article published in the EEA's journal within the two preceding years.

== History ==
The Hicks-Tinbergen Award was created in 1991 and is named in honour of the Dutch econometrician Jan Tinbergen and the British economist John Hicks to show that the EEA supports both theoretical and empirical economic research in Europe. Until 2002, the journal of the EEA was the European Economic Review, which was subsequently replaced by the Journal of the European Economic Association. The Hicks-Tinbergen Award is generally awarded at the EEA's Annual Congress, after a committee of three economists has selected the winner among the nominations submitted by EEA members.

=== Past Recipients ===
A complete list of the past recipients of the Hicks-Tinbergen Award can be found on the website of the EEA.

Year	Recipients	Publication
1992	Anton Barten and L.J. Bettendorf	Price formation for fish: An application of an inverse demand function
1994	Robert Innes and Richard Sexton	Customer coalitions, monopoly price discrimination and generic entry deterrence
1996	Jan van Ours and Geert Ridder	Job matching and job competition: Are lower educated workers at the back of job queues?
1998	Laura Bottazzi, Paolo Pesenti and Eric van Wincoop	Wages, profits and the international portfolio puzzle
2000	Ernst Fehr, Georg Kirchsteiger and Arno Riedl	Gift exchange and reciprocity in competitive experimental markets
2002	Juan Carrillo and Thomas Mariotti	Electoral competition and politician turnover
2004	Frank Smets and Raf Wouters	An estimated dynamic stochastic general equilibrium model of the Euro Area
2006	Gary Gorton and Frank A. Schmid	Capital, labor and the firm: A study of German codetermination
2008	Botond Köszegy	Ego utility, overconfidence, and task choice
2010	Denis Fougère, Francis Kramarz and Julien Pouget	Youth unemployment and crime in France
2012	Guido Tabellini	Culture and institutions: Economic development in the regions of Europe
2014	Amy Finkelstein, Enzo Luttmer and Matthew Notowidigdo	What good is wealth without health? The effect of health on the marginal utility of consumption
2016	Riccardo Puglisi and James Snyder	The Balanced US Press
2018	Luigi Guiso, Paola Sapienza and Luigi Zingales	Long-term persistence
2020	Jose Asturias, Manuel García-Santana, and Roberto Ramos Magdaleno	Competition and the Welfare Gains from Transportation Infrastructure: Evidence from the Golden Quadrilateral in India

== See also ==
- List of economics awards
