= Research in Labor Economics =

- Discipline: Labor Economics
- Language: English
- Edited by: Solomon Polachek, Konstantinos Tatsiramos

Publication details
- History: 1977-present
- Publisher: Emerald Group Publishing and the IZA Institute of Labor Economics
- Frequency: Biannually

Standard abbreviations
- ISO 4: Res. Labor Econ.

Indexing
- ISSN: 0147-9121

Links
- Journal homepage; Online archive from volume 18

Research in Labor Economics (RLE) is a biannual series that publishes peer-reviewed research applying economic theory and econometrics to analyze policy issues. Typical themes of each volume include labor supply, work effort, schooling, on-the-job training, earnings distribution, discrimination, migration, and the effects of government policies. Research in Labor Economics is published by Emerald Group Publishing in conjunction with the IZA Institute of Labor Economics (IZA).

== History ==
The originally annual series Research in Labor Economics began in 1977 by founding editor Ronald Ehrenberg and JAI Press. It has been published by Elsevier from 1999-2007 and by Emerald Group Publishing since 2008. Solomon Polachek has been editor since 1995. Since 2006, the series is affiliated with the IZA Institute of Labor Economics (IZA) and was extended to two volumes per year. Olivier Bargain was Co-Editor 2007 and Konstantinos Tatsiramos became Co-Editor in 2008. An editorial board was established in 2011 currently consisting of Orley Ashenfelter, Francine D. Blau, Richard Blundell, David Card, Ronald Ehrenberg, Richard B. Freeman, Daniel S. Hamermesh, James J. Heckman, Edward P. Lazear, Christopher A. Pissarides and Klaus F. Zimmermann.

== Abstracting and indexing ==
Research in Labor Economics is indexed in Scopus, EconLit, Google Scholar, and RePEc.
