= Frederico S. Finan =

- Occupations: Economist, professor

Academic background
- Education: Ph.D. (2006), University of California, Berkeley

Frederico S. Finan is an American economist currently serving as the George Break and Helen Schnacke Break Distinguished Professor of Economics and Professor of Business Administration at the University of California, Berkeley.

Finan is also a research associate with NBER and a research fellow at the IZA Institute of Labor Economics. In 2013, Finan was awarded a Sloan Research Fellowship.

Finan is a co-director of the Berkeley Center for Economics and Politics, and scientific director of the Initiative on Economic Development and Institutions at CEGA.

Finan has researched corruption, politics, and institutions in economic development.
