= Nathan Nunn =

Canadian economist and the Frederic E (born 1974)

Nathan Nunn (born July 9, 1974) is a Canadian economist and professor of the Vancouver School of Economics at the University of British Columbia. He is best known for his research on the long-term effects of slave trade on Africa. His research interests include economic development, cultural economics, political economy and international trade.

== Biography ==
A native of Canada, Nathan Nunn earned first a B.A. in economics from Simon Fraser University in 1998 and then a M.A. and Ph.D. in economics from the University of Toronto in 2000 and 2005, respectively. After his graduation, Nunn worked as an assistant professor at the University of British Columbia before moving to Harvard University in 2007. There, he was promoted to the Paul Sack Associate Professorship in Political Economy in 2011, became full professor in 2012, and held the position of Frederic E. Abbe Professor of Economics from 2016 to 2022, prior to returning to the University of British Columbia. Nunn maintains affiliations with NBER, BREAD, and the CEGA. He is currently a Fellow of the Boundaries, Membership & Belonging of the Canadian Institute for Advanced Research. Moreover, Nunn currently serves as an Editor of the Quarterly Journal of Economics and was an Editor of the Journal of Development Economics from 2013 to 2019. He has also been an associate editor at the Journal of Comparative Economics, Review of Economics and Statistics, Journal of International Economics, and the Canadian Journal of Economics in the past.

== Research ==
Nathan Nunn's research focuses on economic history, economic development, cultural economics, political economy and international trade. A recurrent theme in Nunn's research is the long-term impact of historical processes on economic development, often mediated through institutions, culture, knowledge and technology. According to IDEAS/RePEc, Nathan Nunn belongs to the 2% of most cited economists. Key findings of his research include the following:

- Countries' ability to enforce contracts is possibly a more important determinant of their comparative advantage than skilled labour and physical capital combined.
- A substantial part of Africa's current underdevelopment appears to be caused by the long-term effects of the Atlantic, Indian Ocean, Trans-Saharan and Red sea slave trades.
- Current differences in trust levels within Africa are attributable to the impact of the slave trades, which have caused the emergence of low-trust cultural norms, beliefs, and values in ethnic groups heavily affected by slavery (with Leonard Wantchekon).
- By impeding not only trade and technological diffusion but also the depredations of slave traders, the ruggedness of certain African regions' terrain had a significant positive impact on these regions' development (with Diego Puga).
- The introduction of the potato within the Columbian exchange may have been responsible for at least a quarter of the population and urbanisation growth observed in the Old World between 1700 and 1900 (with Nancy Qian).
- In line with Ester Boserup's hypothesis, the introduction and historical use of plough agriculture gave men a comparative advantage in work outside of the home and made gender norms less equal. Historical differences in the plough use of immigrants' ancestral communities predict contemporary attitudes regarding gender equality (with Alberto Alesina and Paola Giuliano).
- U.S. Food Aid is driven by U.S. objectives and can lead to increased conflict in recipient countries (with Nancy Qian).
