= Arulampalam =

Arulampalam (Tamil: அருளம்பலம்) is a Tamil surname. Notable people with the surname include:

- Arunan Arulampalam (born 1985), American politician
- C. Arulampalam (1909–1997), Sri Lankan politician
- Wiji Arulampalam, British economist and professor
- Jitto Arulampalam, Australia-based business executive, investor, and fintech entrepreneur
