= Robert Innes (economist) =

American economist

- Education: University of California, Berkeley
- Occupation: Economist

Robert Innes is an American economist. He is a distinguished professor in the department of economics and business management at the University of California, Merced.

In 1994, Innes was awarded the Hicks-Tinbergen Award by the European Economic Association.
