= Alison Booth =

Australian economist

- Booth delivering the Maureen Brunt Lecture at Monash University in 2024.
- Born: Alison Lee Booth; Melbourne, Australia

Academic background
- Education: London School of Economics
- Doctoral advisor: Tony Atkinson

Academic work
- Discipline: Labour economics
- Institutions: Australian National University; University of Essex
- Website: www.alisonbooth.net; Information at IDEAS / RePEc

Alison Booth is an Australian labour economist, academic and novelist. She is an emeritus professor of economics at the Australian National University (ANU). Her research examines labour-market institutions, trade unions, training, gender differences, competition and risk preferences. She is a Fellow of the Econometric Society and the Academy of the Social Sciences in Australia. Booth has also published eight novels, including Stillwater Creek, The Philosopher's Daughters and Death at Booroomba, and has published fiction as A. L. Booth.

== Early life and education ==
Booth was born in Melbourne and grew up in Sydney. Her father, Norman Booth, wrote the Australian war novel Up the Dusty Track.

Booth studied economics at the London School of Economics, receiving a Master of Science in economics in 1980 and a PhD in 1984. Her doctoral research, supervised by Professor Sir Tony Atkinson, examined the microeconomic behaviour of trade unions and union membership.

== Career ==
Booth began her academic career as a teaching assistant at the London School of Economics from 1981 to 1983. She subsequently held lectureships at the University of Bristol, City University London, Brunel University and Birkbeck College. She was professor of economics at the University of Essex from 1995 to 2013.

In 2002, Booth joined the Australian National University (ANU), where she was professor of economics until 2014 and is now an emeritus professor. She held the F. H. Gruen Professorship from 2002 to 2003 and served as head of the Economics Program in the university's Research School of Social Sciences from 2008 to 2010. Her visiting appointments have included the Reserve Bank of Australia, the Massachusetts Institute of Technology, the University of Amsterdam and ANU.

Booth was editor-in-chief of Labour Economics from 1999 to 2004 and president of the European Association of Labour Economists from 2006 to 2008. She also served on the council of the European Society for Population Economics and on the council of the Royal Economic Society.

In 2017, Booth received the Distinguished Fellow Award from the Economic Society of Australia, and in 2019 she was elected a Fellow of the Econometric Society.

== Research ==
Booth's research is primarily in labour economics and also spans behavioural economics, experimental economics and the economics of gender. Her early work examined trade unions, wage determination, employment, redundancy payments and work-related training. Her later research has focused on gender differences in competition and risk-taking, single-sex education, labour-market discrimination, migration, and the influence of institutions and culture on economic behaviour.

In research on education and risk preferences, Booth and Patrick Nolen found that girls from single-sex schools were less risk-averse than girls from coeducational schools, which they associated with reduced exposure to gender norms. She has also studied women's willingness to take career risks when supported by other women.

Her comparative research has examined how institutions and culture influence competitive behaviour, including the effects of the Cultural Revolution in China and gender differences in competition in Japan and South Korea.

Booth and her co-authors have also studied the intergenerational effects of the Cultural Revolution, reporting lower trust and willingness to compete among descendants of people mistreated during the upheaval.

Her research on trade unions and migration found that active unions were associated with higher incomes, improved employment conditions and fewer mental-health problems among rural–urban migrant workers in China.

Booth has also investigated labour-market discrimination through callback rates for applicants with Anglo-Saxon and non-Anglo-Saxon-sounding names. She has advocated anonymous recruitment procedures while arguing that later stages of recruitment must also address bias.

== Fiction ==
Booth began writing fiction with short stories published in the United Kingdom, the United States and Australia, and has published eight novels. In a 2026 interview with ANU Reporter, she discussed parallels between economics and fiction writing.

Her debut novel, Stillwater Creek (2010), was the first volume of a trilogy set in the fictional Australian town of Jingera. A review in The Sunday Telegraph described the novel as portraying a period shaped by memories of the Second World War, fear of communism and conservative social conventions. The novel was highly commended in the 2011 ACT Book of the Year Award. It was subsequently issued in condensed form through Reader's Digest Select Editions in Australasia and the United Kingdom. It was also translated into French by Hélène Collon as Les Rivages du Souvenir and published by Presses de la Cité in 2011.

The trilogy continued with The Indigo Sky (2011), which uses Jingera to explore social and political issues in postwar Australia, including the removal of Aboriginal children and bullying. The final volume, A Distant Land (2012), is set in Jingera, Sydney and Cambodia in 1971 and addresses human rights, civil liberties and war.

Booth's later novels are A Perfect Marriage (2018), The Philosopher's Daughters (2020), The Painting (2021), Bellevue (2023) and Death at Booroomba (2025). A Perfect Marriage concerns domestic violence and its long-term effects. It was highly commended in the 2019 ACT Writing and Publishing Awards, while The Philosopher's Daughters was highly commended in the 2022 ACT Notables Awards. The Philosopher's Daughters explores race and gender in nineteenth-century Australia, while The Painting examines the migration experience through an art-theft mystery.

Booth's seventh novel, Bellevue (2023), is set in the Blue Mountains in 1972 and was described by Region Canberra as combining social commentary with elements of a psychological thriller. Her eighth novel, Death at Booroomba (2025), was published under the name A L Booth by Ventura Press. The historical murder mystery is set in postwar rural Australia and explores war trauma, prejudice and parochialism.

== Selected honours and awards ==
- 2019 – Elected Fellow of the Econometric Society
- 2017 – Distinguished Fellow Award, Economic Society of Australia
- 2015 – Founding Fellow of the European Association of Labour Economists
- 2005 – Elected Fellow of the Academy of the Social Sciences in Australia
- 1999 – Appointed Fellow of the Royal Society of Arts

== Personal life ==
Booth is married and has two daughters.

== Select bibliography ==
=== Books ===
- Booth, Alison L. (1995). The Economics of the Trade Union. Cambridge University Press. ISBN 978-0-521-46839-8.
- Booth, Alison L.; Snower, Dennis J. (1996). Acquiring Skills: Market Failures, Their Symptoms, and Policy Responses. Cambridge University Press. ISBN 978-0-521-47957-8.
- Booth, Alison L. (2026). Uneven Rewards: Milestones in Labour Economics. Australian National University Press. ISBN 978-1-76046-729-6.

=== Articles ===
- Booth, Alison L. (1985). "The Free Rider Problem and a Social Custom Model of Trade Union Membership". Quarterly Journal of Economics. 100 (1): 253–261. doi:10.2307/1885744. JSTOR 1885744.
- Arulampalam, Wiji; Booth, Alison L. (1998). "Training and Labour Market Flexibility: Is There a Trade-off?". British Journal of Industrial Relations. 36 (4): 521–536. doi:10.1111/1467-8543.00106.
- Booth, Alison L.; Francesconi, Marco; Frank, Jeff (2002). "Temporary Jobs: Stepping Stones or Dead Ends" (PDF). The Economic Journal. 112 (480): F189–F213. doi:10.1111/1468-0297.00043. hdl:10419/21049. S2CID 56458493.
- Booth, Alison L.; Francesconi, Marco; Frank, Jeff (2003). "A Sticky Floors Model of Promotion, Pay, and Gender". European Economic Review. 47 (2): 295–322. doi:10.1016/s0014-2921(01)00197-0.
- Booth, Alison L.; Bryan, Mark L. (2004). "The Union Membership Wage-Premium Puzzle: Is There a Free Rider Problem?". Industrial and Labor Relations Review. 57 (3): 402–421. doi:10.1177/001979390405700305. hdl:1885/86265. S2CID 3242792.
- Arulampalam, Wiji; Booth, Alison L.; Bryan, Mark L. (2007). "Is There a Glass Ceiling Over Europe? Exploring the Gender Pay Gap across the Wage Distribution" (PDF). ILR Review. 60 (2): 163–186. doi:10.1177/001979390706000201. S2CID 8475268.
- Booth, Alison L.; Van Ours, Jan C. (2008). "Job Satisfaction and Family Happiness: The Part-Time Work Puzzle" (PDF). The Economic Journal. 118 (526): F77–F99. doi:10.1111/j.1468-0297.2007.02117.x. hdl:10419/91984. S2CID 17505859.
- Booth, Alison; Coles, Melvyn (2010). "Education, Matching, and the Allocative Value of Romance" (PDF). Journal of the European Economic Association. 8 (4): 755–775. doi:10.1111/j.1542-4774.2010.tb00539.x. hdl:20.500.11780/1149. S2CID 198591220.
- Booth, Alison L.; Leigh, Andrew; Varganova, Elenea (2011). "Does Ethnic Discrimination Vary Across Minority Groups? Evidence from a Field Experiment". Oxford Bulletin of Economics and Statistics. 74 (4): 547–573. doi:10.1111/j.1468-0084.2011.00664.x. S2CID 14100864.
- Booth, Alison L.; Nolen, Patrick (2012). "Choosing to Compete: How Different are Girls and Boys?". Journal of Economic Behavior and Organization. 81 (2): 542–555. doi:10.1016/j.jebo.2011.07.018. S2CID 5284701.
- Booth, Alison L.; Nolen, Patrick (2012). "Gender Differences in Risk Behaviour: Does Nurture Matter?". Economic Journal. 122 (668): F56–F78. doi:10.1111/j.1468-0297.2011.02480.x. S2CID 73518665.
- Booth, Alison L.; Cardona-Sosa, L.; Nolen, Patrick (2014). "Gender Differences in Risk Aversion: Do Single-sex Environments Affect Their Development?" (PDF). Journal of Economic Behavior and Organization. 99: 126–154. doi:10.1016/j.jebo.2013.12.017. hdl:10784/7519. S2CID 52885972.
- Booth, Alison; Fan, Elliott; Zhang, Dandan; Xin, Meng (2019). "Gender Differences in Willingness to Compete: The Role of Culture and Institutions". The Economic Journal, 129: 734–764, https://doi.org/10.1111/ecoj.12583

=== Novels ===
- Booth, Alison (2010). Stillwater Creek. Read How You Want. ISBN 978-1-86471-125-7.
- Booth, Alison (2011). The Indigo Sky. Read How You Want. ISBN 978-1-74274-290-8.
- Booth, Alison (2012). A Distant Land. Random House Australia. ISBN 978-1-86471-194-3.
- Booth, Alison (2018). A Perfect Marriage. RedDoorPublishing. ISBN 978-1-910453-49-0.
- Booth, Alison (2020). The Philosopher's Daughters. RedDoor Press. ISBN 9781913062149
- Booth, Alison (2021). The Painting. RedDoor Press. ISBN 978-1-913062-65-1
- Booth, Alison (2023). Bellevue. RedDoor Press. ISBN 978-1-9997701-7-4
- Booth, A L (2025). Death at Booroomba. Ventura Press. ISBN 978-1-7638320-0-8
