= Paola Sapienza =

Economist

Paola Sapienza is an American and Italian economist. She is the J.P. Conte Family Senior Fellow at Hoover Institution . She is also a research associate at the NBER and CEPR. Her fields of interest include financial economics, cultural economics, and political economy.

== Education and career ==
Sapienza received a bachelor's degree in economics from Bocconi University in Milan. In 1998 she earned a Ph.D. in Economics from Harvard University with the completion of her thesis, titled Three essays in Banking, under the supervision of Andrei Shleifer and Jeremy Stein. In the same year she joined the faculty of the Kellogg School of Management at Northwestern University. She has been named Hoover Senior Fellow in 2024.

== Research ==
Her main research focuses on the impact of cultural norms on economic decisions and outcomes. In early 2000, together with Luigi Guiso and Luigi Zingales she was among the first economists exploring cultural economics in her work on social capital and financial development and in her work on religion and economic attitudes. In her most influential work, she examines the interactions between trust, social capital, and civic capital. She applied these concepts to financial development, financial institutions, behavioral economics and political economy. Her research is influential in finance where, with Luigi Guiso and Luigi Zingales, she draws the connection between trust and finance. Her most cited paper, with Luigi Guiso and Luigi Zingales, explores the role of culture in economics opening new perspectives for cultural economics. In her paper "Culture, Math, and Gender" she shows that girls' academic achievements are linked to societal cultural norms, debunking the genetic explanation for different math scores between boys and girls. In subsequent research, she has shown that stereotypes about women abilities may affect hiring and promotion of women in STEM related fields. In the field of the political economy of finance, her paper on the role of government ownership in financial institutions suggests that state-owned banks serve as a mechanism to supply political patronage. In her most recent series of papers, she expanded on her earlier work "Culture, Math, and Gender" and explored whether vertical transmission of cultural attitudes may explain different educational attainments.

Her research on education has contributes to understanding how cultural transmission affects educational outcomes. In a series of papers with Paola Giuliano and various collaborators, she explores how vertical and horizontal cultural transmission of preferences shapes academic performance. This research stream connects to their earlier work on cultural economics. Their work with immigrant students in Florida public schools demonstrates how cultural attitudes (specifically long term orientation) transmitted from parents to children influences educational achievement, showing that students from cultures emphasizing delayed gratification perform better academically. Their subsequent work on immigrant peer effects reveals that exposure to immigrant students positively impacts US-born students' academic performance, especially benefiting Black and low socioeconomic status students. These findings contribute to the broader understanding of how cultural values and beliefs transmitted through families and peer groups shape educational outcomes, challenging previous negative assumptions about immigrant effects on native students' performance.

Her paper "Trusting the Stock Market" has been awarded the Distinguished Paper Smith Breeden Prize at the American Financial Association's annual meeting in January 2010. Her work have been cited more than 33000 times. She has published papers in the American Economic Review, the Quarterly Journal of Economics, Science, the Journal of Finance, the Review of Financial Studies, the Journal of Financial Economics. Her research has been quoted in the Financial Times, Washington Post, Quartz, NPR, Forbes, The Economist, Science magazine, El País, The Telegraph, The New York Times, Bloomberg, The Wall Street Journal.

== Other activities ==
- Gruppo TIM, Non-Executive Independent Member of the Board of Directors, Lead Independent Director
- Assicurazioni Generali, Independent Member of the Board of Directors (2010–2019)

== Awards and recognition ==
She was an Associate Editor at the Journal of Finance from 2012 to 2015, an Associate Editor at Management of Science from 2009 to 2013 and an Associate Editor at the Journal of Economic Perspectives from 2005 to 2008. She was elected on the board of directors of the American Finance Association from 2012 to 2014. She is among the top 5% most quoted economist in the world and among the top 20 most influential female economists. She was included in the Thomson Reuters List of Most Influential Minds in 2014, 2015 and Clarivate list of Highly Cited Researchers in 2016, and 2018.
