= High-trust and low-trust societies =

Sociology concept

A low-trust society is defined as one in which interpersonal trust is relatively low, and shared ethical values are lacking. Conversely, a high-trust society is one where interpersonal trust is relatively high, and where ethical values are strongly shared.

== Institutions and mechanisms ==
According to researchers, low-trust societies are typically kinship-based; outcomes of low-trust societies can include difficulty in forming and maintaining corporate structures. Mechanisms and institutions that are corrupted, dysfunctional, or absent in low-trust societies include respect for private property rights, a trusted civil court system, democratic voting and acceptance of electoral outcomes, and voluntary tax payment.

Research has identified a correlation between linear-active cultures (i.e. following a daily schedule with a single task at a time) with high-trust societies, and multi-active cultures (flexible schedules with many tasks at once, often in an unplanned order) with low-trust cultures.

== Self-governance ==
High-trust societies display a high degree of mutual trust not imposed by outside "contractual, legal or hierarchical regulation", but instead are based upon "prior moral consensus". Much writing on the subject refers to Francis Fukuyama's 1995 book, Trust: Social Virtues and Creation of Prosperity, in which he describes "the ability of various peoples to organize effectively for commercial purposes without relying on blood ties or government intervention".

== See also ==
- Crime statistics
- Immigration and crime
- Paradox of tolerance
