= Family separation =

Involuntary separation of families

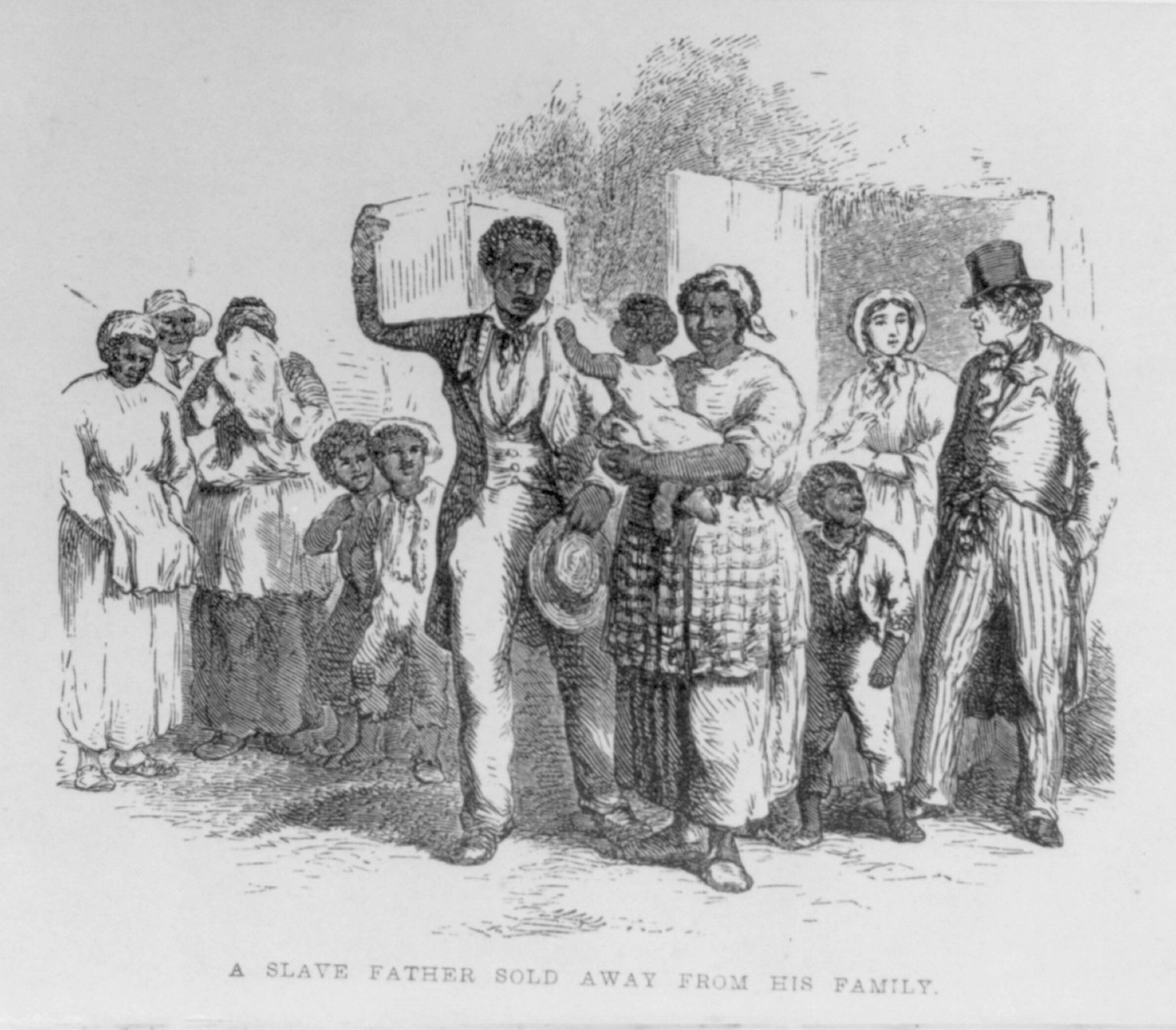
An American enslaved family being separated at a slave auction

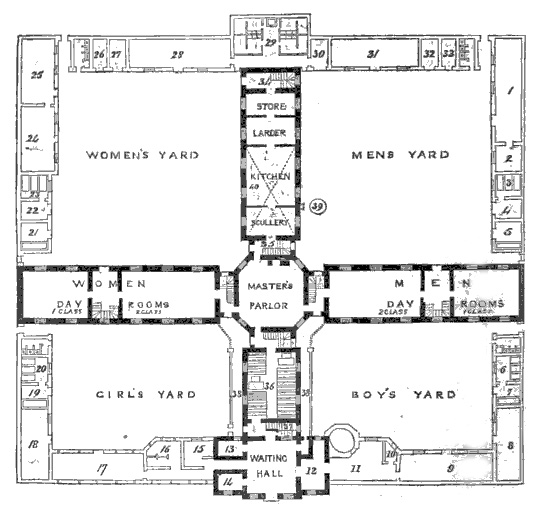
Workhouses/poorhouses in Great Britain and Ireland made family separation a condition of entry; note the separate quarters and yards for men, women, girls and boys; by entering a workhouse, "paupers" were considered to have forfeited responsibility for their families, and the authorities were also keen to prevent the poor from producing more children.

Family separation is the condition where family members are involuntarily separated from each other, often because of immigration systems, although it can happen for other reasons such as military service or involuntary adoption. Family separation can have a serious impact on mental health. Because family separation interferes with the right to family life, family reunification is a reason for immigration in many countries.

== See also ==
- Chain migration
- Child displacement
- Obstructionism
- Right of return
- Stolen Generations
- American Indian boarding schools
- Trump administration family separation policy
- Family separation in American slavery
