= Nancy Qian =

Chinese American economist

Nancy Qian (born in Shanghai, China) is a Chinese American economist and currently serves as the James J. O'Connor Professor of economics at the Kellogg School of Management MEDS and a Professor by Courtesy at the Department of Economics at Northwestern University. Her research interests include development economics, political economy and economic history. She is a Fellow of the Econometrics Society, a leading expert on long-run development and the Chinese economy. She the President of the Association for Comparative Economic Studies.

== Early life and education ==
Born in Shanghai, Nancy Qian was educated in the United States, earning a B.A. at the University of Texas at Austin in 2001 and a Ph.D. in economics at Massachusetts Institute of Technology in 2005, where she was advised by the future Nobel Laureates Esther Duflo, Abhijit Banerjee and Joshua Angrist. She was a Harvard Academy post-doctoral fellow at the Weatherhead Center for International Affairs, where she was mentored by future Nobel Laureates, James A. Robinson and Claudia Goldin.

== Career ==
After her graduation, she first worked as an assistant professor at Brown University (2005–09) and then at Yale University (2009–13), where she was promoted to associate professor (2013–16). Since 2017 she has been the James J. O'Connor Professor of Managerial Economics and Decision Sciences at the Kellogg School of Management. In parallel, Qian has held visiting appointments at EIEF, Fudan University, New York University, Princeton University, Harvard University and the Booth School of Business. She is affiliated with NBER, BREAD, CEPR, ASSA and the Econometric Society. Finally, in terms of professional service, she is currently serving on the editorial boards of the Journal of Development Economics, Economica, Journal of the European Economic Association, American Economic Journal: Applied Economics, and the Review of International Organizations.

== Research ==
Qian's research uses rigorous empirical analysis to address big-picture questions in development economics, political economy, and economic history. A common theme in her research is to use institutional details, policy shocks, large demographic and historical data to understand the detailed processes of long-run economic, cultural and institutional development. Her research has been influenced by the works of Amartya Sen. In her most well-known paper - Missing Women and the Price of Tea in China - Qian uses the impact of China's economic opening to estimate the effects of parents' relative contributions to a household's income on the difference between boys' and girls' survival rates, which stands at the core of the phenomenon of "missing women" in China. In particular, she finds that China's post-1978 economic opening caused the price for tea in China to increase as a consequence of greatly increased external demand, which in turn tended to increase the income of women in tea-producing regions; this, in turn, had a substantial positive impact on survival rates for girls and educational attainment for all children.

She (together with Xin Meng and Pierre Yared) also documents that the centrally planned grain procurement policy contributed to around half of the mortality during China's Great Famine. One of her works, falling under development economics, focuses on the how family size affects a child's educational attainment, a relevant question in the field of labor economics. Her extensive research in China led her to conclude that an increase in family size has a negative effect on child educational attainment, an issue that is specifically prevalent in developing countries. In another study, she and her co-authors show that anti-ethnic Ukrainian bias was a major contributor to high famine mortality during the Great Soviet Famine of 1932–33.

Another influential study shows that U.S. food aid is largely driven by U.S. objectives and can lead to more conflict in recipient countries. A well-cited finding using historical data (together with Nathan Nunn) is that the introduction of the potato within the Columbian exchange may have been responsible for at least a quarter of the population and urbanisation growth observed in the Old World between 1700 and 1900. A paper with Nathan Nunn and Sandra Sequeira shows that historical immigration to the United States increased productivity and innovation. Another paper shows that workers in low-income countries accumulate fewer skills on the job than workers in rich countries and this contributes to cross-country income differences.

Additionally, Qian has done extensive research on the Chinese economy. Qian has consulted for the World Bank, the Global Development Network and the China Development Bank. She is the co-director of the Global Poverty Research Lab, the founder of China Econ Lab, and co-organizer of the China NBER Workshop and an expert for VOX China. Her findings have been published in top academic journals such as the American Economic Review, the Journal of Political Economy and the Review of Economic Studies, and featured in media outlets such as the New York Times, NPR and the Wall Street Journal.

As of October 2021, Qian belongs to the top 2% of economists ranked on IDEAS/RePEc.

== Personal ==
She is married to economist, Mikhail Golosov, of the University of Chicago.

== Awards ==
- Russell Sage Foundation Award (with Nathan Nunn and Sandra Sequeira) (2014)
- Kiel Institute Excellence Award in Global Economic Affairs (2013)
- Fellow of the Econometrics Society (2023-)
- Alfred P. Sloan Fellowship (2012–15)
- National Science Foundation Grant (2009–11)
- Harvard University Academy Scholar (2007–2009)
- National Science Foundation Graduate Fellowship (2000–03)
