= Wiji Arulampalam =

British economist

Sowmya Wijayambal Arulampalam, known as Wiji Arulampalam, is an economist and professor at the department of economics in the University of Warwick. Arulampalam is the 152nd most cited female economist in the world according to the RePEc/IDEAS ranking.

Arulampalam holds a BA and MA in Mathematical Economics and Econometrics from the London School of Economics where she also obtained her PhD. She is on the editorial board of the journal Foundations and Trends in Econometrics. Arulampalam is a research fellow at the Institute for the Study of Labor (IZA) in Bonn, Germany. From 1991 to 1994, she was a fellow of the Royal Statistical Society and is currently a board member of the European Association of Labour Economists.

== Research and publications ==
Her research focuses on econometrics, development, education economics, health economics, labour economics and public economics. Arulampalam's work has been cited over 8500 times. Her most cited paper is on the glass ceiling in Europe. She published research not only in econometrics journals such as the Journal of Econometrics but also in medical journals such as the British Medical Journal.

Her research has been cited in The New York Times, Forbes, The Guardian, The Observer, The Daily Mirror and the Investors Chronicle.

=== Selected publications ===
- Arulampalam, Wiji; Booth, Alison L.; Bryan, Mark L. (January 2007). "Is There a Glass Ceiling over Europe? Exploring the Gender Pay Gap across the Wage Distribution". ILR Review. 60 (2): 163–186.
- Arulampalam, Wiji; Corradi, Valentina; Gutknecht, Daniel (2017-10-01). "Modeling heaped duration data: An application to neonatal mortality". Journal of Econometrics. Measurement Error Models. 200 (2): 363–377.
- Watson, S. I.; Arulampalam, W.; Petrou, S.; Marlow, N.; Morgan, A. S.; Draper, E. S.; Santhakumaran, S.; Modi, N.; Group, On behalf of the Neonatal Data Analysis Unit and the NESCOP (2014-07-01). "The effects of designation and volume of neonatal care on mortality and morbidity outcomes of very preterm infants in England: retrospective population-based cohort study". BMJ Open. 4 (7): e004856.
