= IZA World of Labor =

- Discipline: Labour economics
- Language: English
- Edited by: Daniel S. Hamermesh

Publication details
- History: 2014–present

Standard abbreviations
- ISO 4: IZA World Labor

Links
- Journal homepage

IZA World of Labor is an open access resource providing evidence-based research. It is run by the Institute for the Study of Labor (IZA) in partnership with Bloomsbury Publishing.

== Overview ==
IZA World of Labor launched on 1 May 2014 at the Press Club in Washington D.C. to coincide with International Workers' Day. It is a freely-available online resource presenting analyses of labor economics issues to inform evidence-based policy, from the effect of minimum wages on employment prospects to whether demographic bulges affect youth unemployment. Each peer-reviewed article is structured in a uniform format: pros and cons to demonstrate an objective view of current debates; a map showing where in the world the research has come from; data sources; and a one-page compact summary which offers quick, key facts.

The website and articles are divided into ten key areas of study: program evaluation; behavioral and personnel economics; migration; institutions; transition and emerging economies; development; environment; education and human capital; demography, family, and gender; and data and methods. The editor-in-chief is Daniel S. Hamermesh, Professor in Economics, Royal Holloway University of London and Sue Killam Professor Emeritus in the Foundation of Economics at the University of Texas at Austin.

== Subject areas ==
Articles published in IZA World of Labor cover the following subject areas:
Subject area	Subject editor
Education and human capital	Jo Blanden, University of Surrey, UK
Labor markets and institutions	Pierre Cahuc, Ecole Polytechnique, France
Program evaluation	Marco Caliendo, Potsdam University, Germany
Data and methods	Arnaud Chevalier, Royal Holloway, University of London, UK
Environment	Olivier Deschenes, University of California, Santa Barbara, USA
Behavioral and personnel economics	Jed DeVaro, California State University East Bay, USA
Migration and ethnicity	Ana Ferrer, University of Waterloo, Canada
Development	T. H. Gindling, University of Maryland Baltimore County, USA
Country labor markets	Daniel S. Hamermesh, Royal Holloway, University of London, UK, and University of Texas at Austin, USA
Transition and emerging economies	Artjoms Ivlevs, University of the West of England, UK
Demography, family and gender	Konstantinos Tatsiramos, University of Luxembourg and LISER, Luxembourg

== Abstracting and indexing ==
Articles are indexed in EconLit and RepEc.

== Partnerships and events ==
IZA World of Labor has collaborated with the World Bank, OECD, London School of Economics, and CEMFI to organise policy workshops.

== Press and media ==
Articles have received international coverage, with features in UK outlets such as the Daily Telegraph, The Independent, and Metro; German newspapers such as Die Welt; and South American press such as Peru 21, JC Magazine, and El Correo.
