= Cultural economics =

Branch of economics

Cultural economics is the branch of economics that studies the relation of culture to economic outcomes. Here, 'culture' is defined by shared beliefs and preferences of respective groups. Programmatic issues include whether and how much culture matters as to economic outcomes and what its relation is to institutions such as laws, rules, social conventions, norms, and so on. As a growing field in behavioral economics, the role of culture in economic behavior is increasingly being demonstrated to cause significant differentials in decision-making and the management and valuation of assets.

Applications include the study of religion, social capital, social norms, social identity, fertility, beliefs in redistributive justice, ideology, hatred, terrorism, trust, family ties, long-term orientation, and the culture of economics. A general analytical theme is how ideas and behaviors are spread among individuals through the formation of social capital, social networks and processes such as social learning, as in the theory of social evolution and information cascades. Methods include case studies and theoretical and empirical modeling of cultural transmission within and across social groups. In 2013, Said E. Dawlabani added the value systems approach to the cultural emergence aspect of macroeconomics.

== Development ==
Cultural economics develops from how wants and tastes are formed in society. This is partly due to nurture aspects, or what type of environment one is raised in, as it is the internalization of one's upbringing that shapes their future wants and tastes. Acquired tastes can be thought of as an example of this, as they demonstrate how preferences can be shaped socially.

A key thought area that separates the development of cultural economics from traditional economics is a difference in how individuals arrive at their decisions. While a traditional economist will view decision making as having both implicit and explicit consequences, a cultural economist would argue that an individual will not only arrive at their decision based on these implicit and explicit decisions but based on trajectories. These trajectories consist of regularities, which have been built up throughout the years and guide individuals in their decision-making process.

=== Combining value systems and systems thinking ===
Economists have also started to look at cultural economics with a systems thinking approach. In this approach, the economy and culture are each viewed as a single system where "interaction and feedback effects were acknowledged, and where in particular the dynamic were made explicit". In this sense, the interdependencies of culture and the economy can be combined and better understood by following this approach.

Said E. Dawlabani's book MEMEnomics: The Next-Generation Economic System combines the ideas of value systems (see value (ethics)) and systems thinking to provide one of the first frameworks that explores the effect of economic policies on culture. The book explores the intersections of multiple disciplines such as cultural development, organizational behavior, and memetics all in an attempt to explore the roots of cultural economics.

== Growth ==
The advancing pace of new technology is transforming how the public consumes and shares culture. The cultural economic field has seen great growth with the advent of online social networking which has created productivity improvements in how culture is consumed. New technologies have also led to cultural convergence where all kinds of culture can be accessed on a single device. Throughout their upbringing, younger persons of the current generation are consuming culture faster than their parents ever did, and through new mediums. The smartphone is a blossoming example of this where books, music, talk, artwork and more can all be accessed on a single device in a matter of seconds. This medium and the culture surrounding it is beginning to have an effect on the economy, whether it be increasing communication while lowering costs, lowering the barriers of entry to the technology economy, or making use of excess capacity.

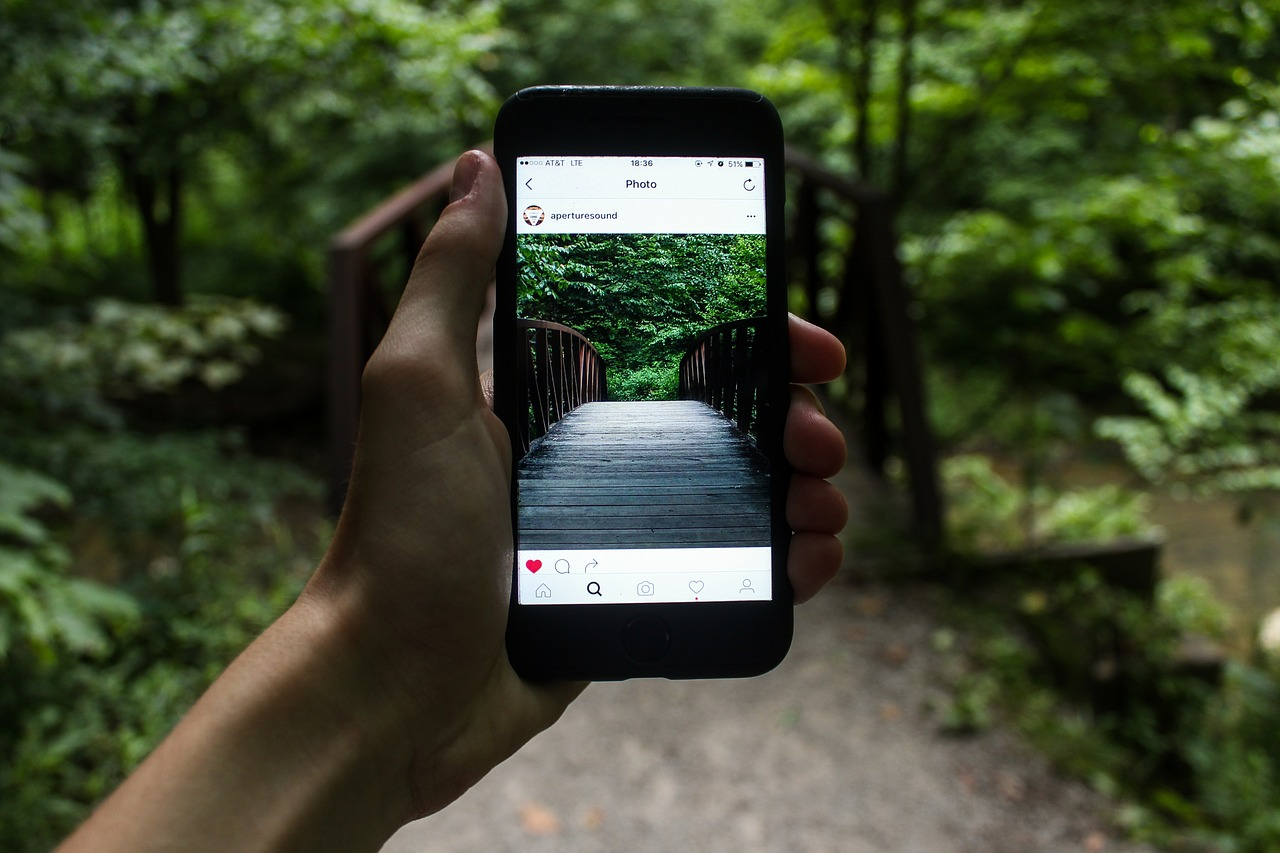
An example of culture being consumed via smartphone.

This field has also seen growth through the advent of new economic studies that have put on a cultural lens.

For example, Kafka and Kostis (2021) at a recent study published in the Journal of Comparative Economics, use an unbalanced panel dataset comprised from 34 OECD countries from 1981 to 2019, conclude that the cultural background during the overall period under consideration is characterized as post-materialistic and harms economic growth. Moreover, they highlight both theoretically and empirically the cultural backlash hypothesis since the cultural background of the countries under analysis presents a shift from traditional/materialistic (from 1981 up to 1998) to post-materialist values (from 1999 up to 2019). Doing so, they conclude on a positive effect of cultural background on economic growth when traditional / materialistic values prevail, and a negative effect when post-materialistic values prevail. These results highlight culture as a crucial factor for economic growth and indicate that economic policy makers should take it seriously into account before designing economic policy and in order to explain the effectiveness of economic policies implemented.

Another study on Europeans living with their families into adulthood was conducted by Paola Giuliano, a professor at UCLA. The study found that those of Southern European descent tend to live at home with their families longer than those of Northern European descent. Giuliano added cultural critique to her analysis of the research, revealing that it is Southern European culture to stay at home longer and then related this to how those who live at home longer have fewer children and start families later, thus contributing to Europe's falling birthrates. Giuliano's work is an example of how the growth of cultural economics is beginning to spread across the field.

== Sustainable development ==
An area that cultural economics has a strong presence in is sustainable development. Sustainable development has been defined as "...development that meets the needs of the present without compromising the ability of future generations to meet their own needs...". Culture plays an important role in this as it can determine how people view preparing for these future generations. Delayed gratification is a cultural economic issue that developed countries are currently dealing with. Economists argue that to ensure that the future is better than today, certain measures must be taken such as collecting taxes or "going green" to protect the environment. Policies such as these are hard for today's politicians to promote who want to win the vote of today's voters who are concerned with the present and not the future. People want to see the benefits now, not in the future.

Economist David Throsby has proposed the idea of culturally sustainable development which compasses both the cultural industries (such as the arts) and culture (in the societal sense). He has created a set of criteria in regards to for which policy prescriptions can be compared to in order to ensure growth for future generations. The criteria are as follows:

1. Advancement of material and non-material well-being: implies balance amongst economic, social, and cultural forces
2. Intergenerational equity and the maintenance of cultural capital: current generation must recognize their responsibility to future generations
3. Equity within the present generation: distribution of cultural resources must be fair
4. Recognition of interdependence: policy must understand the connections between economic, cultural and other variables within an overall system.

With these guidelines, Throsby hopes to spur the recognition between culture and economics, which is something he believes has been lacking from popular economic discussions.

== Cultural finance ==
Cultural finance a growing field in behavioral economics that studies the impact of cultural differences on individual financial decisions and on financial markets. Probably the first paper in this area was "The Role of Social Capital in Financial Development" by Luigi Guiso, Paola Sapienza, and Luigi Zingales. The paper studied how well-known differences in social capital affected the use and availability of financial contracts across different parts of Italy. In areas of the country with high levels of social capital, households invest less in cash and more in stock, use more checks, have higher access to institutional credit, and make less use of informal credit. Few years later, the same authors published another paper "Trusting the Stock Market" where they show that a general lack of trust can limit stock market participation. Since trust has a strong cultural component, these two papers represent important contribution in cultural economics.

In 2007, Thorsten Hens and Mei Wang pointed out that indeed many areas of finance are influenced by cultural differences. The role of culture in financial behavior is also increasingly being demonstrated to have highly significant effects on the management and valuation of assets. Using the dimensions of culture identified by Shalom Schwartz, it has been proved that corporate dividend payments are determined largely by the dimensions of Mastery and Conservatism. Specifically, higher degrees of conservatism are associated with greater volumes and values of dividend payments, and higher degrees of mastery are associated with the total opposite. The effect of culture on dividend payouts has been further shown to be closely related to cultural differences in risk and time preferences.

A different study assessed the role of culture on earnings management using Geert Hofstede's cultural dimensions and the index of earnings management developed by Christian Leutz; which includes the use of accrual alteration to reduce volatility in reported earnings, the use of accrual alteration to reduce volatility in reported operating cash flows, use of accounting discretion to mitigate the reporting of small losses, and the use of accounting discretion when reporting operating earnings. It was found that Hofstede's dimension of Individualism was negatively correlated with earnings management, and that uncertainty avoidance was positively correlated. Behavioral economist Michael Taillard demonstrated that investment behaviors are caused primarily by behavioral factors, largely attributed to the influence of culture on the psychological frame of the investors in different nations, rather than rational ones by comparing the cultural dimensions used both by Geert Hofstede and Robert J. House (Project GLOBE), identifying strong and specific influences in risk aversion behavior resulting from the overlapping cultural dimensions between them that remained constant over a 20-year period.

In regards to investing, it has been confirmed by multiple studies that greater differences between the cultures of various nations reduces the amount of investment between those countries. It was proven that both cultural differences between nations as well as the amount of unfamiliarity investors have with a culture not their own greatly reduces their willingness to invest in those nations, and that these factors have a negative impact with future returns, resulting in a cost premium on the degree of foreignness of an investment. Despite this, equity markets continue to integrate as indicated by equity price comovements, of which the two largest contributing factors are the ratio of trade between nations and the ratio of GDP resulting from foreign direct investment. Even these factors are the result of behavioral sources, however. The UN World Investment Report (2013) shows that regional integration is occurring at a more rapid rate than distant foreign relations, confirming an earlier study concluding that nations closer to each other tend to be more integrated. Since increased cultural distance reduces the amount of foreign direct investment, this results in an accelerating curvilinear correlation between financial behavior and cultural distance.

Culture also influences which factors are useful when predicting stock valuations. In Jordan, it was found that 84% of variability in stock returns were accounted for by using money supply, interest rate term structure, industry productivity growth, and risk premium; but were not influenced at all by inflation rates or dividend yield. In Nigeria, both real GDP and Consumer Price Index were both useful predictive factors, but foreign exchange rate was not. In Zimbabwe, only money supply and oil prices were found to be useful predictors of stock market valuations. India identified exchange rate, wholesale price index, gold prices, and market index as being useful factors. A comprehensive global study out of Romania attempted to identify if any factors of stock market valuation were culturally universal, identifying interest rates, inflation, and industrial production, but found that exchange rate, currency exchange volume, and trade were all unique to Romania.

== Geographical origins of cultural traits ==
Geographical characteristics were linked recently to the emergence of cultural traits and differences in the intensity of these cultural traits across regions, countries and ethnic group. Geographical characteristics that were favorable for the usage of the plow in agriculture contributed to a gender gap in productivity, and to the emergence of gender roles in society. Agricultural characteristics that led to a higher return to agricultural investment generated a process of selection, adaptation, and learning, that increase the level of long-term orientation in society.

== See also ==
- Behavioral economics
- Critique of economics
- Economic theory of museums
- History of schools of economic thought on arts and culture
- Cultural anthropology
- Cultural cognition
- Cultural geography
- Cultural policy
- Economic anthropology
- Economic imperialism (economics)
- Economic sociology
- Economics of the arts and literature
- Evolutionary economics
- Information economics
- Memetics
- Organizational behavior
- Social economics
- Sustainable development

== Journals ==
- Economic Development and Cultural Change
- Journal of Cultural Economics. Description, scope and links to volume contents.
