= Daniel S. Hamermesh =

American economist

Daniel Hamermesh
- Born: October 20, 1943 (age 82)

Academic background
- Education: University of Chicago (B.A.) 1965; Yale University (Ph.D.) 1969
- Doctoral advisor: Mark W. Leiserson

Academic work
- Discipline: Labor economics
- Institutions: University of Texas at Austin (1993–2014); Barnard College (2017–2021)
- Website: Information at IDEAS / RePEc

Daniel Selim Hamermesh (born October 20, 1943) is a U.S. economist, and Sue Killam Professor in the Foundations of Economics Emeritus at the University of Texas at Austin, Research Associate at the National Bureau of Economic Research, and Research Fellow at the Institute for the Study of Labor (IZA). Previously professor of economics at Royal Holloway, University of London and Michigan State University. He was formerly a Distinguished Scholar at Barnard College.

== Education and background ==
Hamermesh received his bachelor's degree from the University of Chicago, and in 1969 he received his Ph.D. in economics from Yale University. He has taught at the University of Texas at Austin (1993–2014), Michigan State University (1973–1993) and Princeton University (1969–1973). He has held visiting professorships at University of Michigan and Harvard University, as well as in Europe, Asia and Australia.

Hamermesh is a Fellow of the Econometric Society and the Society of Labor Economists, and Past President of the Society of Labor Economists and of the Midwest Economics Association. In 2013 he received the biennial Mincer Award of the Society of Labor Economists for lifetime contributions to labor economics, the annual IZA Prize in Labor from the Institute for the Study of Labor, and in 2014 the biennial John R. Commons Award of the international economics honor society ΟΔΕ. He was Editor-in-Chief of IZA World of Labor.

Hamermesh has received numerous grants from the National Science Foundation, other federal agencies, and private foundations, and has served on many panels of the United States National Academy of Sciences. He was head of the Scientific Advisory Board of the German Institute for Economic Research (DIW) from 2003 to 2008 and was Director of Research in the United States Department of Labor (ASPER) in 1974–75. He has lectured at over 300 universities, in 49 states (missing Alaska) and the District of Columbia and in 37 foreign countries on 6 continents (missing Antarctica), and has co-authored with 80 economists, including in 17 foreign countries.

== Research and publications ==
Hamermesh has published over 100 refereed articles in the major journals of economics. His work Labor Demand was published in 1993 by Princeton University Press, the same press that published his Beauty Pays in 2011. His book Spending Time was published in 2019 by Oxford University Press. His work discusses time use, labor demand, discrimination, social programs, academic labor markets, and unusual applications of labor economics (to beauty, sleep and suicide). A number of his papers have offered advice to younger and other scholars on etiquette in the economics profession. In 2016 Worth published the fifth edition of his Economics Is Everywhere, a series of 400 vignettes designed to illustrate the ubiquity of economics in everyday life and how the simple tools in a microeconomics principles class can be used.

== Resignation over gun safety concerns ==
After the University of Texas allowed concealed firearms in classrooms, Hamermesh resigned due to safety concerns, saying that he believed the law has increased the chance of injury or death to him or others in the classroom from the impulsive action of a disgruntled student.
