= Labour Economics (journal) =

- Discipline: Labour economics
- Language: English
- Edited by: Arthur van Soest

Publication details
- History: 1993-present
- Publisher: Elsevier
- Frequency: Bimonthly
- Impact factor: 1.036 (2016)

Standard abbreviations
- ISO 4: Labour Econ.

Indexing
- CODEN: LECOE3
- ISSN: 0927-5371 (print); 1879-1034 (web)
- LCCN: sn94029032
- OCLC no.: 28773230

Links
- Journal homepage; Online access

Labour Economics is a bimonthly peer-reviewed academic journal covering labor economics. It was established in 1993 and is the official journal of the European Association of Labour Economists. It is published by Elsevier and the editor-in-chief is Arthur van Soest (Tilburg University).

According to the Journal Citation Reports, the journal has a 2016 impact factor of 1.036.

== Editors in Chief ==
- Alison Booth (1999–2004)
- Helena Skyt Nielsen (2014–2017)
- Arthur van Soest (2018–present)
