= Paola Giuliano =

Italian-born economist

- Born: Italy, 1972

Academic background
- Education: Bocconi University; University of California, Berkeley

Academic work
- Institutions: UCLA Anderson School of Management

Paola Giuliano (Italy ,1972) is an economist and currently the Chauncey J. Medberry Chair in Management at the University of California, Los Angeles.

Giuliano is a research affiliate at the Centre for Economic Policy Research, a research fellow at the Institute of Labour Economics (IZA) and a research associate at the NBER. In 2004, she won the Young Economic Award from the European Economic Association, which has also elected her fellow.

== Career and education ==
She obtained a B.A. and M.A. from Bocconi University and a Ph.D. in economics from the University of California, Berkeley in 2003. From 2003 to 2008, she was an economist at the International Monetary Fund. During her tenure at the IMF, she was also a visiting scholar at Harvard University from 2006 to 2008. In 2008, she joined the Anderson School of Management at UCLA where she stayed until now. In 2016-2017 she was a visiting associate professor at Harvard University.

== Research ==
Giuliano mainly researches Cultural Economics, Social Economics and Political Economy. Her works have been cited over 18,000 times and she is the 51st most influential woman in economics according to her citation count on IDEAS. She has published in The Quarterly Journal of Economics, The Review of Economics Studies and the Journal of the European Economic Association.

Her work on culture has been recognized in the profession and she was asked to write a review article on "Culture and Institutions" in the Journal of Economics Literature along with Alberto Alesina.

Her research has been featured in Washington Post, Financial Times, The Guardian, New York Times, The Economist, Corriere della Sera, Le Figaro, Forbes and CNBC.

== Selected bibliography ==
- Alesina, Alberto; Giuliano, Paola; Nunn, Nathan (2013). "On the Origins of Gender Roles: Women and the Plough". Quarterly Journal of Economics. 128 (2): 469–530
- Alesina, Alberto; Giuliano, Paola (2015). "Culture and Institutions". Journal of Economic Literature. 53 (4): 898–944.
- Giuliano, Paola (2007). "Living Arrangements in Western Europe: Does Cultural Origin Matter?". Journal of the European Economic Association. 5 (5): 927–952.
