= IZA Institute of Labor Economics =

German think tank

IZA - Institute of Labor Economics
- Forschungsinstitut zur Zukunft der Arbeit

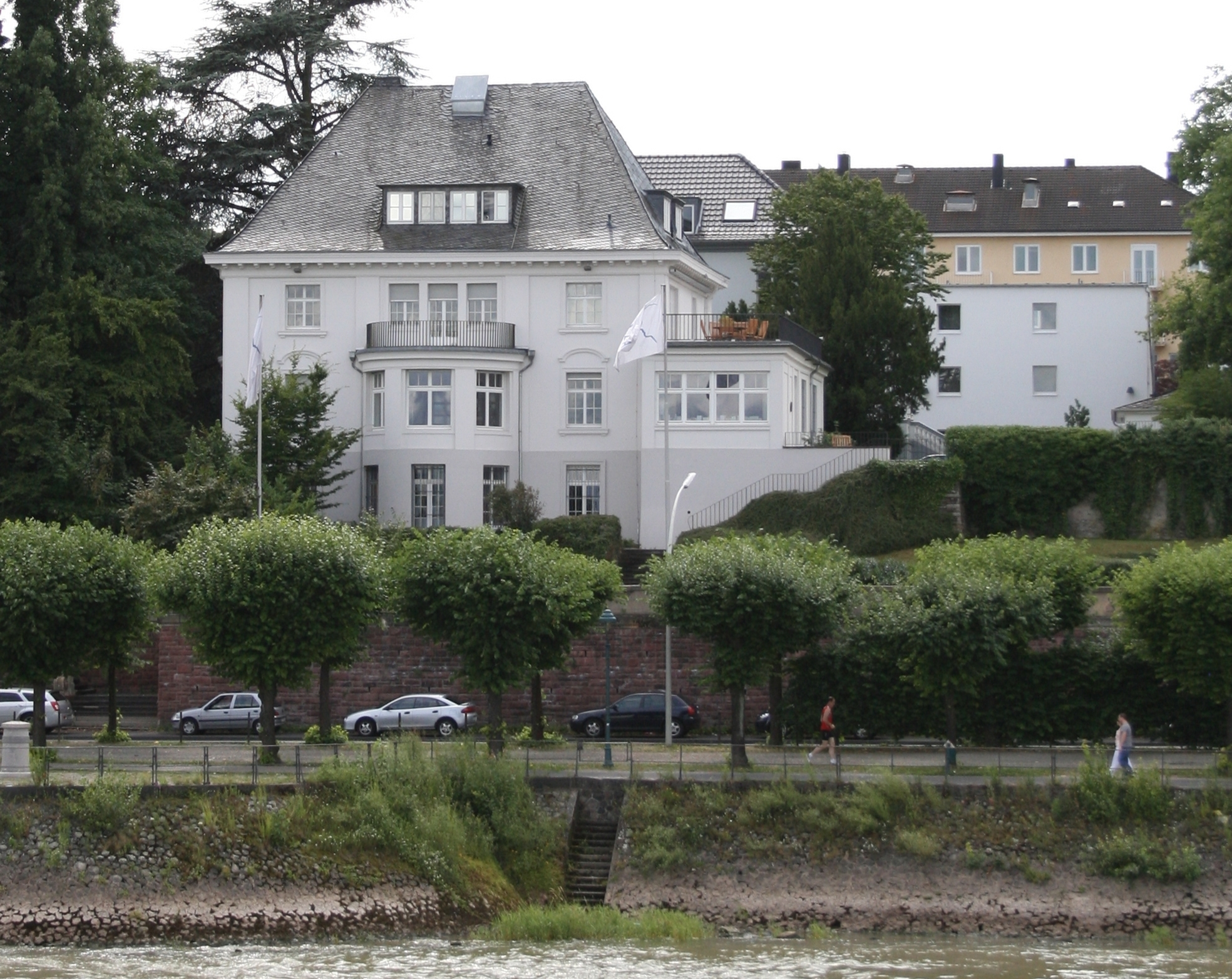
- Headquarters building, 2008
- Abbreviation: IZA
- Formation: 1998
- Dissolved: 2025
- Type: Economic research institute and think tank
- Legal status: non-profit limited liability company
- Location: Bonn, Germany
- President: Klaus Zumwinkel
- Director: None
- Website: www.iza.org

The IZA – Institute of Labor Economics (German: Forschungsinstitut zur Zukunft der Arbeit), was a private, independent economic research institute and academic network focused on the analysis of global labor markets and headquartered in Bonn. It existed between 1998 and 2025.

== History ==
Founded in 1998, IZA was a non-profit limited-liability organization supported by the Deutsche Post Foundation and other national and international sources. Until 2016, the organisation was formally called the Institute for the Study of Labor, commonly abbreviated as IZA.

=== Restructuring ===
On March 1, 2016, the Institute for the Study of Labor was restructured by Klaus Zumwinkel, CEO of the Deutsche Post Stiftung and president of IZA. A new institute on behavior and inequality research was founded while IZA will put more emphasis on policy-relevant research. Founding director Klaus F. Zimmermann, who did not accept these developments, left IZA on 1 March 2016. The number of staff was reduced from 60 to about 30.

=== Decline and closure ===
Following reorganization, IZA suffered from several years of internal turmoil and a leadership vacuum. In late 2023, behavioral economist Armin Falk withdrew from the leadership race following protests from hundreds of research fellows, despite being fully exonerated of previous misconduct allegations by an independent investigation at the University of Bonn. The previous CEO, Simon Jäger, resigned after less than two years in the role due to restructuring plans that raised concerns regarding the institute's financial viability.

In February 2025, the board of the Deutsche Post Foundation, led by Klaus Zumwinkel, decided to discontinue the operation of IZA as of 31 December 2025. Prominent economists, including Nobel laureate David Card, an IZA fellow, described the closure as a "very serious loss" for the field, particularly for junior scholars who relied on the IZA network for visibility and professional development.

== Work ==
IZA ran the world's largest research network in economic science, comprising over 1,300 international Research Fellows and Affiliates, as well as Policy Fellows from business, politics, society and the media.

By the mid-2010s RePEc ranked IZA as the second best labor economics research institution in the world as well as second of the top worldwide think tanks. In Germany it was the number one top economic institution.

In conducting labor market research, IZA cooperated closely with the Economics Department at the University of Bonn and the department's graduate education program at the Bonn Graduate School of Economics.

IZA's main focus is the economic analysis of national and international labor markets within a broad range of research areas. Furthermore, IZA provides policy advice on crucial labor market issues for national and international policy institutions.

=== Research ===
IZA's research activities concentrated on eleven program areas:

- Evaluation of Labor Market Programs
- Education
- Gender and Family
- Behavioral and Personnel Economics
- Labor Markets and Institutions
- Environment and Labor Markets
- Labor in the Macroeconomy
- Labor Statistics
- Mobility and Migration
- Labor in Emerging and Post-Transition Economies
- Employment and Development

To promote research on labor markets in developing countries, IZA launched in 2006, together with the World Bank, a joint research program on "Employment and Development". In addition, in its special research area "Growth and Labor Markets in Low Income Countries", IZA coordinates for the UK Department for International Development a substantial research program to promote growth and employment in low income countries.

=== Publications ===
IZA publishes the series Research in Labor Economics together with Emerald Group Publishing.

In addition, from 2012 to 2023 IZA published the IZA journal series, which consisted of originally five and later three open access journals that focus on different aspects of international labor markets. The journals were published on IZA's behalf by SpringerOpen (until 2017) and Sciendo (afterwards) and did not charge any author fees. After a 2017 reorganization, the following three journals were published:

- IZA Journal of Labor Economics
- IZA Journal of Labor Policy
- IZA Journal of Development and Migration (formerly IZA Journal of Migration)

The two original journals abolished in 2017 are:

- IZA Journal of Labor & Development
- IZA Journal of European Labor Studies

In 2023, IZA discontinued the IZA journal series altogether.

From 2014 to 2025, IZA published, together with Bloomsbury Publishing, IZA World of Labor, an open access resource providing empirically founded research articles on labor economics for a non-academic readership.

== Awards ==
=== IZA Prize in Labor Economics ===
From 2002 to 2020 IZA awarded the annual IZA Prize in Labor Economics for exceptional academic accomplishments in the field of labor economics. It was endowed with an award of 50,000 euros and ranked among the most prestigious economics awards worldwide.

=== Young Labor Economist Award ===
In 2006, IZA also established the "IZA Young Labor Economist Award" to honor an outstanding published paper in labor economics written by researchers under 40 years of age at the time of publication. The prize money of 5,000 Euros was shared between the authors. Winners of the price included include: Oriana Bandiera, Raj Chetty, Alexandre Mas and Martha Bailey.
