= Alf Vanags =

Latvian economist (1942-2016)

- Born: July 28, 1942; Riga
- Died: June 26, 2016 (aged 73); Riga

Academic background
- Education: London School of Economics

Academic work
- Discipline: Economic theory, International economics, Transport Economics
- Institutions: Queen Mary University of London, EuroFaculty, Stockholm School of Economics in Riga
- Website: Information at IDEAS / RePEc

Alf Vanags (Alfreds Helmuts Vanags) was a Latvian-British economist who played a critical role in restoring economic sciences in Latvia after the country regained its independence from the Soviet Union in 1991. In 2001, Vanags founded the Baltic International Centre for Economic Policy Studies (BICEPS), an independent economics think tank in Riga. Established in collaboration with the Stockholm Institute of Transition Economics, its purpose was to contribute to the renewal of the economics profession in the Baltic states and attract returning PhDs to the region. Vanags also served as the founding editor of the Baltic Journal of Economics, one of prime journals in economic sciences published in Northern Europe.

== Biography ==
Born in German-occupied Riga in 1942, Vanags grew up and received his education in London, where his parents settled after leaving Latvia as refugees in 1944. After graduating from the London School of Economics, he started his academic career at Queen Mary University of London and University of Wollongong in Australia.

After the collapse of the Soviet Union in 1991, Alf Vanags returned to Latvia to join the newly-formed EuroFaculty and the Stockholm School of Economics in Riga. Most of Vanags' own research of this period focused on financial stability, reform, and economic aspects of Latvian integration in the European Union. Additionally, he served as an editor for the journal "Maritime Economics & Logistics," published by Palgrave Macmillan.

As the modern economic science has been virtually non-existent in the Soviet planned economy, the return of Vanags has played a major role in jump-starting academic and policy analysis in Latvia after independence. In early 2000s, most professional economists in the country have been former students of Alf Vanags.

In addition to his academic and policy work, Vanags has frequently provided expert commentary on the Latvian economy in prominent media outlets world-wide.

Vjačeslavs Dombrovskis, the former Latvian Minister of Economics and Minister of Education and Science, described Alf Vanags as "the most competent and knowledgeable economist in Latvia". In 2006-2007, Vanags consistently warned of the impending economic crisis of 2008-2009 and criticized government macroeconomic decisions.

== Memorial Lecture Series ==
In 2017, an annual Alf Vanags Memorial Lecture was launched by BICEPS and the Baltic Economic Association in recognition of the contribution of Alf Vanags to development of economic science, education, and policy in Latvia.

Speakers have included Erik Berglöf, the Director of the LSE's Institute of Global Affairs, John Broome, the White's Professor of Moral Philosophy at the University of Oxford, Francis Kramarz, the Director of the Center for Research in Economics and Statistics in Paris, Ruben Enikolopov (Russian: Рубен Ениколопов), the rector of the New Economic School in Moscow, and Beata Javorcik, the chief economist of the European Bank for Reconstruction and Development.

== Main publications ==
- Vanags, Alf; Kalvet, Tarmo; Maniokas, Klaudijus (2012). "Financial engineering instruments: the way forward for cohesion policy support? Recent experience from the Baltic states". Baltic Journal of Economics. 12 (1): 5–22. doi:10.1080/1406099X.2012.10840508. S2CID 85507969.
- Vanags, Alf (2011). "Economic integration and cohesion in the Baltic Sea region: A critical perspective from the Baltic States". Journal of Baltic Studies. 42 (1): 91–102. doi:10.1080/01629778.2011.540805. S2CID 143230350.
- Vanags, Alf (2010). Tax reform in Latvia: Could it be fair? (PDF) (Technical report). SSE Riga/BICEPS Occasional Papers. Baltic International Centre for Economic Policy Studies (BICEPS) & Stockholm School of Economics in Riga (SSE Riga). No. 8.
- Vanags, Alf (2009). The Case for a Latvian Version of the Obama Broadband Package (PDF) (Technical report). SSE Riga/BICEPS Occasional Papers. Baltic International Centre for Economic Policy Studies (BICEPS) & Stockholm School of Economics in Riga (SSE Riga). No. 6.
- Vanags, Alfred; Hansen, Morten (October 2008). "Stagflation in Latvia: how long, how far, how deep?". Baltic Journal of Economics. 8 (1): 5–28. doi:10.1080/1406099X.2008.10840443. S2CID 153720901.
- Vanags, Alf; Morten Hansen (2006). Inflation in the Baltic States and Other EU New Member States: Similarities, Differences and Adoption of the Euro (PDF) (Technical report). SSE Riga/BICEPS Occasional Papers. Baltic International Centre for Economic Policy Studies (BICEPS) & Stockholm School of Economics in Riga (SSE Riga). No. 1.
- Vanags, Alf; Qin, Duo (1996). "Modelling the inflation process in transition economies: Empirical comparison of Poland, Hungary and Czech Republic". Economics of Planning. 29 (3): 147–168. doi:10.1007/BF00683946. S2CID 153538218.
- Vanags, Alfred; Hale, C. (September 1989). "Spot and Period Rates in the Dry Bulk Market: Some Tests for the Period 1980-1986". Journal of Transport Economics and Policy. 23 (3): 281–291. JSTOR 20052892.
- Vanags, Alfred; Katz, Eliakim (June 1978). "Money, Saving, and Portfolio Choice under Uncertainty". American Economic Review. 68 (3): 386–388. JSTOR 1805269.
