= Thomas Lemieux =

Canadian economist

- Born: August 10, 1962 (age 64)
- Education: Professor of Economics
- Alma mater: Université Laval Queen's University Princeton University
- Occupation: Lecturing
- Organization: University of British Columbia
- Spouse: Nicole Fortin

Thomas Lemieux (born August 10, 1962) is a Canadian economist and professor at the Vancouver School of Economics, University of British Columbia. He is the Director of the James M. and Cathleen D. Stone Centre on Wealth and Income Inequality at UBC.

Lemieux belongs to the world's foremost labour economists in terms of research output, in particular on wage inequality.

== Education ==
Lemieux was born in Quebec City, Quebec. He received his B.A. in economics from Université Laval in 1984 and his M.A. in economics from Queen's University the following year. In 1989, he received his Ph.D. from Princeton University.

== Later life and career ==
After receiving his Ph.D, he taught at the Massachusetts Institute of Technology until 1992. In 1992, he was named an assistant professor at the Université de Montréal. In 1999, Lemieux accepted a faculty position at the University of British Columbia. He has been an associate editor at several economics journals, such as the Journal of Business and Economic Statistics, Labour Economics, Journal of the European Economic Association, Review of Economics and Statistics, and American Economic Review.

A good portion of his research centres around the topic of income inequality. Lemieux also studies econometric methods to analyze the income distribution. He is a fellow at the Royal Society of Canada and the Society of Labor Economists. At the University of British Columbia, Lemieux directs the Team for Advanced Research on Globalization, Education, and Technology. Lemieux has published 40 journal articles and two books on labor economics.

== Research ==
Thomas Lemieux's research interests mostly relate to labour economics in general and wage inequality in specific as well as econometric methods to analyze these issues. According to IDEAS/RePEc, Lemieux belongs to the top 1% of most-cited economists. In his research, Lemieux has frequently collaborated with David Card and Nicole Fortin.

=== Research on wages and wage inequality ===
The main area of Lemieux's research has been the distribution and dynamics of wages. Studying the rise in wage inequality in the U.S. in the 1980s in a series of studies with John DiNardo and Nicole Fortin, Lemieux repeatedly emphasizes the importance labour market institutions, finding e.g. that about a third of the growth in male and female wage inequality can be attributed to deunionization for men and to the minimum wage for women, with economic deregulation having a comparatively small impact; moreover, the difference between the declines of the unionization rates in Canada and the U.S. are found to account for two-thirds of the growth differential in wage inequality between both. Further work with David Card, Francis Kramarz, John Abowd and David Margolis studied differences between the labour market institutions in the U.S., Canada and France in the 1980s, notably the causes of changes in the relative structure of wages and employment and the effect of the minimum wage on youth employment. Moreover, in studies with Card and Fortin, Lemieux analysed the differentials between genders and racial groups in the U.S., with their findings emphasizing the role of changes in returns to skill and the link between female wage gains and male wage inequality. In further work on unions, Lemieux argues that Canadian unions increase the average wage of workers and compress the returns to skills, and provides a comprehensive comparison of the effect of unionization on wage inequality in the U.S., Canada and UK (together with Card and W. Craig Riddell). In another study with Card, Lemieux suggested that falling supply in highly educated workers may account for the growth in the return to college for younger men in the U.S., UK and Canada. In the 2000s, Lemieux repeatedly highlighted the role of increased returns to postsecondary education and sophisticated institutional explanations (e.g. including performance pay, based on work with Bentley MacLeod and Daniel Parent) for the growth in wage inequality at the top of the wage distribution in the 1980s and 1990s, while arguing against simple models of skill-biased technological change This empirical discussion was accompanied by various models advanced by Lemieux, e.g. - in joint work with Robert Gibbons, Lawrence Katz and Parent - of a model where a worker's skills are imperfectly observable but determine her current wage and sector, high-skill workers concentrate in high-wage sectors, thus earning high returns to their skills (with Robert Gibbons, Lawrence Katz and Daniel Parent).

=== Research on regression discontinuity and decomposition methods ===
Lemieux has contributed significantly to the methodological development of applied econometrics. Since the 2000s, he has repeatedly used regression discontinuity designs to analyze various economic issues. For example, in work with David Card that exploits the discontinuity in college enrollment rates due to U.S. high school graduates' attempt of avoiding the draft during the Vietnam War, Lemieux estimates that draft avoidance raised college attendance rates by 4-6%. Similarly, in a study with Kevin Milligan that uses the discontinuity in Quebecois social assistance between childless recipients under and above age 30, Lemieux observes that the increase in social assistance benefits reduces employment by disincentivizing work. Publications with Guido Imbens and David S. Lee, Lemieux further reviewed the use of regression discontinuity designs in economics and provides guidance for practitioners. Another key area of Lemieux's work in econometrics are decomposition methods, in particular related to comparisons between wage distributions and the analysis of their dynamics. More recently, together with Sergio Firpo and Nicole Fortin, Lemieux has pioneered the use of recentered influence function (RIF) regressions, an extension of the Oaxaca-Blinder decomposition method which allows to study the impact of changes in the distribution of the explanatory variables on quantiles of the unconditional (marginal) distribution of an outcome variable. While Lemieux, Firpo and Fortin originally used RIF regressions to analyze the polarization of male wages in the U.S. from the 1980s to the mid-2010s, their methodology has been adopted by other organizations, e.g. the ILO's 2018/19 Global Wage Report. Another important application of RIFs by Lemieux, Firpo and Fortin is the analysis of the contributions of changes in the returns to occupational tasks to changes in the (U.S.) wage distribution, for which they find that wage polarization was driven by STBC and deunionization in the 1980s and 1990s, whereas offshorability of jobs became a major driver in the 1990s. A review by these authors of common decomposition methods used in economics was published in the Handbook of Labor Economics.

=== Other research ===
Other major research by Lemieux includes an analysis of the effects of foreign competition on Canadian collective bargaining agreements (with John Abowd), of the effects of taxes on informal labour supply (with Bernard Fortin and Pierre Frechette), on the evolution of work, school and living arrangements among North American youth in the 1970s-90s, on the substitution of alcohol by marijuana due to the increase in the minimum drinking age in several U.S. states, and on dropout and enrollment trends in the U.S. in the postwar period.

== Bibliography ==
Books

- Labour Market Economics, 7th Edition (with D. Benjamin, M. Gunderson, and W.C. Riddell), Toronto: McGraw-Hill Ryerson, 2012.
- Labour Market Economics, 6th Edition (with D. Benjamin, M. Gunderson, and W.C. Riddell), Toronto: McGraw-Hill Ryerson, 2007.
- Social and Labour Market Aspects of North American Linkages (co-editor with Richard Harris), University of Calgary Press for Industry Canada, 2005.
- L'économie souterraine au Québec: mythes et réalités (with Bernard Fortin, Gaétan Garneau, Guy Lacroix, and Claude Montmarquette), Québec: Presses de l'Université Laval, 1996
