= Hans-Dietrich Genscher =

German politician (1927–2016)

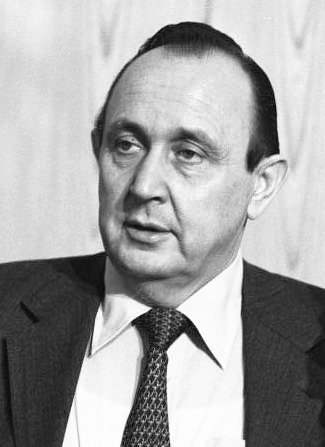
- Genscher in 1978

Vice Chancellor of Germany West Germany
- In office 1 October 1982 – 17 May 1992
- President: Karl Carstens; Richard von Weizsäcker
- Chancellor: Helmut Kohl
- Preceded by: Egon Franke
- Succeeded by: Jürgen Möllemann
- In office 17 May 1974 – 17 September 1982
- President: Gustav Heinemann; Walter Scheel; Karl Carstens
- Chancellor: Helmut Schmidt
- Preceded by: Walter Scheel
- Succeeded by: Egon Franke

Federal Minister for Foreign Affairs
- In office 1 October 1982 – 17 May 1992
- Chancellor: Helmut Kohl
- Preceded by: Helmut Schmidt
- Succeeded by: Klaus Kinkel
- In office 17 May 1974 – 17 September 1982
- Chancellor: Helmut Schmidt
- Preceded by: Walter Scheel
- Succeeded by: Helmut Schmidt

Leader of the Free Democratic Party
- In office 1 October 1974 – 23 February 1985
- Preceded by: Walter Scheel
- Succeeded by: Martin Bangemann

Federal Minister of the Interior
- In office 22 October 1969 – 16 May 1974
- Chancellor: Willy Brandt
- Preceded by: Ernst Benda
- Succeeded by: Werner Maihofer

Member of the Bundestag for North Rhine-Westphalia
- In office 19 September 1965 – 26 October 1998
- Constituency: FDP List

Personal details
- Born: 21 March 1927 Reideburg, Prussia, Germany
- Died: 31 March 2016 (aged 89) Wachtberg, Germany
- Party: Free Democratic Party of Germany (1952–2016)
- Other political affiliations: Liberal Democratic Party of Germany (GDR) (1946–1952)
- Spouses: Luise Schweitzer (m. 1958; div. 1966) Barbara Genscher (m. 1969)
- Education: Martin Luther University of Halle-Wittenberg; Leipzig University (Staatsexamen)
- Occupation: Politician
- Website: genscher.de

Hans-Dietrich Genscher (German: [ˈɡɛnʃɐ]; 21 March 1927 – 31 March 2016) was a German statesman and a member of the liberal Free Democratic Party (FDP), who served as Federal Minister of the Interior from 1969 to 1974, and as Federal Minister for Foreign Affairs and Vice Chancellor of Germany from 1974 to 1992 (except for a two-week break in 1982, after the FDP had left the Third Schmidt cabinet), making him the longest-serving occupant of either post and the only person to have held one of these positions under two different Chancellors of the Federal Republic of Germany. In 1991 he was chairman of the Organization for Security and Co-operation in Europe (OSCE).

A proponent of Realpolitik, Genscher has been called "a master of diplomacy". He is widely regarded as having been a principal "architect of German reunification". In 1991, he played a pivotal role in international diplomacy surrounding the breakup of Yugoslavia by successfully pushing for international recognition of Croatia, Slovenia and other republics declaring independence, in an effort to halt "a trend towards a Greater Serbia". After leaving office, he worked as a lawyer and international consultant. He was President of the German Council on Foreign Relations and was involved with several international organisations, and with former Czech President Václav Havel, he called for a Cold War museum to be built in Berlin.

== Biography ==
=== Early life ===
Genscher was born on 21 March 1927 in Reideburg (Province of Saxony Anhalt), now a part of Halle, in what later became East Germany. He was the son of Hilda Kreime and Kurt Genscher. His father, a lawyer, died when Genscher was nine years old. In 1943, he was drafted to serve as a member of the Air Force Support Personnel (Luftwaffenhelfer) at the age of 16. At age 17, close to the end of the war, he and his fellow soldiers became members of the Nazi Party due to a collective application (Sammelantrag) by his Wehrmacht unit. He later said he was unaware of it at the time.

Late in the war, Genscher was deployed as a soldier in General Walther Wenck's 12th Army, which ostensibly was directed to relieve the siege of Berlin. After the German surrender he was an American and British prisoner of war, but was released after two months. Following World War II, he studied law and economics at the universities of Halle and Leipzig (1946–1949) and joined the East German Liberal Democratic Party (LDPD) in 1946.

=== Political career ===
In 1952, Genscher fled to West Germany, where he joined the Free Democratic Party (FDP). He passed his second state examination in law in Hamburg in 1954 and became a solicitor in Bremen. During these early years after the war, Genscher continuously struggled with illness. From 1956 to 1959 he was a research assistant of the FDP parliamentary group in Bonn. From 1959 to 1965 he was the FDP group managing director, while from 1962 to 1964 he was National Secretary of the FDP.

In 1965 Genscher was elected on the North Rhine-Westphalian FDP list to the West German parliament and remained a member of parliament until his retirement in 1998. He was elected deputy national chairman in 1968. From 1969 he served as minister of the interior in the SPD-FDP coalition government led by Chancellor Willy Brandt.

In 1974 he became foreign minister and vice chancellor, both posts he would hold for 18 years. From 1 October 1974 to 23 February 1985 he was Chairman of the FDP. It was during his tenure as party chairman that the FDP switched from being the junior member of social-liberal coalition to being the junior member of the 1982 coalition with the CDU/CSU. In 1985 he gave up the post of national chairman. After his resignation as Foreign Minister, Genscher was appointed honorary chairman of the FDP in 1992.

== Federal Minister of the Interior ==
After the federal election of 1969 Genscher was instrumental in the formation of the social-liberal coalition of chancellor Willy Brandt and was on 22 October 1969 appointed as federal minister of the interior. In 1972, while minister for the interior, Genscher rejected Israel's offer to send an Israeli special forces unit to Germany to deal with the Munich Olympics hostage crisis. He offered himself as a hostage under the condition that the Israeli athletes would be released, but the leader of the terror group rejected that offer. A flawed rescue attempt by German police forces at Fürstenfeldbruck air base resulted in a bloody shootout, which left all eleven hostages, five terrorists, and one German policeman dead. Genscher then offered to resign as Minister of the Interior to chancellor Brandt, but Brandt rejected the offer. Genscher's popularity with Israel declined further when he endorsed the release of the three captured attackers following the hijacking of a Lufthansa aircraft on 29 October 1972.

In the SPD–FDP coalition, Genscher helped shape Brandt's policy of deescalation with the communist East, commonly known as Ostpolitik, which was continued under chancellor Helmut Schmidt after Brandt's resignation in 1974. He would later be a driving factor in continuing this policy in the new conservative-liberal coalition under Helmut Kohl.

== Vice Chancellor and Federal Foreign Minister ==
In the negotiations on a coalition government of SPD and FDP following the 1976 elections, it took Genscher 73 days to reach agreement with Chancellor Helmut Schmidt.

As Foreign Minister, Genscher stood for a policy of compromise between East and West, and developed strategies for an active policy of détente and the continuation of the East–West dialogue with the USSR. He was widely regarded a strong advocate of negotiated settlements to international problems. As a popular story on Genscher's preferred method of shuttle diplomacy has it, "two Lufthansa jets crossed over the Atlantic, and Genscher was on both".

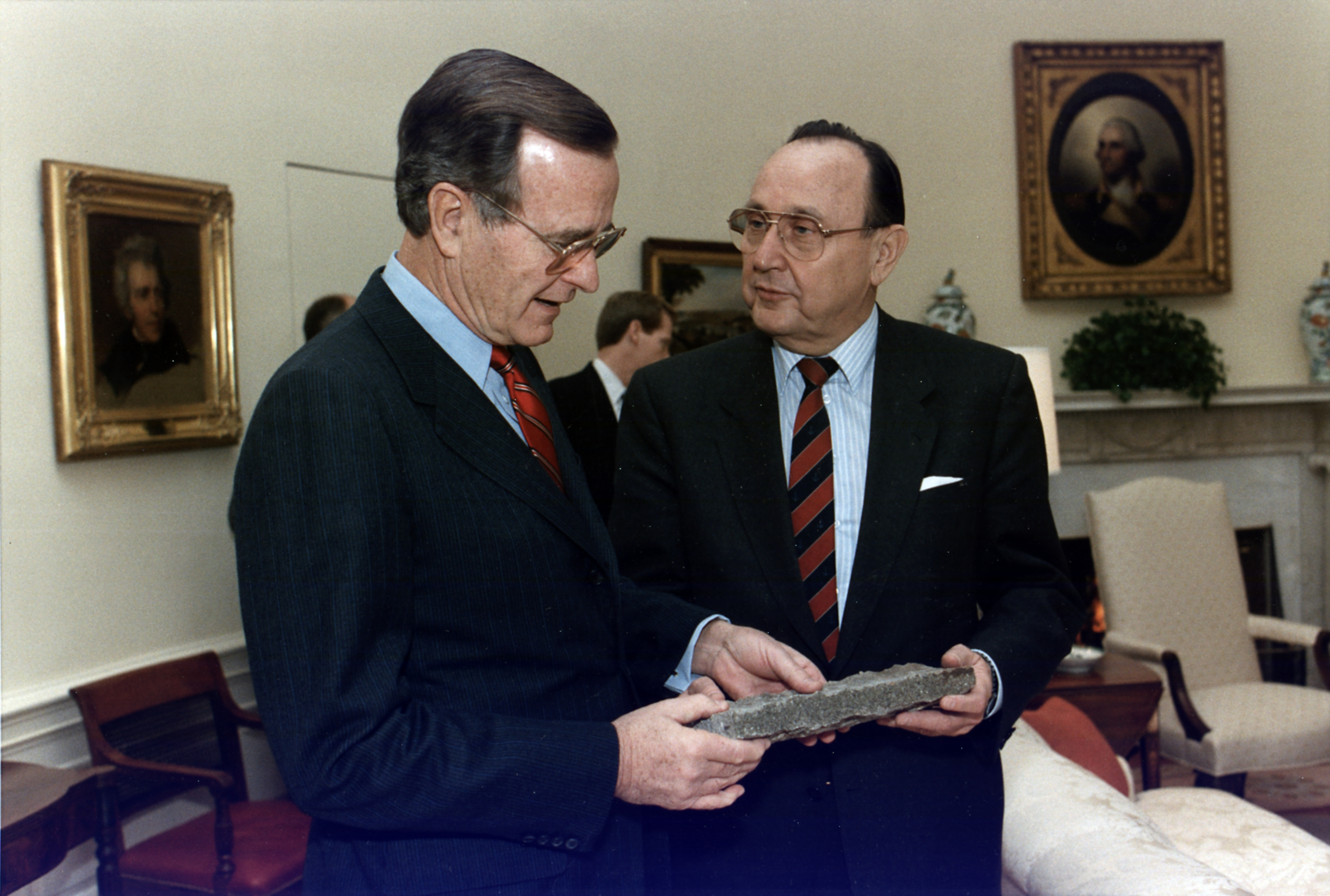
George H. W. Bush and Genscher (21 November 1989)

Genscher was a major player in the negotiations on the text of the Helsinki Accords. In December 1976, the General Assembly of the United Nations in New York City accepted Genscher's proposal of an anti-terrorism convention in New York, which was set among other things, to respond to demands from hostage-takers under any circumstances.

Genscher was one of the FDP's driving forces when, in 1982, the party switched sides from its coalition with the SPD to support the CDU/CSU in their Constructive vote of no confidence to have incumbent Helmut Schmidt replaced with opposition leader Helmut Kohl as Chancellor. The reason for this was the increase in the differences between the coalition partners, particularly in economic and social policy. The switch was controversial, not least in his own party.

At several points in his tenure, he irritated the governments of the United States and other allies of Germany by appearing not to support Western initiatives fully. "During the Cold War, his penchant to seek the middle ground at times exasperated United States policy-makers who wanted a more decisive, less equivocal Germany", according to Tyler Marshall. Genscher's perceived quasi-neutralism was dubbed Genscherism. "Fundamental to Genscherism was said to be the belief that Germany could play a role as a bridge between East and West without losing its status as a reliable NATO ally." In the 1980s, Genscher opposed the deployment of new short-range NATO missiles in Germany. At the time, the Reagan Administration questioned whether Germany was straying from the Western alliance and following a program of its own.

In 1984, Genscher became the first Western foreign minister to visit Tehran since the Iranian Revolution of 1979. In 1988, he appointed Jürgen Hellner as West Germany's new ambassador to Libya, a post that had been vacant since the 1986 Berlin discotheque bombing, a tragedy which U.S. officials blamed on the government of Muammar Gaddafi.

Genscher's proposals frequently set the tone and direction of foreign affairs among Western Europe's democracies. He was also an active participant in the further development of the European Union, taking an active part in the Single European Act Treaty negotiations in the mid-1980s, as well as the joint publication of the Genscher-Colombo plan with Italian Minister of Foreign Affairs Emilio Colombo which advocated further integration and deepening of relations in the European Union towards a more federal Europe. He later was among the politicians who pushed hard for monetary union alongside Edouard Balladur, France's finance minister, and Giuliano Amato, circulating a memorandum to that effect.

Genscher retained his posts as foreign minister and vice chancellor through German reunification and until 1992 when he stepped down for health reasons.

=== Reunification efforts ===
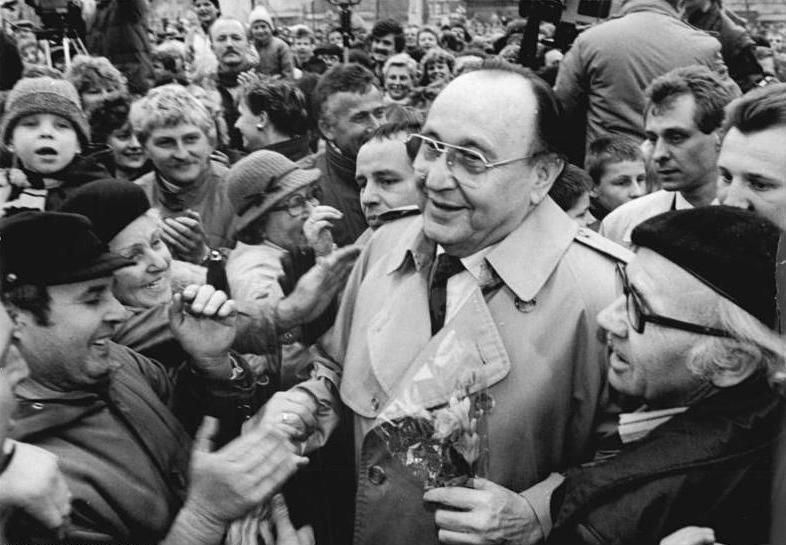
Genscher in the GDR, 1990

Genscher is most respected for his efforts that helped spell the end of the Cold War, in the late 1980s when Communist eastern European governments toppled, and which led to German reunification. During his time in office, he focused on maintaining stability and balance between the West and the Soviet bloc. From the beginning, he argued that the West should seek cooperation with Communist governments rather than treat them as implacably hostile; this policy was embraced by many Germans and other Europeans.

Genscher had great interest in European integration and the success of German reunification. He soon pushed for effective support of political reform processes in Poland and Hungary. For this purpose, he visited Poland to meet the chairman of Solidarity Lech Wałęsa as early as January 1980. Especially from 1987 he campaigned for an "active relaxation" policy response by the West to the Soviet efforts. In the years before German reunification, he made a point of maintaining strong ties with his birthplace Halle, which was regarded as significant by admirers and critics alike.

When thousands of East Germans sought refuge in West German embassies in Czechoslovakia and Poland, Genscher held discussions on the refugee crisis at the United Nations in New York with the foreign ministers of Czechoslovakia, Poland, East Germany and the Soviet Union in September 1989. Genscher's 30 September 1989 speech from the balcony of the German embassy in Prague was an important milestone on the road to the end of the GDR. In the embassy courtyard thousands of East German citizens had assembled. They were trying to travel to West Germany, but were being denied permission to travel by the Czechoslovak government at the request of East Germany. He announced that he had reached an agreement with the Communist Czechoslovak government that the refugees could leave: "We have come to you to tell you that today, your departure ..." (German: "Wir sind zu Ihnen gekommen, um Ihnen mitzuteilen, dass heute Ihre Ausreise ..."). After these words, the speech was drowned in cheers.

With his fellow foreign ministers James Baker of the United States and Eduard Shevardnadze of the Soviet Union, Genscher is widely credited with securing Germany's subsequent peaceful unification and the withdrawal of Soviet forces. He negotiated the German reunification in 1990 with his counterpart from the GDR, Markus Meckel. On 12 September 1990 he signed the Treaty on the Final Settlement with Respect to Germany on behalf of West Germany. In November 1990, Genscher and his Polish counterpart Krzysztof Skubiszewski signed the German-Polish Border Treaty on the establishment of the Oder–Neisse line as Poland's western border. Meanwhile, he strongly endorsed the plans of the Bush Administration to assure continued U.S. influence in a post-Cold War Europe.

=== Post-reunification ===
In 1991, Genscher successfully pushed for Germany's recognition of the Republic of Croatia in the Croatian War of Independence shortly after JNA entered Vukovar. After Croatia and Slovenia had declared independence, Genscher concluded that Yugoslavia could not be held together, and that republics that wanted to break from the Serbian-dominated federation deserved quick diplomatic recognition. He hoped that such recognition would stop the fighting. The rest of the European Union was subsequently pressured to follow suit soon afterward. The UN Secretary-General Javier Pérez de Cuéllar had warned the German Government that a recognition of Slovenia and Croatia would lead to an increase in aggression in the former Yugoslavia.

At a meeting of the European Community's foreign ministers in 1991, Genscher proposed to press for a war crimes trial for President Saddam Hussein of Iraq, accusing him of aggression against Kuwait, using chemical weapons against civilians and condoning genocide against the Kurds.

During the Gulf War, Genscher sought to deal with Iraq after other Western leaders had decided to go to war to force it out of Kuwait. Germany made a substantial financial contribution to the allied cause but, citing constitutional restrictions on the use of its armed forces, provided almost no military assistance. In January 1991, Germany sent Genscher on a state visit to Israel and followed up with an agreement to provide the Jewish state with $670 million in military aid, including financing for two submarines long coveted by Israel, a battery of Patriot missiles to defend against Iraqi missiles, 58 armored vehicles specially fitted to detect chemical and biological attacks, and a shipment of gas masks. When, in the aftermath of the war, a far-reaching political debate broke out over how Germany should fulfill its global responsibilities, Genscher responded that if foreign powers expect Germany to assume greater responsibility in the world, they should give it a chance to express its views "more strongly" in the United Nations Security Council. He also famously held that "whatever floats is fine, whatever rolls is not" to sum up Germany's military export policy for restless countries – based on a navy's unsuitability for use against a country's own people.

In 1992, Genscher, together with his Danish colleague Uffe Ellemann-Jensen, took the initiative to create the Council of the Baltic Sea States (CBSS) and the EuroFaculty.

More than half a century after Nazi leaders assembled their infamous exhibition "Degenerate Art", a sweeping condemnation of the work of the avant-garde, Genscher opened a re-creation of the show at the Altes Museum in March 1992, describing Nazi attempts to restrict artistic expression as "a step toward the catastrophe that produced the mass murder of European Jews and the war of extermination against Germany's neighbors." "The paintings in this exhibition have survived oppression and censorship", he asserted in his opening remarks. "They are not only a monument but also a sign of hope. They stand for the triumph of creative freedom over barbarism."

On 18 May 1992, Genscher retired at his own request from the federal government, which he had been member of for a total of 23 years. At the time, he was the world's longest-serving foreign minister and Germany's most popular politician. He had announced his decision three weeks earlier, on 27 April 1992. Genscher did not specify his reasons for quitting; however, he had suffered two heart attacks by that time. His resignation took effect in May, but he remained a member of parliament and continued to be influential in the Free Democratic Party.

Following Genscher's resignation, Chancellor Helmut Kohl and FDP chairman Otto Graf Lambsdorff named Irmgard Schwaetzer, a former aide to Genscher, to be the new Foreign Minister. In a surprise decision, however, a majority of the FDP parliamentary group rejected her nomination and voted instead to name Justice Minister Klaus Kinkel to head the Foreign Ministry.

== Activities after politics ==
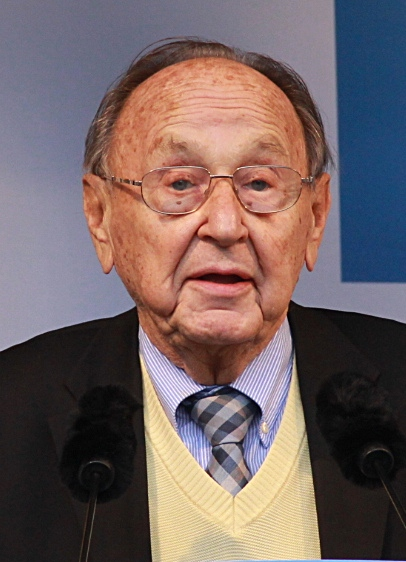
Genscher in 2013

Ahead of the German presidential election in 1994, Genscher proclaimed his lack of interest in the position, but was nonetheless widely considered a leading contender. After a poll taken for Stern magazine showed him to be the favored candidate of 48 percent of German voters, he reiterated in 1993 that he would "in no case" accept the presidency.

Having finished his political career, Genscher remained active as a lawyer and in international organizations. In late 1992, Genscher was appointed chairman of a newly established donors' board of the Berlin State Opera. Between 1997 and 2010, Genscher was affiliated with the law firm Büsing, Müffelmann & Theye. He founded his own consulting firm, Hans-Dietrich Genscher Consult GmbH, in 2000. Between 2001 and 2003, he served as president of the German Council on Foreign Relations. In 2001, Genscher headed an arbitration that ended a monthlong battle between German airline Lufthansa and its pilots' union and resulted in an agreement on increasing wages by more than 15 percent by the end of the following year.

In 2008, Genscher joined former Czech President Václav Havel, former United States Ambassador to Germany John Kornblum and several other well-known political figures in calling for a Cold War museum to be built at Checkpoint Charlie in Berlin. In 2009 Genscher expressed public concern at Pope Benedict XVI's lifting of excommunication of the bishops of the Society of Saint Pius X. Genscher wrote in the Mitteldeutsche Zeitung: "Poles can be proud of Pope John Paul II. At the last papal election, we said We are the pope! But please—not like this." He argued that Pope Benedict XVI was making a habit of offending non-Catholics. "This is a deep moral and political question. It is about respect for the victims of crimes against humanity", Genscher said.

On 20 December 2013, it was revealed that Genscher played a key role in coordinating the release and flight to Germany of Mikhail Khodorkovsky, the former head of Yukos. Genscher had first met Khodorkovsky in 2002 and had chaired a conference at which Khodorkovsky blasted Russian President Vladimir Putin's pursuit of his oil company. Khodorkovsky asked his lawyers during a 2011 prison visit to let Genscher help mediate early release. Once Putin was re-elected in 2012, German Chancellor Angela Merkel instructed her officials to lobby for the president to meet Genscher. The subsequent negotiations involved two meetings between Genscher and Putin – one at Berlin Tegel Airport at the end of Putin's first visit to Germany after he was re-elected in 2012, the other in Moscow. While keeping the chancellor informed, Khodorkovsky's attorneys and Genscher spent the ensuing months developing a variety of legal avenues that could allow Putin to release his former rival early, ranging from amendments to existing laws to clemency. When Khodorkovsky's mother was in a Berlin hospital with cancer in November 2013, Genscher passed a message to Khodorkovsky suggesting the prisoner should write a pardon letter to Putin emphasizing his mother's ill health. Following Putin's pardoning of Khodorkovsky "for humanitarian reasons" in December 2013, a private plane provided by Genscher brought Khodorkovsky to Berlin for a family reunion at the Hotel Adlon.

Genscher signed on in 2014 to be a member of the Southern Corridor Advisory Panel, a BP-led consortium which includes former British Prime Minister Tony Blair and Peter Sutherland, chairman of Goldman Sachs International. The panel's purpose is to facilitate the expansion of a vast natural-gas field in the Caspian Sea and the building of two pipelines across Europe. The $45 billion enterprise, championed by the Azerbaijani president, Ilham Aliyev, has been called by critics "the Blair Rich Project".

== Death ==
Genscher died at his home outside Bonn in Wachtberg on 31 March 2016 from heart failure, 10 days after his 89th birthday.

== Other activities (selection) ==
- CARE Deutschland-Luxemburg, Chairman of the Board of Trustees
- Club of Budapest, Honorary Member
- German-Azerbaijani Forum, Honorary Chairman
- German-Polish Society (DPG), Deputy Chairman of the Board of Trustees
- Baltic Development Forum, Member of the Honorary Board
- Deutsche Gesellschaft für die Vereinten Nationen, Member of the Board of Trustees
- Dimitris Tsatsos Institute for European Constitutional Law at the FernUniversität Hagen, Member of the Board of Trustees
- EastWest Institute, Chairman Emeritus
- ELSA Deutschland, Member of the Advisory Board (1993–2008)
- Foundation Wittenberg-Center for Global Ethics, Member of the Board of Trustees
- Bonner Akademie für Forschung und Lehre praktischer Politik (BAPP), Member of the Board of Trustees
- Ilsenburg Abbey, Patron
- Martin Luther University of Halle-Wittenberg, Honorary Chairman of the Board of Trustees
- University of Bonn, Member of the Board of Trustees
- A Soul for Europe initiative, Member of the Board of Trustees
- Gedächtnis der Nation project, Member of the Board of Trustees

== Recognition (selection) ==
Genscher has been awarded honorary citizenship by his birthplace Halle (Saale) (in 1991) and the city of Berlin (in 1993).

- 1973 and 1975 – Order of Merit of the Federal Republic of Germany
- 1986 – Grand Cross of the Legion of Honour
- 1987 – Grand Cross of the Ordem do Mérito
- 1987 – Honorary Citizen of Costa Rica
- 1990 – Prince of Asturias Award
- 1992 – Order of Merit of the Republic of Poland
- 1992 – Order of Merit of the Republic of Hungary
- 1995 – Order of Duke Trpimir (Croatia)
- 1998 – Honorary doctorate of Tbilisi State University
- 2002 – Honorary doctorate of the University of Szczecin
- 2003 – Honorary doctorate of Leipzig University
- 2004 – Erich-Kästner-Preis
- 2006 – Peace Prize of the Friedrich Naumann Foundation
- 2007 – Order of Merit of North Rhine-Westphalia
- 2008 – Walther Rathenau-Preis
- 2010 – Order of Merit of Saxony-Anhalt
- 2010 – Millennium Bambi Award
- 2015 – Henry A. Kissinger Prize of the American Academy in Berlin (along with Giorgio Napolitano)
- 2015 – The National German Sustainability Award
- 2020 – The 20th Hanno R. Ellenbogen Citizenship Award along with Markus Meckel, Ivan Havel and Ivan Chvatik commemorating the 30th Anniversary of the fall of the Iron Curtain (jointly awarded by The Prague Society and Global Panel Foundation)

== Selected works ==
- Die Rolle Europas im Kontext der Globalisierung, in: Robertson-von Trotha, Caroline Y. (ed.): Herausforderung Demokratie. Demokratisch, parlamentarisch, gut? (= Kulturwissenschaft interdisziplinär/Interdisciplinary Studies on Culture and Society, Vol. 6), Baden-Baden 2011, ISBN 978-3-8329-5816-9
- (Hrsg.): Nach vorn gedacht … Perspektiven deutscher Aussenpolitik. Bonn Aktuell, Stuttgart 1987, ISBN 978-3-87959-290-6.
- Zukunftsverantwortung. Reden. Buchverlag Der Morgen, Berlin 1990, ISBN 978-3-371-00312-2.
- Unterwegs zur Einheit. Reden und Dokumente aus bewegter Zeit. Siedler, Berlin 1991, ISBN 978-3-88680-408-5.
- Wir wollen ein europäisches Deutschland. Siedler, Berlin 1991, Goldmann 1992 ISBN 978-3-442-12839-6.
- Politik aus erster Hand. Kolumnen des Bundesaußenministers a. D. Hans-Dietrich Genscher in der Nordsee-Zeitung Bremerhaven. Nordwestdeutsche Verlags-Gesellschaft, Bremerhaven 1992, ISBN 978-3-927857-36-0.
- Kommentare. ECON-Taschenbuch-Verlag, Düsseldorf/Wien 1994, ISBN 978-3-612-26185-4.
- Erinnerungen. Siedler, Berlin 1995, ISBN 978-3-88680-453-5; Goldmann, München 1997, ISBN 978-3-442-12759-7.
- Sternstunde der Deutschen. Hans-Dietrich Genscher im Gespräch mit Ulrich Wickert. Mit sechs Beiträgen. Hohenheim, Stuttgart/Leipzig 2000, ISBN 978-3-89850-011-1.
- Die Chance der Deutschen. Ein Gesprächsbuch. Hans-Dietrich Genscher im Gespräch mit Guido Knopp. Pendo, München 2008, ISBN 978-3-86612-190-4.
- Die Rolle Europas im Kontext der Globalisierung, in: Caroline Y. Robertson-von Trotha (Hrsg.): Herausforderung Demokratie. Demokratisch, parlamentarisch, gut? (= Kulturwissenschaft interdisziplinär/Interdisciplinary Studies on Culture and Society, Bd. 6), Baden-Baden 2011, ISBN 978-3-8329-5816-9.
- Zündfunke aus Prag. Wie 1989 der Mut zur Freiheit die Geschichte veränderte, mit Karel Vodička. dtv, München 2014, ISBN 978-3-423-28047-1.
- Meine Sicht der Dinge. Im Gespräch mit Hans-Dieter Heumann. Propyläen, Berlin, 2015, ISBN 978-3-549-07464-0.

== See also ==
- Politics of Germany
- History of Germany since 1945

Political offices
Preceded by Ernst Benda	Interior Minister of West Germany; 1969–1974	Succeeded by Werner Maihofer
Preceded by Walter Scheel	Foreign Minister of West Germany; 1974–1982	Succeeded by Helmut Schmidt; Acting
Preceded by Helmut Schmidt; Acting	Foreign Minister of West Germany; 1982–1990	Germany reunifies
Recreated Germany reunified	Foreign Minister of Germany; 1990–1992	Succeeded by Klaus Kinkel
Preceded by Walter Scheel	Vice-Chancellor of West Germany; 1974–1982	Succeeded by Egon Franke
Preceded by Egon Franke	Vice-Chancellor of West Germany; 1982–1990	Germany reunifies
Recreated Germany reunified	Vice-Chancellor of Germany; 1990–1992	Succeeded by Jürgen Wilhelm Möllemann
Diplomatic posts
Preceded by Post created	Chairman-in-Office of the OSCE; 1991	Succeeded by Jiří Dienstbier; Czechoslovakia
