= Ellemann-Jensen =

Ellemann-Jensen may refer to:

People

- Jakob Ellemann-Jensen, Danish politician
- Uffe Ellemann-Jensen, former Danish Minister of Foreign Affairs

Other

- Ellemann-Jensen doctrine, Danish idea aimed at promoting small countries' ability to gain influence in the world order
