= Abowd =

Abowd is a surname. Notable people with the surname include:

- Gregory Abowd (born 1964), American computer scientist
- John M. Abowd (born 1951), American economist
