= Elizabeth Cascio =

American economist

Elizabeth U. Cascio
- Education: Franklin & Marshall College; University of California, Berkeley
- Spouse: Ethan G. Lewis
- Children: 2
- Awards: 2014 Labour Economics Best Reviewer Award
- Scientific career
- Fields: Economics
- Workplaces: University of California, Davis, Dartmouth College
- Doctoral advisors: David Card
- Website: https://sites.dartmouth.edu/eucascio/

Elizabeth Cascio is an applied economist and currently a professor of economics who holds the DeWalt H. 1921 and Marie H. Ankeny Professorship in Economic Policy at Dartmouth College. Her research interests are in labor economics and public economics, and focus on the economic impact of policies affecting education in the United States. She is also a research associate at the National Bureau of Economic Research, a research associate at the IZA Institute of Labor Economics, and Co-editor of the Journal of Human Resources.

== Education ==
Elizabeth Cascio earned a BA in Economics from Franklin & Marshall College in 1997, and her PhD in 2003 from the University of California at Berkeley.

She was a professor at the University of California at Davis from 2003 through 2006, when she joined the Dartmouth College faculty.

== Research ==
Elizabeth U. Cascio is an economist who specializes in the historical analysis around social policies and education for children in the 20th century. Her research includes the socioeconomic ramifications of the civil rights movement in the 1970s, the inflow of immigrants into public schools in the 1970s, the impact of tchanging investments in education for young children in the 20th century, and the fracking boom in the 21st century. Her overall research focus is how policies benefit or harm the educational school system in the United States by analyzing them through a historical perspective.

Her paper comparing targeted with universal preschool programs was named one of the most important economics studies in 2017. She has argued for replacing existing federal child care tax policies with a single refundable federal child care tax credit that is more generous to lower-income families and families with younger children. She has also proposed investments in childcare quality-rating systems and expansion of universal preschool for 4-year-olds.

== Publications (2005-2015) ==
=== Schooling and the AFQT (2005) ===
One of the earliest papers written by Elizabeth is a paper that explores the correlation between education and AFQT tests. The AFQT stands for the Armed Forces Qualification Test and it serves as a test to determine the placement of soldiers into specific categories during the first world war. In her paper, Elizabeth U. Cascio along with economist Ethan G. Lewis use the AFQT as a measure by gathering statistics from the National Longitudinal Survey of Youth 1979 to determine the idea of nurture in schools. This paper tests the development of youth based on the scores they get on the AFQT to determine whether education has a direct correlation to different factors. Highlighted in this paper is the difference between the scores of people of colour or minorities and the majority culture. The paper attempts to identify if there are underlying connections between AFQT scores versus the type of education that minorities are receiving and the way they are being nurtured by society's standards. The findings of the paper indicates the number of years in school plays an important part in keeping races from varying differently as children age. The paper concludes by saying that through the results of the AFQT and research they believe that continued schooling supports better marks and earlier childhood education.

=== Public Preschool and Maternal Labor Supply: Evidence from the Introduction of Kindergartens into American Public Schools (2006) ===
In this paper written about the subsidization of kindergartens for public schools in American during the beginning to mid 1960s, Elizabeth U.Cascio talks about the benefits that this initiative had on at-risk populations, for example 5-year-old children with single-parents as well as the effect it had on maternal labor supply. The findings of the study indicate that single-mothers who had children who are aged 5-years-old responded strongly to this initiative and that instead of focusing on universal programs that benefit the general population, we should be focusing on state specific programs. The argument is that if we move towards universal programs it would take away from the neediest group of people.

=== Do Investments in Universal Early Education Pay Off? Long-term Effects of Introducing Kindergartens into Public Schools (2009) ===
In a paper written by Elizabeth U.Cascio she touches upon the topic of kindergartens in the 1960s and 70s long-term investments on public universal education. Much like in her earlier work, "Public Preschool and Maternal Labor Supply: Evidence from the Introduction of Kindergartens into American Public Schools (2006)", Elizabeth talks about state funding of public schools and education for five-year-old children. Her findings in this paper suggest the lower dropout rates for the rate of white children but no detection of benefit for universal programs. The findings in her paper suggests that in the long-run there are no higher quality alternatives for people of different races and backgrounds, so there should be investments in other areas of education and perhaps towards specialization. This research was covered in The New York Times.

=== Education and the age profile of literacy into adulthood (2008) ===
In this study written by Elizabeth U. Cascio under the National Bureau of Economic Research, she talks about literacy gains and how it is strongly correlated with higher education. Elizabeth Cascio compares the rates of which people go to higher education such as post-secondary school and beyond to determine how it is correlated to literacy gains from secondary-education. In this study, Elizabeth Cascio determines through various cases to determine whether a correlation exists between the strength of post-secondary education and literacy rates among adults. For example, referenced to in the article is the United States and the strong literacy rates between the teens and twenties that helped propelled them to catch up with other high-income earning countries.

=== Is Being in School Better? The Impact of School on Children's BMI When Starting Age is Endogenous (2011) ===
In this paper Elizabeth U.Cascio along with economists Patricia M. Anderson, Krisitn F. Butcher, and Diane Whitmore Schanzenbach research the relationship between Body Mass Index and education. The paper was written in response to the claims that children gain weight while they are in school due to unhealthy snacks and school lunches. The economists run a regression-discontinuity analysis to compare the weights of children who have spent different number of years in school to determine whether this is the case. The paper suggests that children do not gain more weight as they transition from elementary to secondary because there are certain policies and standards about food that are implemented in schools. The paper also considers that there are unobservable factors that attribute to weight and health that are otherwise unobservable within schools as well. The paper mentions genetics and the nurturing of children being a factor to weight gain and education. The paper finally concludes with the statement that there is not necessarily anything that would cause a child to gain weight during school periods. It is a situational scenario where certain schools lack in the provision of the proper food items they need to serve. The economists claim there needed to be more of a standardized policy to help ensure children are being fed nutritional food.

=== The Impacts of Expanding Access to High-Quality Preschool Education (2013) ===
In collaboration with economist Diane Whitmore Schanzenbach, Elizabeth U.Cascio writes a paper under the National Bureau of Economics about the "Pre-school for all" initiative which would thereby increase the number of 4 year olds attending more pre-school. The increase of quality and participation in public pre-school was analyzed in the article and determined very different results based on the income status of families across the various social classes. It is beneficial for children who come from lower income earning families as the research shows that they have sustained better math skills, engaged in more physical activities, and spent more time with their families. On the contrary, the effect for higher income earning households have less of an impact. Families from better economic backgrounds typically switch from private schools to public schools, which does not necessarily benefit the child. In addition, the economists believe that the amount of money saved from this transition would go back into the child's existing funds which would save money for lower earning households, but not for high earning ones. This research was covered in The Economist.

=== Who Needs a Fracking Education? The Educational Response to Low-Skill Biased Technological Change (2015) ===
The article "Who Needs a Fracking Education? The Educational Response to Low-Skill Biased Technological Change" written by Elizabeth U. Cascio and Ayushi Narayan talks about the technological breakthrough of fracking. Fracking is a technique used by many in the oil industry. The process requires you to insert a large tube into the ground and shoot out a lot of pressure using a specific type of liquid. This brings the oil and other valuable items onto surface level. It is because of this breakthrough that there was more demand during the years of 2011-2015 for low uneducated skill workers in the oil industry. The economists imply that the education market is elastic as there was a severe drop-out rate of 1% in education during the years of 2011–2015. The article then continues to list the possible pros such as immediate gratification due to salary in a thriving industry, but also says that the benefits of an education in the long-run as people with education is often overlooked. The paper concludes by saying that overall the response to technological change is merely situational in most cases and are sometimes localized based on geographical location. This research was covered by Business Insider.

== Selected works ==
- Cascio, Elizabeth U. "Maternal labor supply and the introduction of kindergartens into American public schools." Journal of Human Resources 44 (1), 140–170
- Cascio, Elizabeth U. and Ebonya Washington. "Valuing the vote: The redistribution of voting rights and state funds following the voting rights act of 1965." The Quarterly Journal of Economics 129 (1), 379–433
- Cascio, Elizabeth, Nora Gordon, Ethan G. Lewis, and Sarah Reber. "Paying for progress: Conditional grants and the desegregation of southern schools." The Quarterly Journal of Economics 125 (1), 445–482
- Cascio, Elizabeth, Nora Gordon, and Sarah Reber. "Local responses to federal grants: Evidence from the introduction of Title I in the South."American Economic Journal: Economic Policy 5 (3), 126–59
- Cascio, E. U., Lewis, E. G., Research, National Bureau of Economic, & NBER Working Papers. (2005). Schooling and the AFQT: Evidence from school entry laws. National Bureau of Economic Research.
- Cascio, E., Research, National Bureau of Economic, & NBER Working Papers. (2006). Public preschool and maternal labor supply: Evidence from the introduction of kindergartens into american public schools. National Bureau of Economic Research.
- Cascio, E. U., Research, National Bureau of Economic, & NBER Working Papers. (2009). Do investments in universal early education pay off? long-term effects of introducing kindergartens into public schools. National Bureau of Economic Research.
- Cascio, E., & NBER Working Papers. (2008). Education and the age profile of literacy into adulthood. National Bureau of Economic Research.
- Anderson, P. M., Schanzenbach, D. W., Cascio, E. U., & Butcher, K. (2011). Is being in school better? the impact of school on children's BMI when starting age is endogenous. National Bureau of Economic Research.
- Cascio, E. U., Lewis, E. G., Research, National Bureau of Economic, & NBER Working Papers. (2018). Distributing the green (cards): Permanent residency and personal income taxes after the immigration reform and control act of 1986 National Bureau of Economic Research.
