= Francis Kramarz =

French economist

Francis Kramarz (born March 8, 1958) is a French economist. Until 2024, he was Professor at the École Nationale de la Statistique et de l'Administration Économique (ENSAE), where he directed the Center for Research in Economics and Statistics (CREST). He is one of the leading labour economists in France.

== Biography ==
Francis Kramarz studied at the École Polytechnique (1976–79), École Nationale de la Statistique et de l'Administration Économique (1979-81), and earned a Ph.D. in economics from the Université Paris X in 1994. During and shortly after his Ph.D., Kramarz worked as a researcher in the Research Department of the Institut national de la statistique et des études économiques (INSEE) and also directed that department from 1996 to 2007. He then worked first as an adjunct professor (1997-2010) and later as an associate professor (2010-2024) at the École Polytechnique. Moreover, he has been a professor of economics at ENSAE between 2007 and 2024, where he also has served as director of the Center for Research in Economics and Statistics (CREST). In addition to his academic positions, Kramarz has also worked in several advisory positions, including in the Council of Economic Analysis (2010–13), the Swedish Employment Commission, and in the Council for Employment Orientation. He is also affiliated with the IZA Institute of Labor Economics. In recognition of his research contributions, he was elected to be a fellow of the Econometric Society in 2013 and also is a fellow of the European Economic Association.

== Research ==
The research interests of Francis Kramarz include labour economics, microeconometrics, matched employer-employee data sets, and the analysis of firms and workers in international trade. In his research, Kramarz has frequently collaborated with John Abowd. According to IDEAS/RePEc, he belongs to the top 1% of economists as ranked by research output.

=== Research on labour economics ===
Most of Kramarz' research deals with various aspects of labour economics. Comparing the United States, Canada and France, Kramarz, David Card and Thomas Lemieux observe that the relative wages of less-skilled workers fell less during the 1980s in those countries with the most rigid labour market institutions, though these wage inflexibilities aren't found to explain the differences between the countries' relative employment growth. Moreover, in research with Horst Entorf and Michel Gollac, Kramarz finds that workers using ICT are 15-20% better paid than non-users, though this differential predates the introduction of ICT and likely reflects that ICT users higher inherent ability; as ICT users become more experienced, annual returns to ICT amount to 1-2% of users' wages and the likelihood of cyclical layoffs decreases for them.

A particularly fruitful area of Kramarz' research has been the use of linked employer-employee data sets, which match information from households and individuals with information about the businesses or establishments they work in and which he describes at length together with John Abowd in the Handbook of Labor Economics. In research with Abowd and David Margolis, he finds that person effects account for 90% of inter-industry and 75% of firm size wage differentials in France and that firms which hire high-wage workers are more productive but not more profitable, though they become profitable once person effects are taken into account. Moreover, with Abowd and Patrick Corbel, Kramarz finds that for each job created in the French private sector in a given year, three persons are hired and two job separations occur, whereas for each job destroyed, two separations occur yet only one hiring, with effects in both cases persisting even when controlling for skill group and the bulk of these worker flows are associated with short-term contracts; thus, employment adjustments in the private sector are made primarily by changing their hiring and not through changes in separations. Abowd and Kramarz also find that separation costs in France are degressively increasing in the number of exits, though with a large fixed component, whereas hiring costs are much lower and essentially zero for short-term contracts, driving French firms to adjust employment primarily through increases and decreases in hiring.

Kramarz has studied the labour market effects of various French policies, such as zoning boards or working time reductions, as well as the relationship between youth unemployment and crime as well as between social ties and youths' school-to-work transitions. For instance, analysing the impact of entry regulation on job creation in France with Marianne Bertrand, Kramarz finds that regional zoning boards' tendency to deter the creation or extension of retail stores increased retailer concentration and slowed down employment growth. With Bruno Crépon, Kramarz finds that the mandatory reduction of the workweek from 40 to 39 hours in France in 1982 decreased employment by 2-4%. In research with Denis Fougère and Julien Pouget, Kramarz finds that crime and unemployment - especially youth unemployment - are positively correlated in France, suggesting that policies aimed at reducing youth unemployment may also contribute to decreases in burglaries, thefts, and drug offenses. Finally, in an extensive study of the role of social networks with regard to youth labour market entries in Sweden with Oskar Nordström Skans, he finds that strong social ties (e.g. parents) are an important determinants for where young workers find their first job, especially for "weak" graduates in times of high unemployment or for graduates whose parents have good jobs or work in particularly productive establishments; overall, strong social ties benefit youth in terms of faster and better school-to-work transitions, including longer job match durations for their first jobs and better wage growth; by contrast, firms benefit due to such youths relatively lower entry wages and a strong drop in their parents' wage growth.

==== Research on minimum wages ====
As part of his research in labour economics, Kramarz has investigated the economics of minimum wages. For example, together with several co-authors, he found that minimum wages in Europe between the mid-1960s and mid-1990s have only caused higher unemployment if they kept the wages of low-wage jobs from decreasing, are relatively small for young people (relative to average earnings) when compared to the U.S., and don't appear to have reduced employment, except possibly for young workers. In further research comparing minimum wages in France and in the U.S. (with Abowd, Lemieux and Margolis), Kramarz finds that minimum wages do decrease the employment of youth, who are the by far most affected group, though in France the effect is somewhat mitigated through employment promotion programmes targeted at unemployed youth. Finally, in research with Thomas Philippon, Kramarz observes that French payroll tax subsidies appear to induce substitution between those earning the minimum wage or slightly more and receiving the subsidy and those who don't, even if the latter have slightly lower wages; essentially, a 1% increase in labour costs increases the likelihood of employees' loss of employment by 1.5%.

=== Research on international trade ===
Besides his research on labour economics, Kramarz has also extensively studied international trade. Using French customs data, Kramarz, Jonathan Eaton and Samuel Kortum observe that most French firms only sell within France, only very few firms sell to many different foreign markets, the number of French firms selling to a foreign market, relative to French market share, increases systematically with market size, the distribution of sales are similar across markets of very different size and extent of French participation, and average sales in France rise systematically with selling to less popular markets and to more markets. Modeling these relationships, they find over half of the variation in firms' market entry decisions to be attributable to differences in firm-specific efficiency, suggesting that the gains of trade are likely to be concentrated among the most efficient firms and, while net positive, may displace less efficient firms. In related research with Pierre Biscourp, Kramarz observes that, in France, import growth, especially of finished goods, strongly correlates with job destruction, especially of production jobs, with the strength of that relationship particularly large for larger firms.

=== Other research ===
Kramarz and David Thesmar find that the social networks of French CEOs and those of their directors are strongly correlated, especially for former high-ranking civil servants, and, in those firms wherein these networks are most active, CEO pay tends to be higher, the likelihood of dismissal for an underperforming CEO asis lower, and there are less value-creating acquisitions, suggesting that social networks in the boardroom may deteriorate corporate governance.
