= Nicole Maestas =

American economist

- Education: Wellesley College; University of California, Berkeley
- Scientific career
- Fields: Economics
- Workplaces: Harvard University
- Doctoral advisors: David Card

Nicole A. Maestas is an American economist who is the Margaret T. Morris Professor of Health Care Policy at Harvard Medical School and a Research Associate of the National Bureau of Economic Research (NBER), where she directs the NBER's Retirement and Disability Research Center.

== Biography ==
Nicole Maestas earned a BA in English and Spanish from Wellesley College in 1991. She then received her M.P.P. in Public Policy from the Goldman School of Public Policy at UC Berkeley in 1997, and her Ph.D. in Economics also from UC Berkeley in 2002. Prior to joining the faculty at the Harvard Medical School, she worked at the RAND Corporation, where she served as director of the Economics, Sociology, and Statistics Research Department as well as in other leadership roles and taught in the Pardee RAND Graduate School.

She was elected a Member of the National Academy of Medicine in 2024.

=== Selected works ===
- Maestas, Nicole, Kathleen J. Mullen, and Alexander Strand. 2013. "Does Disability Insurance Receipt Discourage Work? Using Examiner Assignment to Estimate Causal Effects of SSDI Receipt." American Economic Review, 103 (5): 1797–1829.
- Card, David, Carlos Dobkin, and Nicole Maestas. 2008. "The Impact of Nearly Universal Insurance Coverage on Health Care Utilization: Evidence from Medicare." American Economic Review, 98 (5): 2242–58.
- Zhu, W., Chernew, M.E., Sherry, T.B. and Maestas, N., 2019. Initial opioid prescriptions among US commercially insured patients, 2012–2017. New England Journal of Medicine, 380(11), pp.1043-1052.
- Maestas, Nicole, Kathleen J. Mullen, and David Powell. 2023. "The Effect of Population Aging on Economic Growth, the Labor Force, and Productivity." American Economic Journal: Macroeconomics, 15 (2): 306–32.
- Maestas, Nicole, Kathleen J. Mullen, David Powell, Till von Wachter, and Jeffrey B. Wenger. 2023. "The Value of Working Conditions in the United States and the Implications for the Structure of Wages." American Economic Review, 113 (7): 2007–47.
