= Nicole Fortin =

Canadian economist

Nicole M. Fortin
- Born: 1954 (age 71–72); Montreal, Quebec, Canada
- Spouse: Thomas Lemieux

Academic background
- Education: Université de Montréal; B.Sc. in Mathematics 1976; M.Sc. in Operations Research 1978; M.Sc. in Environmental Sciences 1981; University of British Columbia; Ph.D. in Economics 1988

Academic work
- Discipline: Labour Economics; Applied Econometrics; Economics of Gender; Wage Inequality; Higher Education
- Website: https://economics.ubc.ca/faculty-and-staff/nicole-fortin/

Nicole M. Fortin (born 1954) is a Professor in the Vancouver School of Economics (VSE) at University of British Columbia, where she obtained her Ph.D. in Economics. Before moving to Vancouver, B.C. in 1999, Fortin taught at Université de Montréal for ten years in her hometown. She was the President of the Canadian Women Economic Network (CWEN) in 2013–2014. Her research focus is placed on three main themes, including the linkage between labour market institutions and wage inequality, issues related to the economic progress of gender equality, as well as contributions to decomposition methods. Notably, Fortin contributed to the ground-breaking research presented in the 2015 World Happiness Report by examining how various factors (e.g. gender and age) impact feelings of happiness for individuals, and societal well-being overall, across the globe.

== Education and work ==
Nicole Fortin earned a B.Sc. in mathematics in 1976, two M.Sc. in operations research and environmental sciences in 1978 and 1981 from the Université de Montréal and Universite du Quebec a Trois-Rivieres, respectively. Thereafter, she did a Ph.D. in economics at University of British Columbia. After her graduation in 1988, she became an assistant professor of economics at Université de Montréal but moved to Vancouver for the University of British Columbia's Vancouver School of Economics in 1999. There, she was promoted to full professor in 2004. In addition to her academic position, Fortin joined IZA Institute of Labor Economics as a research fellow in February 2011, and was a research fellow in the Social Interactions, Identity and Well-Being (SIIWB) program of the Canadian Institute for Advanced Research from 2007 to 2017. Furthermore, she has also involved herself in referee activity for various journals, such as American Economic Review, American Economic Journal: Applied Economics, Canadian Journal of Economics, Econometrica, Industrial and Labor Relations Review, Journal of Applied Econometrics, Journal of Econometrics, Journal of Human Resources, Labour Economics, Quarterly Journal of Economics and World Bank Review.

== Scholarship and selected publications ==
Nicole Fortin's research focus revolves around three main themes:

1. Wage inequality and its links to labour market institutions and public policies
2. Economic progress of women and gender equality
3. Contributions to decomposition method

=== Research on labour market institutions and wage inequality ===
==== "Top Income Inequality and the Gender Pay Gap: Canada, Sweden, and the United Kingdom" (2017) ====
To explore the consequences of the under-representation of women among top-earners for the overall gender pay gap, Nicole Fortin, Brian Bell and Michael Boehm employ administrative annual earnings data from three different countries, namely Canada, Sweden, and the United Kingdom. They apply the approach used when analysing the earnings inequality among top incomes, and reweighting techniques, to the exploration of the gender pay gap. They argue that substantial "swimming upstream" effects were the result of the recent rise in top incomes, therefore accounting for differential progress in the gender gap in wages across time and an expanding gap that could not be explained by traditional factors.

==== "Foreign Human Capital and the Earnings Gap between Immigrants and Canadian-born Workers" (2016) ====
Nicole Fortin, Thomas Lemieux and Javier Torres use new information regarding the location of the immigrant study available in the 2006 Canadian Census to estimate the returns to Canadian and foreign human capital. They find that controlling the source of human capital (Canadian vs. foreign) explains a large part of the wage gap between immigrants and natives. They also demonstrate that the commonly used imputation procedures (e.g. Friedberg, 2000) that allocate national and foreign education according to age at arrival is more likely to overestimate the returns to foreign education and underestimate the returns to foreign work experience. They also argue that the wage gap between immigrants and natives is very heterogeneous across all places of birth, even after including the location fixed effects, although this inclusion significantly reduces the negative effects of the country of origin in countries such as China, Pakistan and India. The authors also observe a substantial heterogeneity in the mobility of human capital.

==== "Labor Market Institutions and the Distribution of Wages, 1973-1992: A Semiparametric Approach" (1996) ====
John DiNardo, Thomas Lemieux and Nicole Fortin employ the semiparametric regression approach to analyse the impacts of various institutional changes and labour market factors on wage distribution. The procedure provides a visually clear representation of where in the density of wages these various factors exert the greatest impact. Using data from the Current Population Survey (CPS), they find similar results as in previous research. De-unionization and supply and demand shocks were key factors to account for the increasing wage inequality from 1979 to 1988. Moreover, they find that a decline in the real value of the minimum wage during the 1980s contributes to a massive proportion of a wider gender pay gap despite a nominal rise in the minimum wage, where the effect is found to be more significant among women.

=== Research on economic progress of women, gender equality and gender issues in education ===
==== "Computer Gaming and the Gender Math Gap: Cross-Country Evidence among Teenagers" (2018) ====
Fortin co-authored this research with Yann Algan. They employ the Programme for International Student Assessment (PISA) surveys to determine whether the gender gap in math test scores correlates with computer (digital devices) gaming. Using a decomposition based on a pooled hybrid specification, they find that 13% to 29% of the gender math gap exists due to gender differences in the incidence and returns to intense gaming. They argue that there is a potential role for gaming network effects as they compare and contrast the negative and positive girl-specific effects found for collaborative games and single-player games.

==== "Leaving Boys Behind: Gender Disparities in High Academic Achievement" (2015) ====
Fortin, Philip Oreopoulos, and Shelley Phipps employ three decades of data from the "Monitoring the Future" cross-sectional surveys to show that the mode of girls' high school GPA distribution has shifted from "B" to "A" from the 1980s to the 2000s. This essentially leave boys behind as the mode of boys' GPA distribution remains the same at "B". In a reweighted OB decomposition of achievement at each GPA level, they find that gender differences in tertiary education expectations, controlling for school ability, and as early as 8th grade are the most crucial factor to account for this trend. They find that the growing population of girls aiming for a postgraduate degree are adequate to explain the rise in the proportion of girls obtaining "A's" over time. The relatively greater share of boys receiving "C" and "C+" can be accounted for by a more frequent misbehaviour at school, as well as a greater portion of boys only aiming to finish a two-year college degree.

=== Research on decomposition methods ===
==== "Decomposing Wage Distributions using Recentered Influence Function Regressions" (2018) ====
Nicole Fortin co-authored with Sergio Firpo and Thomas Lemieux to explain an extension of the Oaxaca-Blinder decomposition method that can be applied to various distributional measures. First of all, it requires the division of distributional changes into a wage structure effect and a composition effect using a reweighting method. Second of all, it requires the further division of the two components into the contribution of each explanatory variable using recentered influence function (RIF) regressions. They demonstrate the practical aspects of the procedure by exploring how factors, such as de-unionization, education, occupations, and industry changes, impacted the polarization of U.S. male wages from the late 1980s to the mid 2010s.

==== "Decomposition Methods" (2010) ====
This chapter, authored by Thomas Lemieux, Sergio Firpo and Nicole Fortin, provides an overview of decomposition methods that have been developed after the seminal work of Oaxaca and Blinder in the early 1970s. These methods could be applied to decompose the divergence in a distributional statistic between two groups, or its change over time, into various explanatory factors. While the original work of Oaxaca and Blinder considered the case of the mean, their main focus is placed on other distributional statistics aside the mean (e.g. quantiles, the Gini coefficient or the variance). They also discuss the assumptions required in order to identify the various decomposition elements, different estimation methods are also proposed in the chapter. The authors also demonstrate how these methods work practically by discussing existing applications and working through a set of empirical examples.

== Research grants and awards ==
Year	Grant/Award	Institution
2016	Killam Research Prize	University of British Columbia
2015	Mike McCracken Award for Economic Statistics (jointly with Lars Osberg and Miles Corak)	Canadian Economics Association
2016-2021	Insight Grant (with Thomas Lemieux)	Social Sciences and Humanities Research Council
2011-2016	Individual Grant	Social Sciences and Humanities Research Council
2009-2015	Transnational FORFACE Grant (with Thomas Lemieux)	Social Sciences and Humanities Research Council
2007-2010	Individual Grant	Social Sciences and Humanities Research Council
2003-2007	INE - Individual Grant	Social Sciences and Humanities Research Council
2002-2007	INE - TARGET MCRI Grant	Social Sciences and Humanities Research Council
1999-2004	MRCI Grant - ESC Project	Social Sciences and Humanities Research Council
1999-2003	Individual Grant	Social Sciences and Humanities Research Council
1997-2000	F.C.A.R. Team (with T. Lemieux, M. Humberman and D. Parent)	
1996	Winner Minnesota Award (with J. DiNardo and T. Lemieux)	
1996-1999	Grant (with T. Lemieux)	Social Sciences and Humanities Research Council
1993-1996	F.C.A.R. Team (with F. Vailancourt, J.M. Cousineau, K. Cannings and T. Lemieux)	
1990-1992	Grant	Social Sciences and Humanities Research Council
1990-1993	F.C.A.R. Team (with G. Dionne, C. Fluet, L. Eeckoudt, N. Doherty)	
1987-1988	Excellence Fund	Government of British Columbia
1983-1985	Transport Canada Fellowship	Transport Canada
1981-1984	F.C.A.C. Doctorate Scholarship	
1980-1982	Natural Sciences and Engineering Research Council Fellowship	Natural Sciences and Engineering Research Council
1978-1980	Direction Générale de l'Enseignement Supérieur Master's Scholarship	Université de Montréal
