= Alice Vestergaard =

Danish journalist

Alice Vestergaard Ellemann-Jensen (born 29 July 1937 in Aabybro) is a former Danish journalist, newspaper editor-in-chief and television news coordinator. Now retired, she is remembered in particular as being the first woman to read the radio news on Danmarks Radio in 1963 and for being appointed to head TV 2's newly established news service in 1988. In 1971, she married Uffe Ellemann-Jensen (1941–2022), who served as Denmark's foreign minister.

== Early life, family and education ==
Alice Vestergaard was born on 29 July 1937 on a farm in Aabybro in the north of Jutland. After a teacher had noticed her talent for writing, she served an apprenticeship with the local newspaper Haslev Folketidende. She gained experience writing obituaries and reporting on local football matches and parish council meetings. Vestergaard first married in 1955 with the actor Per Wiking with whom she had her first child. The marriage was dissolved in 1971. In 1971 she married the politician Uffe Ellemann-Jensen until his death in June 2022. Together they had a son, Jakob, in 1973.

== Career ==
After her parents divorced, Vestergaard had to earn her own living. As a result, in 1959 she worked for the newspaper Vendsyssel Tidende before moving to Danmarks Radio. In 1963, she became the first woman to read the radio news, causing quite a stir. Two years later, she went on to present the television news, TV Avisen, soon acting as news anchor. In 1985, Vestergaard was appointed editor-in-chief for the women's journal Søndags B.T.. Two years later, she gained wide attention for becoming head of the news service for the newly created channel TV 2.
