= Center for Research in Economics and Statistics =

The Center for Research in Economics and Statistics (CREST) is the center of research of the INSEE, the French National Institute for Statistics and Economic Studies. The research center is affiliated with the ENSAE graduate school. It has been directed by Arnak Dalalyan since 2020. Before Dalalyan, it had been directed by Francis Kramarz since 2007.

It includes several laboratories in econometrics, macroeconomics, microeconomics, statistics, finance, mathematics, and sociology.

It is ranked 9th research center in Economics in the world, 2nd in Europe and 1st in France by www.econphd.net See ranking here

== Objectives ==
The general objective of CREST is to play an active role in the international development of research in two main fields:

- economic and social modeling
- conception and implementation of statistical methods

This general goal can be broken down into four more specific objectives:

- The training of graduate students
- The production and diffusion of research
- The exchange and management of visitors programs
- The links with firms and public administrations

=== The training of graduate students ===
CREST organizes advanced PhD courses and participates in the supervision of dissertations. Over forty research students are currently working on their dissertations at the center. French and foreign students and apply for a CREST fellowship.

The CREST maintains very close relationships with the ENSAE, the Graduate School of INSEE.

=== The production and diffusion of research ===
The CREST production is important both in the theoretical and the applied fields. The center organizes eight regular seminars and many international conferences (more than ten conferences over the last five years). The Centre also publishes a series of working papers, an information letter and an annual report.

=== Exchange and visitors programs ===
Invitations of junior and senior researchers are part of the Center's policy. The length of the visits varies between one week and one year and financial support is available. In addition, CREST is involved in several international networks, both in the doctoral field (the European Doctoral Program in quantitative economics, for example) and in research (Human Capital and Mobility networks, for instance).

=== Links with firms and public administrations ===
In particular with INSEE. Several members of CREST are advisors for French firms or administrations. CREST also has strong links with INSEE: on the one hand, CREST benefits from the statistical data available at INSEE, and, on the other hand, the Center provides expertise for various studies and training programs.
