= EuroFaculty =

Baltic educational institution

EuroFaculty was an educational institution in the Baltic states in reforming higher education in Economics, Law, Public Administration and Business Administration.

== History ==
At the founding meeting of the Council of the Baltic Sea States (CBSS) in 1992, the German Minister of Foreign Affairs Hans-Dietrich Genscher suggested the establishment of a “Euro-faculty” to reform the Baltic universities in Estonia, Latvia, and Lithuania to Western standards with respect to Economics, Political Science, and Law.

The idea was immediately supported by the Danish Minister of Foreign Affairs Uffe Ellemann-Jensen and EU Commissioner Henning Christophersen, and a draft paper on the creation of a Euro-faculty was accepted at the founding CBSS meeting with the implicit expectation that the Western member states as well as the EU would become donors to the faculty.

The faculty, under the name EuroFaculty, was (like the CBSS) established by the Ministers of Foreign Affairs (MFAs) in the enthusiastic atmosphere surrounding the regained independence of Estonia, Latvia, and Lithuania.

However, the CBSS as well as the EuroFaculty were decided upon without subsequent parliamentary approval, and without an official legal status, thus being, broadly speaking, based on the personal friendships which developed among MFAs during the fight for freedom of the Baltic states. Unfortunately, the core group of MFAs behind the CBSS (and the EuroFaculty) left office within a year after the creation of the CBSS.

The idea about creating a “Euro-faculty” was saved by the personal engagement of Franz Peter Küpper from the European Commission, who guided the EuroFaculty to obtaining EU support in the first years. It was also helpful that the German contribution came through Deutscher Akademischer Austauschdienst, (DAAD), which was efficient as donor due to its position as (relatively) independent of political changes.

== Structure ==
The EuroFaculty had its headquarters at the University of Latvia in Riga, and was besides organized with sections, at each of the universities in Tartu, Riga, and Vilnius. Connected to the EuroFaculty project were the Stockholm School of Economics in Riga and the Riga Graduate School of Law.

The board of the EuroFaculty (the steering committee) was composed of members representing the EU and the CBSS member countries, and was chaired by (among others) the Danish professor Nikolaj Petersen and later by the Latvian professor Baiba Rivža.

An academic committee representing the universities of the member countries was chaired by the German rector of Greifswald University, Jürgen Kohler, one of the leading personalities behind the Bologna declaration.

Foreign professors came from Denmark, Norway, the United Kingdom, Finland, Sweden, the U.S., the Netherlands, and Germany. Including local teaching associates, student teaching assistants, student research assistants and three vice-directors, the EuroFaculty annually employed around 100 people.

== Defiance ==
As the EuroFaculty's first director, the Estonian-Canadian professor Toivo Miljan had to build up the EuroFaculty from the very bottom. The EuroFaculty suffered from a lack of legality which could only be ignored during the pioneering period. He ended up being forced away by the European Commission because of his anti-bureaucratic attitude. New waves changed the rules, and the idea that the EU would support the EuroFaculty in line with the Baltic Sea donor countries was subsequently derailed.

Toivo Miljan's successor was the Norwegian professor Arild Saether. During his time as director real academic progress became apparent, as the EuroFaculty students performed brilliantly internationally and the EuroFaculty gained increasing prestige. The EuroFaculty became recognized as the strongest institution for substantial pan-Baltic cooperation. However, Arild Saether was caught up in a Sisyphus fight with the many-headed donor corps composed of national states, which, good in will, but weak in action, made his job feel impossible to cope with and to implement, and consequently he decided to leave office.

The Danish economist Gustav N. Kristensen subsequently became director of a mature and successful EuroFaculty, which in spite of financial difficulties would reap the fruits of systematic work during many years. In their capacity as observer countries of the CBSS, the Netherlands joined the EuroFaculty and provided teachers. Likewise, the U.S. made a highly efficient support to the EuroFaculty by its Fulbright Program.

== Results ==
The EuroFaculty successfully attracted a large number of outstanding Baltic students to its programs and made a significant impact on the Baltic university system. A former EuroFaculty student, Kaspars Balodis, became dean of law at the University of Latvia in 2002 and later, in 2006, judge at the Constitutional Court in Latvia. Another EuroFaculty student, Vytautas Nekrošius, became dean of law at Vilnius University in 2003.

The EuroFaculty delivered highly qualified staff to the national banks and the Central Administration in the Baltic states, as well as to the World Trade Organization and the World Bank.

Several members of the Baltic parliaments are former EuroFaculty students. One of the EuroFaculty's first students, Nils Ushakovs became Mayor of Riga in 2009. Baiba Rivža became Minister of Education and Science in Latvia in 2006. Vjačeslavs Dombrovskis, Latvian Minister of Education and Science, is also a EuroFaculty alumnus and former teaching assistant.

The EuroFaculty set up the Baltic Journal of Economics during its period of leadership in Baltic research within social sciences.

In May 2004, Estonia, Latvia, and Lithuania became members of the European Union. This new structure led to the closing down of the EuroFaculty Tartu-Riga-Vilnius in 2005.

A major reason for the success of the EuroFaculty was the fascination in Western Europe and America for the three Baltic states and the enthusiasm surrounding their regained independence.

Outside the EU a EuroFaculty was later established in Kaliningrad (2000–2007) and in Pskov (2009 and onwards).

== Sources ==
- Kristensen, Gustav N. 2010. Born into a Dream. EuroFaculty and the Council of the Baltic Sea States. Berliner Wissenschafts-Verlag.
- The EuroFaculty Report 1993–2005. (https://web.archive.org/web/20070609142311/http://www.eurofaculty.lv/FinalEF10.B2.pdf)
