= David Card =

Canadian economist (born 1956)

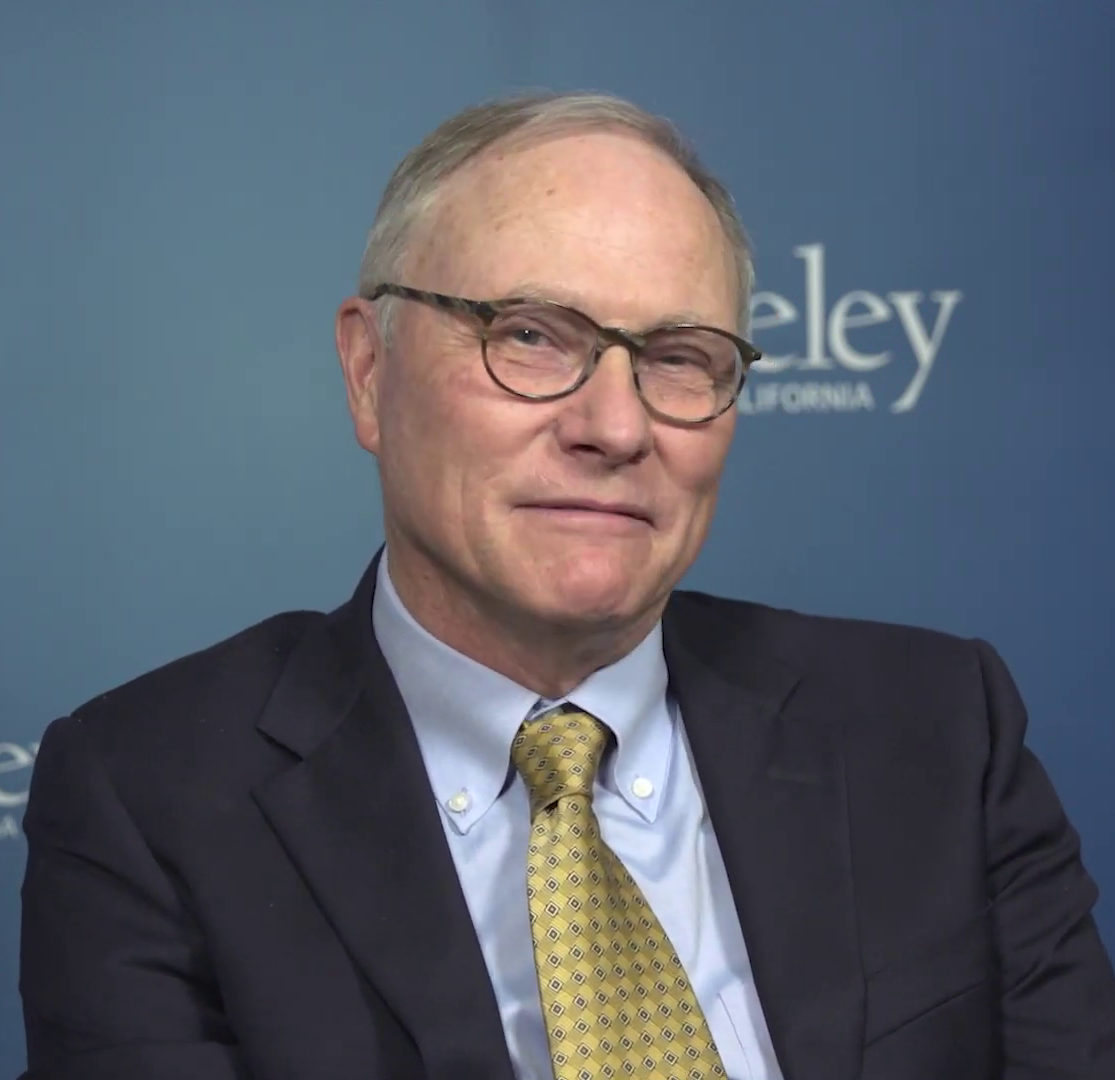
- Card in 2021
- Born: 1956 (age 69–70); Guelph, Ontario, Canada

Academic background
- Education: Queen's University at Kingston (BA); Princeton University (MA, PhD)
- Doctoral advisor: Orley Ashenfelter

Academic work
- Discipline: Labour economics
- Institutions: University of California, Berkeley; University of Chicago
- Doctoral students: Thomas Lemieux; Phillip B. Levine; Christoph M. Schmidt; Michael Greenstone; Jesse Rothstein; Philip Oreopoulos; David Lee; Janet Currie; Enrico Moretti; Heather Royer; Elizabeth Cascio; Ethan G. Lewis; Nicole Maestas
- Awards: John Bates Clark Medal (1995); IZA Labor Economics Award (2006); Frisch Medal (2008); BBVA Foundation Frontiers of Knowledge Award (2014); Jacob Mincer Award (2019); Nobel Memorial Prize in Economic Sciences (2021)
- Website: Information at IDEAS / RePEc

David Edward Card (born 1956) is a Canadian-American labour economist and the Class of 1950 Professor of Economics at the University of California, Berkeley, where he has been since 1997. He was awarded half of the 2021 Nobel Memorial Prize in Economic Sciences "for his empirical contributions to labour economics", with Joshua Angrist and Guido Imbens jointly awarded the other half.

== Early life and career ==
David Card was born in Guelph, Ontario, in 1956, to a family of dairy farmers. Card is a graduate of John F. Ross Collegiate Vocational Institute, in which he attended from 1970 to 1975. Card was originally pursuing a degree in physics, before switching to economics during his undergraduate studies. He then earned his Bachelor of Arts degree from Queen's University in 1978 and his Ph.D. degree in economics in 1983 from Princeton University, after completing a doctoral dissertation titled "Indexation in long term labor contracts" under the supervision of Orley Ashenfelter.

Card began his career at the University of Chicago Graduate School of Business, where he was assistant professor of Business Economics from 1982 to 1983. He was on the faculty at Princeton from 1983 to 1997, before moving to the University of California, Berkeley. He then served as a visiting professor at Columbia University 1990 to 1991. From 1988 to 1992, Card was Associate Editor of the Journal of Labor Economics, and from 1993 to 1997, he was co-editor of Econometrica. From 2002 to 2005, he was co-editor of The American Economic Review.

== Academic work ==
In the early 1990s, Card received much attention for his finding, together with his then Princeton University colleague Alan B. Krueger that, contrary to widely accepted beliefs among economists, the minimum wage increase in New Jersey did not result in job reduction of fast food companies in that state. While the methodology (see difference in differences) and its claim have been disputed (see minimum wage for discussion), later studies of minimum wage increases have tended to confirm Card and Krueger's findings, and many economists, including Joseph Stiglitz and Paul Krugman, accept these findings.

David Card has also made contributions to research on immigration, education, job training and inequality. Much of Card's work centers on a comparison between the United States and Canada in various situations. On immigration, Card's research has shown that the economic impact of new immigrants is minimal. Card has done several case studies on the rapid assimilation of immigrant groups, finding that they have little or no impact on wages. For example, Card studied the economic impacts of the Mariel boatlift, and compared the economic effects in Miami to those in Atlanta, Houston, Los Angeles and Tampa, which receive fewer Cuban immigrants. Card found that despite the drastic increase in low-skilled labor in Miami by 7%, wages for the low-skilled workers were not significantly affected. Furthermore, he found that overall unemployment rates and wages for the labor market as a whole in Miami were unchanged by the sudden influx of immigrants. In an interview with The New York Times, Card said, "I honestly think the economic arguments [against immigration] are second order. They are almost irrelevant."

Despite the fact that Card sometimes researches issues with strong political implications, he does not publicly take a stand on political issues or make policy suggestions. Nevertheless, his work is regularly cited in support of increased immigration and minimum wage legislation.

He served as the expert witness for Harvard in the 2018 Harvard admissions case.

== Contributions to Economics of Education ==
David Card has made influential contributions to the economics of education by studying how access and school environments affect long-term outcomes. In one of his studies, Card used proximity to colleges as an instrumental variable. Results showed that people who lived closer to universities were more likely to enroll. Because of the additional years of schooling, this translated into higher earnings. Card's work helped prove that there are other factors that affect earnings and play a key role, like schooling. He also found that smaller class sizes, staff income, and resources can affect students' prospects, especially for those from disadvantaged backgrounds. His findings encouraged economists to consider how educational environments can affect inequality over time, and his studies helped broaden how economists think about education by highlighting the importance of real-world variation, institutional differences, and student experiences. His work played an important role in shifting the field toward a more careful empirical design and helped establish education as an area where credible causal evidence could be used to understand economic mobility and opportunity. These contributions were part of a broader empirical movement recognized when Card received the 2021 Nobel Memorial Prize in Economics Sciences.

== "Myth and Measurement: The New Economics of Minimum Wage" ==
=== Purpose ===
David Card and Alan B. Krueger utilized their work to challenge a widely held belief that a higher minimum wage would result in lower employment, a belief held by 90 percent of professional economists. They were dissatisfied with the existing approach that was used to evaluate minimum wage and employment, instead desiring natural experiments that would provide stronger evidence on the topic. Though a major purpose of the book was to showcase this misconception, perhaps an even greater purpose was present, through the usage of natural experiments the authors acted as a driving force in the establishment of empirical research to test the underlying economic model, furthering their purpose of further establishing economic research as a quantitative, research based field.

=== Conclusion & Implications ===
Myth and Measurement is a monumental economic work, which contains two primary conclusions, minimum wage does not necessarily adversely influence employment and a need to establish new models that are applied to the low-wage market. Throughout the work the usage of numerous samples of minimum wage changes, state and federal, demonstrates that there is no notable decrease in employment when the wage floor level is raised, as demonstrated through all data in the work indicating either an increase, no change, or insignificant decrease in employment. The final conclusion derives from the many anomalies present in minimum wage when evaluated under the standard market model, such as differences in wages amongst same skill workers, workers of varying ability receiving the same pay, the spillover effect, and minimum wage employers attracting more applicants than if minimum wage was not present, these conclusions suggest that the low-wage market does not fall into accordance with the standard labor model. The proposed alternative models place an emphasis on avoiding the problems of the standard labor market, these models are non-static, placing an emphasis on being dynamic. These models would not make the same unambiguous predictions and would allow for consideration of other wage setting factors, thus allowing for a more complete encasement of the low-wage market. Card describes two key implications of the work, policy and economic research implications. The first described implication of the work describes that there is too great of an emphasis placed on minimum wage policy, with those in opposition exaggerating the influence on employment and those in favor overemphasizing the effects on poverty. The focus of the policy debate, according to Card, should be the distributional effects of minimum wage, how minimum wage influences wage inequality, which the findings present suggest that it will counteract the growth experienced in the 1980s. Finally, Card believes that this work will greatly influence economic research in two manners, establishing prespecified conditions and the importance of firm-level microdata. Prespecified conditions will allow for broad agreement amongst researchers in regard to methodology, he believed that this work would allow for acceptance of this standard in economics. The value of firm-level microdata which would allow for a deeper understanding of factors that determine wages and alter the analysis of a variety of topics allowing for greater precision in data sets. Card concludes the work through emphasizing the importance of empirical research to create a more complete understanding of the low-wage market.

== Awards ==
He was the recipient of the 1995 John Bates Clark Medal, awarded to "that American economist under the age of forty who is judged to have made the most significant contribution to economic thought and knowledge" for his work related to the minimum wage as well as the economic effects of the Mariel boatlift. He gave the 2009 Richard T. Ely Lecture of the American Economic Association in San Francisco. A 2011 survey of economics professors named Card their fifth favorite living economist under the age of 60. Along with N. Gregory Mankiw, he was elected vice president of the American Economic Association for 2014.

He has received along with Richard Blundell the 2014 BBVA Foundation Frontiers of Knowledge Award in Economics, Finance and Management category for "their contributions to empirical microeconomics," in the words of the jury's citation. "Motivated by important empirical questions, they developed and estimated appropriate econometric models, making significant methodological contributions in the process. Both are known for their attention to institutional detail, careful and innovative research design, rigorous application of econometric tools, and dispassionate reporting of results."

Card was elected as a member of the U.S. National Academy of Sciences in 2021. He won the Nobel Memorial Prize in Economic Sciences in 2021 for research showing that an increase in minimum wage does not lead to less hiring, and immigrants do not lower pay for native-born workers.

== Publications ==
=== Books and Papers ===
- Card, David; Raphael, Steven, eds. (2013). Immigration, Poverty, and Socioeconomic Inequality. New York: Russell Sage Foundation. ISBN 978-0-87154-498-8.
- Card, David; Krueger, Alan B. (2011). Akee, Randall K. Q.; Zimmermann, Klaus F. (eds.). Wages, School Quality, and Employment Demand. IZA Prize in Labor Economics Series. Oxford: Oxford University Press. ISBN 978-0-19-969338-2.
- Ashenfelter, Orley; Card, David, eds. (2011). Handbook of Labor Economics. Vol. 4A. Amsterdam: Elsevier. ISBN 978-0-444-53450-7.
- Ashenfelter, Orley; Card, David, eds. (2011). Handbook of Labor Economics. Vol. 4B. Amsterdam: Elsevier. ISBN 978-0-444-53452-1.
- Auerbach, Alan J.; Card, David; Quigley, John M., eds. (2006). Poverty, The Distribution of Income, and Public Policy. New York: Russell Sage Foundation. ISBN 978-0-87154-046-1.
- Card, David; Blundell, Richard; Freeman, Richard B., eds. (2004). Seeking a Premier Economy: The Economic Effects of British Economic Reforms, 1980–2000. National Bureau of Economic Research Comparative Labor Markets Series. Chicago: University of Chicago Press. ISBN 978-0-226-09284-3.
- Card, David; Blank, Rebecca M., eds. (2000). Finding Jobs: Work and Welfare Reform. New York: Russell Sage Foundation. ISBN 978-0-87154-116-1.
- Ashenfelter, Orley C.; Card, David, eds. (1999). Handbook of Labor Economics. Vol. 3A. Amsterdam: Elsevier. ISBN 978-0-444-50187-5.
- Ashenfelter, Orley C.; Card, David, eds. (1999). Handbook of Labor Economics. Vol. 3B. Amsterdam: Elsevier. ISBN 978-0-444-50188-2.
- Ashenfelter, Orley C.; Card, David, eds. (1999). Handbook of Labor Economics. Vol. 3C. Amsterdam: Elsevier. ISBN 978-0-444-50189-9.
- Card, David; Krueger, Alan B. (1995). Myth and Measurement: The New Economics of the Minimum Wage (1st ed.). Princeton: Princeton University Press. ISBN 978-0-691-04390-6.
- Card, David; Peri, Giovanni. (2016). Immigration Economics: A Review. American Economic Association.
- Card, David; Devicienti, Francesco; Maida, Agata. (2013). Rent-sharing, Holdup, and Wages: Evidence from Matched Panel Data. The Review of Economic Studies. Vo. 81 (1).
- Card, David. (2011). Origins of the Unemployment Rate: The Lasting Legacy of Measurement without Theory. American Economic Review. Vo. 101 (3).
- Card, David; Dobkin, Carlos; Maestas, Nicole. (2008) The Impact of Nearly Universal Insurance Coverage on Health Care Utilization: Evidence from Medicare. American Economic Review. Vo. 98(5).

Card, David; Krueger, Alan B. (2016). Myth and Measurement: The New Economics of the Minimum Wage (Twentieth-Anniversary ed.). Princeton: Princeton University Press. ISBN 978-0-691-16912-5.

- Card, David; Freeman, Richard B., eds. (1993). Small Differences that Matter: Labor Markets and Income Maintenance in Canada and the United States. National Bureau of Economic Research Comparative Labor Markets Series. Chicago: University of Chicago Press. ISBN 978-0-226-09283-6.

Academic offices
Preceded by Janet Yellen	President of the American Economic Association; 2021–2022	Succeeded by Christina Romer
