= David Lee (economist) =

American economist

David S. Lee

Academic background
- Education: A.B. (1993), Harvard College; M.A. (1996), Ph.D. (1999), Princeton University
- Doctoral advisor: David Card

Academic work
- Discipline: Labor economics
- Institutions: Princeton University, University of California, Berkeley, Harvard University
- Website: https://www.princeton.edu/~davidlee/

David S. Lee is Chemical Bank Chairman's Professor of Economics and Public Affairs at Princeton University, founding director of Princeton's Initiative for Data Exploration and Analytics for Higher Education, and a Research Associate of the National Bureau of Economic Research. From 2013 to 2017, he was provost of Princeton, and from 2009 to 2013 he led Princeton's Industrial Relations Section. He co-edited The Review of Economics and Statistics from 2001 to 2013. He was a Sloan Research Fellow in 2006 and won the John T. Dunlop Outstanding Scholar Award of the Labor and Employment Relations Association in 2007.

== Selected works ==
- Lee, David S., and Thomas Lemieux. "Regression discontinuity designs in economics." Journal of economic literature 48, no. 2 (2010): 281–355.
- Lee, David S. "Randomized experiments from non-random selection in US House elections." Journal of Econometrics 142, no. 2 (2008): 675–697.
- Lee, David S. "Training, wages, and sample selection: Estimating sharp bounds on treatment effects." The Review of Economic Studies 76, no. 3 (2009): 1071–1102.
- Lee, David S. "Wage inequality in the United States during the 1980s: Rising dispersion or falling minimum wage?." The Quarterly Journal of Economics 114, no. 3 (1999): 977–1023.
- Lee, David S., and Alexandre Mas. "Long-run impacts of unions on firms: New evidence from financial markets, 1961–1999." The Quarterly Journal of Economics 127, no. 1 (2012): 333–378.
