= Baltic Development Forum =

Think tank for discussing topics related to countries of Baltic Sea Region

The Baltic Development Forum was an independent think-tank and non-profit high-level and agenda-setting networking organisation with strategic partners and sponsors from large companies, major cities, institutional investors, business associations and academia in the Baltic Sea Region. Founded in 1998, the network involved more than 8,000 decision-makers from all over the region and beyond.

== History ==
March 2014 former Minister for Foreign Affairs, Mrs. Lene Espersen replaced the interim Chairwoman, Mrs. Helle Bechgaard as chairwoman of Baltic Development Forum.

Until November 2011, Baltic Development Forum was chaired by Uffe Ellemann-Jensen, Minister for Foreign Affairs of Denmark 1982–1993. Mr. Ellemann-Jensen is co-founder of Baltic Development Forum (in 1998) and the Council of the Baltic Sea States (1992). Former CEO of Confederation of Danish Industry Hans Skov Christensen replaced Uffe Ellemann-Jensen as chairman. When Hans Skov Christensen died in autumn 2013 he was provisionally replaced by Member of the Board, Mrs. Helle Bechgaard.

The Baltic Development Forum Honorary Board and Advisory Board consist of high-level political dignitaries and prominent business executives and researchers representing the entire Baltic Sea Region. In June 2018, the Chairman of the BDF board, Lene Espersen, announced that the Baltic Development Forum would cease activities on the 31st July, 2018, following the BDF's 20th Summit in Tallinn.

== Mission ==
The mission of Baltic Development Forum was to promote the Baltic Sea Region as an integrated, prosperous and internationally competitive growth region, and to position the Baltic Sea Region in the EU and on the global map.

BDF undertook annual summits in almost every year it was operational for; between 1999 and 2018.

The BDF board suspended the Baltic Development Forum on the 31st July, 2018. In an statement issued a month before closure, the boards justification for cessation of activies was the majority of BDF's goals coming to fruition; "[the challenges to] exchange across-borders – politically, economically, and commercially – ...have been overcome or significantly reduced."

== Main activities ==
The Annual Summit takes place in different capitals and metropolis in the Baltic Sea Region - 1999: Copenhagen; 2000: Malmö; 2001: Copenhagen; 2002: St. Petersburg; 2003: Riga; 2004: Hamburg; 2005: Stockholm; 2006: Helsinki; 2007: Tallinn; 2008: Copenhagen/Malmö; 2009: Stockholm; 2010: Vilnius; 2011: Gdańsk; 2012: Copenhagen/Malmö; 2013: Riga. 2014: Turku, Finland.

The Baltic Development Forum's 'Baltic Sea Award' was established together with Swedbank as sponsor in 2007. Recipient of the Award was given to personalities that have made an extraordinary contribution to the future of the region.

Baltic Development Forum published annual reports reflecting their regional agenda for integration, innovation and sustainable growth. Baltic Development Forum also carried out different cooperation projects with partners from many parts of the region in the field of energy, water, investment promotion, transport, branding and ICT.

Baltic Development Forum has been a key supporter of the EU's adoption of an EU strategy for the Baltic Sea Region. In October 2009, the European Council of the EU endorsed the first EU strategy for a macro-regional area of the EU. The Baltic Sea Region thereby has the chance to make an innovative combination of European and regional integration and news efforts to improve territorial cohesion of the EU according to EU's Strategy for the Baltic Sea Region.

In 2014, BDF launched a sub-think tank Top of Digital Europe, in partnership with Microsoft. Top of Digital Europe performed policy research and conduced cross-border dialogue on the role of ICT within the Baltic Sea Reigon. Top of Digital Europe published analyses -- State of the Digital Region -- of the digital economies within Baltic countries. The last publication before BDF and TDE were both dissolved was in November 2017.

== The History of the Region ==
The Baltic Sea Region comprises 11 nations and more than 100 million inhabitants. The Baltic Development Forum defined the Baltic Sea Region as including the Baltic countries Estonia, Latvia and Lithuania, the Nordic countries of Denmark, Finland, Iceland, Norway and Sweden, Northern Germany (Hansestadt Hamburg, Mecklenburg-Vorpommern and Schleswig-Holstein), Northern Poland (Pomorskie, Warminsko-Mazurskie and Zachodnio-Pomorskie), and parts of Russia's Northwestern region. Kaliningrad was not included in 2006, but was later.

The region shares many historical ties, which often are symbolized by the legacy of the Hanse around the Baltic Sea. Thus, the Baltic Sea has been the facilitator of integrative processes in more than 1000 years with more intensive periods than other. Naturally, the Cold War to a large extent hindered extended cooperation, but when the Berlin Wall fell in 1989 new strong ties emerged. Nowadays the Baltic Sea Region is interlaced by a myriad of formal and informal cross-border organisations and fora signalising the multidimensional scale of interaction.
