= Uffe Ellemann-Jensen =

Danish politician (1941–2022)

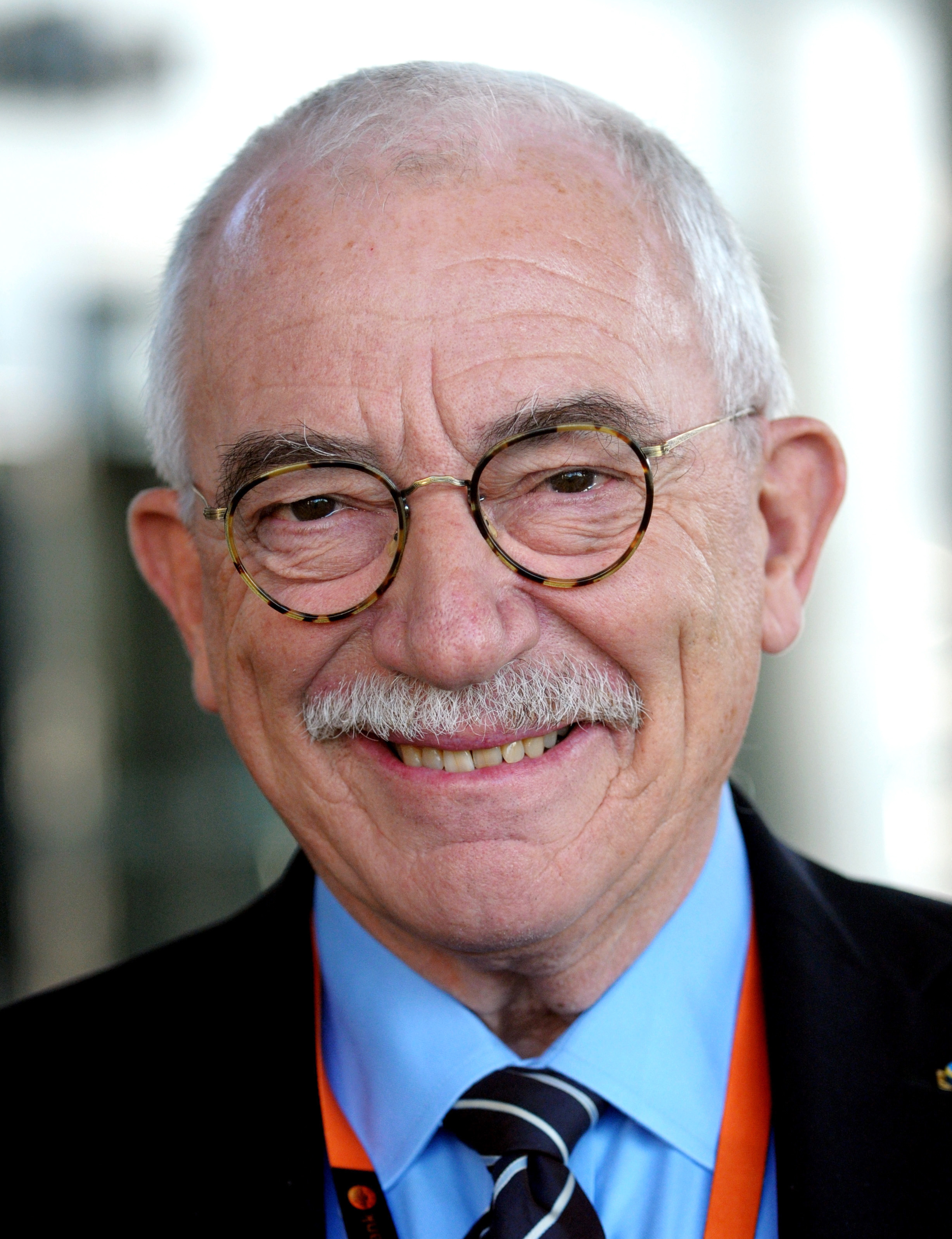
- Elleman-Jensen in 2009

Minister of Foreign Affairs
- In office 10 September 1982 – 25 January 1993
- Prime Minister: Poul Schlüter
- Preceded by: Kjeld Olesen
- Succeeded by: Niels Helveg Petersen

Leader of Venstre
- In office 23 July 1984 – 18 March 1998
- Preceded by: Henning Christophersen
- Succeeded by: Anders Fogh Rasmussen

President of the European Liberals
- In office 1995–2000
- Preceded by: Willy De Clercq
- Succeeded by: Werner Hoyer

Personal details
- Born: 1 November 1941 Haarby, Denmark
- Died: 18 June 2022 (aged 80) Copenhagen, Denmark
- Party: Venstre
- Spouses: Hanne Jonsen (m. 1963–1971) Alice Vestergaard (m. 1971)
- Children: 4 incl.: Karen Ellemann; Jakob Ellemann-Jensen

Uffe Ellemann-Jensen (Danish pronunciation: [ˈufə ˈeləmæn ˈjensn̩, - ˈeləˌmænˀ -]; 1 November 1941 – 18 June 2022) was a Danish politician who served as Minister for Foreign Affairs of Denmark in the Conservative-led Poul Schlüter Administration from 1982 to 1993. He was leader of the Danish Liberal Party Venstre from 1984 to 1998 and President of the European Liberals 1995–2000.

In 1998 Ellemann-Jensen founded Baltic Development Forum, a non-profit networking organisation dedicated to the business development of the Baltic Sea region. He was its first chairman from its founding to 2011, and was also honorary chairman following his resignation. He was also non-executive director of various boards of international companies.

== Political career ==
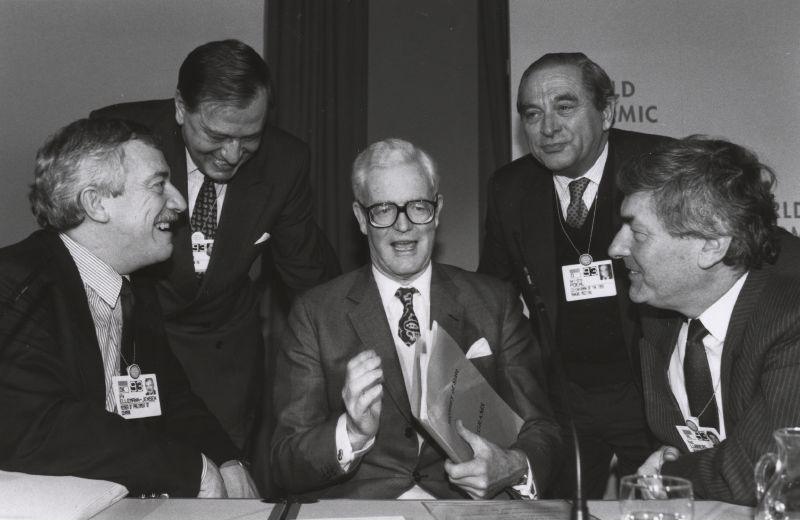
World Economic Forum Annual Meeting 1993. From left to right: Ellemann-Jensen, Karl Otto Pöhl, Ruud Lubbers.

A strong supporter of NATO and the European Union based upon his belief in Western cohesion, Ellemann-Jensen's stance led to many political battles with the left-wing opposition. Several times the opposition tried to topple him on issues of solidarity within NATO, but he survived. Uffe Ellemann-Jensen succeeded in convincing a majority in the Danish Parliament, the Folketinget, to actively support the U.S. led coalition against Iraq during the Gulf War. Furthermore, he led the Danish recognition of the renewed independence of the three Baltic countries in 1991, when Denmark was the first country to re-establish diplomatic relations with the three countries. In 1992, Ellemann-Jensen, together with his German colleague Hans-Dietrich Genscher, took the initiative to create the Council of the Baltic Sea States (CBSS) and the EuroFaculty.

In September 1992, Ellemann-Jensen and other senior officials visited southern Somalia, one of the first foreign delegations to do so since the start of civil war there the year before.

After the fall of the centre-right government, in which he also served as Deputy Prime Minister, in 1993 following the Tamil case, outgoing prime minister Poul Schlüter attempted to have Ellemann-Jensen appointed acting prime minister until Henning Dyremose (Conservative) could take over, but the attempt was dropped as royal cabinet secretary Niels Eilschou Holm considered the maneuver unconstitutional. Instead, Poul Nyrup Rasmussen (Social Democrats) was appointed prime minister following a "Queen's round", and Ellemann-Jensen became leader of the opposition.

Ellemann-Jensen was leader of the opposition until the 1998 general election, which he lost with a single seat. If his party had only 85 more votes, he would have been able to form a new centre-right government as Prime Minister. He decided then to leave politics and his successor as the leader of Venstre was Anders Fogh Rasmussen, who became Prime Minister of Denmark in 2001.

The new active Danish foreign policy continued after Ellemann-Jensen's ten-year term as Foreign Minister and ultimately became a turning point in Danish foreign and defence policy. It later became known as the Ellemann-Jensen doctrine.

In 1995, Ellemann-Jensen was a candidate for the post of Secretary-General of NATO when Willy Claes was forced to leave the role. He got the support of the U.S. government, but France blocked his candidature, preferring the Spanish candidate, Javier Solana. Ellemann-Jensen never tried to hide his disappointment with not getting the post that he had wanted all his political life.

He participated eight times in the Bilderberg conferences: 1984, 1987 and every year between 1993 and 1998.

After leaving politics, Ellemann-Jensen became a columnist for the Danish daily Berlingske Tidende and a contributor to Project Syndicate.

Ellemann-Jensen became a central figure in the controversy following the Danish daily Jyllands-Posten's decision to print 12 satirical images of the Islamic prophet Muhammad in September 2005. In his column, only days after the cartoons were printed, he argued that he thought the cartoons represented an "unnecessary provocation", believing they constituted in themselves a caricature of Denmark's "cherished freedom of expression". Ellemann-Jensen remained in that position all through the controversy at the same time never missing an opportunity to support the Danish Prime Minister's stance that the government could not and should not take punitive action against the newspaper.

== Personal life ==
Uffe Ellemann-Jensen was the son of Jens Peter Jensen a member of the Folketing. In 1971, his first marriage was dissolved and he married Alice Vestergaard. He had four children, among them Jakob Ellemann-Jensen and Karen Ellemann. He was an avid hunter and fly fisher.

== Awards ==
In 1997, the President of the Republic of Estonia, Lennart Meri, awarded Elleman-Jensen the Order of the Cross of Terra Mariana, First Class. In 1996, he was conferred the title of the Honorary Fellow of the University of Tartu.

On 18 December 2002, Ellemann-Jensen was awarded the Grand Cross of the Order of Dannebrog.

On 12 February 2010, Ellemann-Jensen received the highest accolade of the Republic of Macedonia, the Order 8-September for his contribution to the strengthening of Danish-Macedonian relations and for promotion of Macedonia in its initial years of independence in the early 1990s.

== Illnesses and death ==
In 1989, Ellemann-Jensen underwent surgery for two spinal disc herniations in his neck, but experienced two cervical fractures of his spine during the operation; subsequently, he wore a neck brace for half a year. He had a stent inserted in his heart and, following a blood clot, a pacemaker. He had another blood clot in an IC3 train to Aalborg in 2003, after which he stopped smoking. He furthermore had diabetes. He had a tumor that pressed against his spinal cord removed in 2019. In a 2021 interview with Ellemann-Jensen, it was reported that an "old cancer [...] was stirring again", (Note: Original quote: "[...] en gammel kræftsygdom, som er begyndt at røre på sig igen.") and referring to his health problems, he stated that he was "a wandering example of medical science's progress". (Note: Original quote: "Jeg er et omvandrende eksempel på lægekunstens fremdrift.")

In August 2021, the then–fully vaccinated Ellemann-Jensen was admitted to hospital with COVID-19 for three weeks; he was then in further treatment for two weeks. Ellemann-Jensen had a successful prostate cancer surgery at an apparently early stage of the disease in January 2011. Subsequently, however, the cancer flared up again, and on 13 June 2022 he was admitted to Rigshospitalet, where he died on 18 June at the age of 80.

== Bibliography ==
- De nye millionærer (The new millionaires), 1971
- Det afhængige samfund (The dependent society), 1972
- Hvad gør vi ved Gudenåen? (What should we do about Gudenåen), 1973
- Den truede velstand (The threatened wealth), 1974
- Økonomi (Economy), 1975
- Da Danmark igen sagde ja til det fælles (When Denmark once more said yes to the common), 1987
- Et lille land, og dog (A small country, or perhaps not), 1991
- Olfert Fischer i Golfen (Olfert Fischer in the Gulf), 1991, with Sv. E. Thiede
- Din egen dag er kort (Your own day is short), 1996
- Rent ud sagt – indfald og udfald (Plainly spoken – ideas and attacks), 1997
- Sådan set (In a manner of speaking), 1997 with Erik Werner
- EU – derfor (EU – the reason), 1998
- Ude med snøren (Having the fishing line out), 2001
- Østen for solen (East of the sun), 2002
- FODfejl (Stepping in it), 2004
- Ude med snøren – fisk og mennesker jeg har mødt, 2004, ISBN 87-00-49716-9, autobiography featuring recreational fishing
- Vejen, jeg valgte, 2009, ISBN 87-03-02892-5
- Nu gik det lige så godt, men så gik verden af lave, 2009, ISBN 87-02-08088-5, about the effects of the 2008 financial crisis

Political offices
Preceded by Kjeld Olesen	Foreign Minister of Denmark; 10 September 1982 – 25 January 1993	Succeeded by Niels Helveg Petersen
Party political offices
Preceded by Henning Christophersen	Leader of Venstre; 1984–1998	Succeeded by Anders Fogh Rasmussen
