= John M. Abowd =

American economist, Cornell University

John Abowd
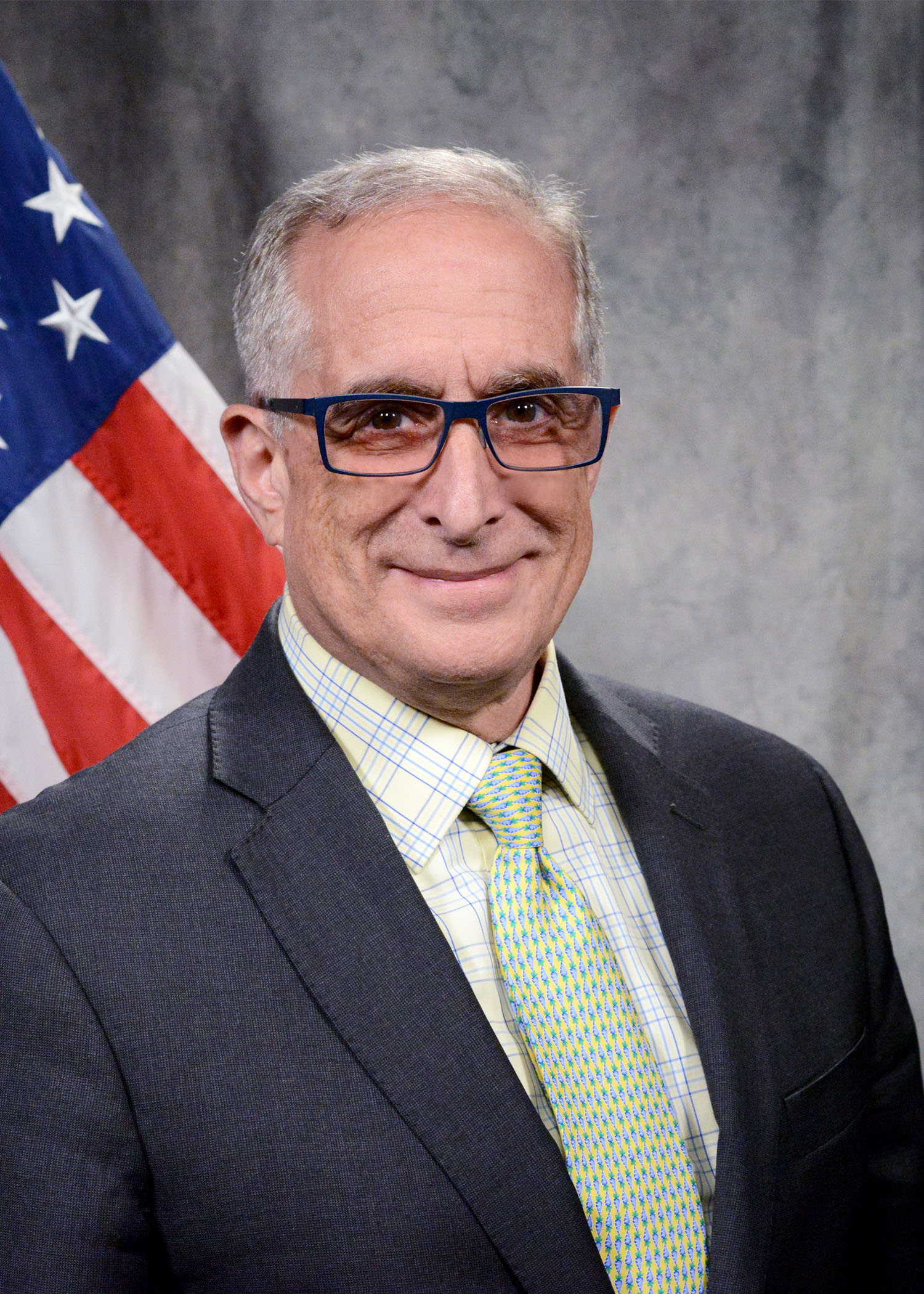
- Born: December 22, 1951 (age 74)
- Education: University of Notre Dame (BA); University of Chicago (MA, PhD)
- Relatives: Gregory Abowd
- Scientific career
- Fields: Statistics; Econometrics; Labour economics
- Workplaces: Cornell University
- Doctoral advisor: Arnold Zellner

John Maron Abowd (born December 22, 1951) is an American economist who has served as the Edmund Ezra Day Professor Emeritus of Economics, Statistics, and Data Science since 2021. From 2016 to 2022, he served as Associate Director for Research and Methodology and Chief Scientist at the United States Census Bureau. He is currently a standing member of the Technical Committee in United States of America et al. v. Google LLC (Civil Action No. 20-3010 (APM)) and State of Colorado et al. v. Google LLC (Civil Action No. 20-3715 (APM)), appointed on January 21, 2026 pursuant to the Final Judgment.

At Cornell, Abowd has taught and conducted research since 1987, including seven years on the faculty of the Johnson Graduate School of Management. Abowd is best known for his contributions in the field of labor economics, and in particular his work in creating, disseminating, and using longitudinal employee-employer matched data.

== Biography ==
Abowd grew up in Michigan as the oldest of 12 siblings. His father was an automotive engineer and his mother was a homemaker. The family moved from Detroit to the suburb of Farmington when Abowd was in the third grade. He attended a small Catholic parish high school and participated in high school debate. Abowd's family had a strong connection to the University of Notre Dame. He and eight of his siblings eventually graduated from the university, and his father was also a Notre Dame alumnus.

== Career ==
Abowd received a BA in economics (with highest honors) from the University of Notre Dame in 1973 and a PhD in economics from the University of Chicago in 1977, under supervision of Arnold Zellner.

Prior to arriving at Cornell University in 1987, Abowd served on the faculty at Princeton University, the University of Chicago, and the Massachusetts Institute of Technology.

In addition to his professorship at Cornell University, Abowd is currently a research associate at the National Bureau of Economic Research (NBER), a research fellow at RF Berlin, and a research fellow at the Institute for the Study of Labor (IZA). Abowd was the founding director of the Labor Dynamics Institute (LDI) at Cornell from 2011 to 2020. In 2014, he was elected a Fellow of the Econometric Society.

Abowd served as President of the Society of Labor Economists in 2014. He was chair in 2013 for the Business and Economic Statistics Section and fellow of the American Statistical Association. He is an elected member of the International Statistical Institute (2012). Abowd served as a distinguished senior research fellow at the United States Census Bureau from 1998 to 2015. He also served on the National Academies' Committee on National Statistics from 2010 to 2013 and as director of the Cornell Institute for Social and Economic Research (CISER) from 1999 to 2007.

From June 2016 until October 2022, Abowd served as Associate Director for Research and Methodology and Chief Scientist at the United States Census Bureau. He continued as an executive senior advisor for Research and Methodology until July 2023. During his tenure, he led the Census Bureau's research and methodology directorate and played a major role in the development and implementation of the disclosure avoidance system for the 2020 United States census of population and housing.

Abowd has been the principal investigator or co-principal investigator for multiyear grants and contracts from the National Science Foundation, the U.S. Census Bureau, the National Institute on Aging, and the Alfred P. Sloan Foundation.

Abowd, along with John Haltiwanger and Julia Lane, received the 2014 Roger Herriot Award from the American Statistical Association for work improving federal data collection, and in particular work developing and disseminating employee-employer matched data through the Census Bureau's LEHD Program.

In 2024, Abowd became a founding member and president of the Society for Privacy and Confidentiality Research, an organization established to provide a sustainable organizational and financial structure for the Journal of Privacy and Confidentiality.

== Research ==
Abowd's current research focuses on the creation, dissemination, privacy protection, and use of matched longitudinal data on employers and employees. Abowd helped to found and provided scientific leadership for the U.S. Census Bureau's Longitudinal Employer-Household Dynamics Program, which integrates censuses, demographic surveys, economic surveys, and administrative data to produce research and public-use data.

Abowd's other research interests include network models for integrated labor market data; statistical methods for confidentiality protection of microdata, including the creation of synthetic data; international comparisons of labor market outcomes; executive compensation; bargaining and other wage-setting institutions; and the econometric tools of labor market analysis.

His work has included the development and evaluation of differential privacy methods for official statistics, including research on the 2020 Census Disclosure Avoidance System.

In 2025, Abowd co-authored research examining the possibility of reconstructing and reidentifying individual records from the 2010 U.S. Census. The study investigated the risks associated with releasing detailed statistical tabulations and the implications for statistical disclosure limitation.

=== Major contributions to economics ===
Abowd’s work has appeared in the American Economic Review, Econometrica, the Review of Economics and Statistics, the Quarterly Journal of Economics, the Journal of the American Statistical Association, the Journal of Business and Economic Statistics, the Journal of Econometrics, and other major economics and statistics journals.

Among Abowd's most influential articles was "High Wage Workers and High Wage Firms", in which Abowd, Francis Kramarz, and David Margolis used a matched sample of French employees and employers to decompose annual compensation into components related to observable employee characteristics, personal heterogeneity, firm heterogeneity, and residual variation. Their econometric approach, now widely referred to as the "AKM decomposition," laid the groundwork for a large body of subsequent research using employee-employer linked data in labor economics to understand topics including inter-industry wage differentials, firm size-wage effects, and job search and matching in the labor market.

In other widely cited work with David Card, Abowd used longitudinal data to analyze changes in individual earnings and hours over time. Abowd and Card explored the covariance structure of earnings and hours and interpreted them in the context of a life-cycle model of labor supply.

== Awards and honors ==
In 2016, Abowd received the Julius Shiskin Award from the American Statistical Association's Business and Economic Statistics Section, the National Association for Business Economics, and the Washington Statistical Society. In 2020, he was elected a Fellow of the American Association for the Advancement of Science for contributions to the statistical understanding of U.S. population dynamics.

Abowd became the inaugural recipient of the Edward Lazear Prize from the Society of Labor Economists in 2022. That same year, Abowd also received a Champion of Freedom Award from the Electronic Privacy Information Center for his role in transforming the Census Bureau’s disclosure avoidance system through the introduction of differential privacy.

In 2023, Abowd and colleagues received the Casper Bowden Award for Outstanding Research in Privacy Enhancing Technologies for their paper "The 2020 Census Disclosure Avoidance System TopDown Algorithm." In 2023, Abowd and Simson Garfinkel received an IEEE Cybersecurity Award for Practice for their contributions to the privacy-preserving distribution of U.S. Census data. In 2023, Abowd was named the recipient of the ACM Policy Award for transformative work in modernizing the U.S. Census Bureau's processing and dissemination of census and survey data while enhancing privacy.

Abowd was also part of the Census Bureau's Disclosure Avoidance System team that received the U.S. Department of Commerce Gold Medal for Scientific/Engineering Achievement for designing and implementing confidentiality protections for 2020 Census redistricting data.

In 2024, Abowd received the ACM Policy Award at a ceremony in San Francisco.

In 2026, Abowd and fourteen co-authors including his Cornell colleague, Lars Vilhuber, received the Casper Bowden PET Award for Outstanding Research in Privacy Enhancing Technologies for their paper "A Simulated Reconstruction and Reidentification Attack on the 2010 U.S. Census." Abowd had previously received the award in 2023.
