= Ethan G. Lewis =

Labor economist

Ethan Lewis

Academic background
- Alma mater: UC Berkeley; Williams College

Academic work
- Discipline: Labour Economics; Econometrics
- Institutions: Dartmouth College, Associate Professor of Economics
- Website: https://www.dartmouth.edu/~ethang/; Information at IDEAS / RePEc

Ethan Lewis is a labor economist and Professor of Economics at Dartmouth College. His fields of specialization are labor economics and econometrics with a specific interest in how U.S. labor markets have adapted to immigration and technological change.

Prior to Dartmouth, Lewis was a visiting scholar at the Federal Reserve Bank of San Francisco and an economist in the Research Department of the Federal Reserve Bank of Philadelphia.

== Education ==
Lewis earned his Ph.D. in Economics from UC Berkeley in 2003. He graduated magna cum laude and Phi Beta Kappa with a B.A. in Economics from Williams College in 1995.

== Research ==
Lewis' research has been mentioned in the press numerous times by outlets such as The New York Times , The Wall Street Journal, The Economist, NPR, and C-SPAN.

In recent work, he has studied how immigration waves advanced the Second Industrial Revolution and a study of how manufacturing firms adapt production technology to employ less-skilled immigrants. He has also studied how native-born families react to increasing enrollments of immigrant children in public schools.

=== Selected works ===
- Ethan Lewis. "Immigration, skill mix, and capital skill complementarity." The Quarterly Journal of Economics 126 (2), 1029-1069
- P Beaudry, M Doms, E Lewis. "Should the personal computer be considered a technological revolution? Evidence from US metropolitan areas." Journal of Political Economy 118 (5), 988-1036
- E Cascio, N Gordon, E Lewis, S Reber. "Paying for progress: Conditional grants and the desegregation of southern schools." The Quarterly Journal of Economics 125 (1), 445-482
- P Beaudry, E Lewis. "Do male-female wage differentials reflect differences in the return to skill? Cross-city evidence from 1980-2000." American Economic Journal: Applied Economics 6 (2), 178-94

== Professional activities ==
Lewis is a research associate of the National Bureau of Economic Research and the Center for Research and Analysis of Migration. He serves on the Board of Editors for the American Economic Journal: Applied Economics and the journal for Regional Science and Urban Economics.

== Personal ==
Ethan Lewis is married to Elizabeth Cascio, who is also a professor of economics at Dartmouth. They live in Hanover, New Hampshire with their two children.
