= Caroline Y. Robertson-von Trotha =

Scottish sociologist and cultural scientist

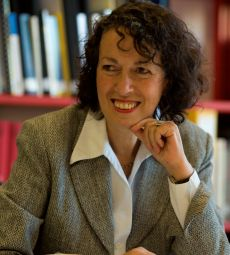
Caroline Y. Robertson-von Trotha

Caroline Y. Robertson-von Trotha (born 22 February 1951 in Glasgow, Scotland) is a Scottish sociologist and cultural scientist, working in Germany.

== Biography and career ==
After the unexpected death of her father, Caroline Robertson left Oban High School at the age of 15 without School Leaving Qualifications. In 1967 she completed her basic training in hotel management ('City & Guild-Certificate') and was awarded with the gold medal of the Oban Hotel Association.

After having worked in the hotel industry/sector for two years, Robertson-von Trotha began a journey as a backpacker through Europe and Turkey, which took her finally to Germany. Here she prepared herself autodidactically for the Scottish Higher Level Examinations. In 1972 she was accepted by the University of Heidelberg and studied political science, sociology, philosophy and history in Heidelberg and Karlsruhe. With the support of a grant from the Peter Fuld Foundation, she received her PhD in 1990 after completing a dissertation on the topic 'Ethnic Identity and Political Mobilisation'.

In 2004 she habilitated on 'The Dialectics of Globalisation' at the Faculty of Humanities and Social Sciences at the University of Karlsruhe. In 2007 she was appointed as an adjunct professor by the rector of the Karlsruhe Institute of Technology (KIT), formerly University of Karlsruhe (TH).

She was a founding member of the Interfacultative Institute for Cultural Studies (IAK) at the University of Karlsruhe (TH), and from 1990 to 2002 served as its managing director. Since 2002, she has been founding scientific director of the successor institution, the ZAK | Centre for Cultural and General Studies at the Karlsruhe Institute of Technology (KIT).

She is married to Klaus von Trotha, who was Minister of Science, Research and the Arts of Baden-Württemberg from 1991 to 2001.

== Research ==
Robertson-von Trotha's research focuses on globalisation and cultural change, multiculturalism and integration policy, cultural heritage, and the 'Theory and Practice of Public Science' (Öffentliche Wissenschaft). In her opening speeches to the 'Karlsruher Dialogues' Robertson-von Trotha introduced the concept of Public Science, redesigning the classical task of science communication and dissemination of scientific processes and findings according to dialogical and transdisciplinary principles. She was the first to introduce the term in German speaking space, as well as an advising expert and one of the first signatories of the Charta Öffentliche Kommunikationswissenschaft ('Public Communication Science'). This approach had been inspired by the tradition of the British 'PUS Initiative' ('Public Understanding of Science') and the promotion of the 'Understanding of Scientific literacy' developed in North America. Subsequently, Robertson-von Trotha developed her concept in relation to the PUSH-Memorandum of the non-profit company Wissenschaft im Dialog (WiD), founded in 1999, an initiative of the Stifterverband für die Deutsche Wissenschaft ('Donors' Association for the Promotion of Sciences and Humanities in Germany'), and in 2012 she carried out the first of several analyses of Public Science "in the mirror of Web 2.0 culture". As founding director of the ZAK | Centre for Cultural and General Studies, she also institutionally established her programme of 'Public Science in Theory and Practice': in addition to Research and Teaching, it forms one of the three pillars on which the centre is based on.

== Fields of activity ==
Caroline Y. Robertson-von Trotha's multifaceted commitment is characterized by a combination of theoretical and practical approaches. One of her central issues is the mediation between science and society, with a focus on international and intercultural contexts, interdisciplinarity, and critical reflection.

=== Conceptual activity ===
She developed her core concept, 'Public Science' (ÖW), within the framework of the Interfacultative Institute for Cultural Studies (IAK), which she had co-founded in 1989. The main aim was to raise public awareness of the importance of science and thus enable an exchange in the sense of an encompassing civil society. Key conceptual terms include 'Scientific/Cultural Literacy' and 'Scientist Citizen/Citizen Scientist'. In the process, especially later on as founding director of the ZAK, she conceived various and diverse formats which represent possibilities for practical implementation of her theory of 'Public Science': Following the 'Karlsruhe Dialogues' (since 1997), these are above all the further development of the 'Colloquium Fundamentale' (since winter semester 2002/2003), the 'Jean Monnet Keynote Lectures' (since summer semester 2008), the 'City Conversations' (since 2015) and, since winter semester 2016/2017, the 'Science Dialogues' and the 'World Science Café'.

Analogous to her integrative approach in the field of science communication, Robertson-von Trotha researches and is involved in the field of socio-political integration. In her early publications in the late 1980s and early 1990s, she developed themes and theses on multiculturalism and integration which have become increasingly important for research and politics since the turn of the millennium. In her dissertation of 1991, for example, she describes in detail how ethnic identity can be used for mobilization for various political goals and the dangers this entails. At first it is the German sociologist and political scientist Alf Mintzel, for example, who recognizes Robertson-von Trotha's work as a contribution to research on ethnic identities as a "central theorem". Accordingly, in 2011, she was significantly involved as scientific consultant and co-author in drafting the strategy paper 'Alliance for Integration' of the Stuttgart City Council, which was awarded the Cities for Peace Prize by UNESCO in 2004; and in 2016 she introduced in cooperation with the International Scholars & Welcome Office (IScO) at KIT and within the framework of the Philipp Schwartz Initiative, supported by the German Federal Foreign Office and others, the 'World Science Café', where refugees report on their scientific work.

=== Curatorial and editorial activities ===
In addition to curating her own format concepts such as the 'Karlsruhe Dialogues', since 2012, Robertson-von Trotha is currently responsible for the coordination of the German network of the Anna Lindh Foundation (Anna Lindh Euro-Mediterranean Foundation for the Dialogue Between Cultures). She has been head of various research projects, including the DFG project 'InsideScience – Public Science in Collaborative Research Projects' (2010-2012) and 'The Interdisciplinary Centre for Digital Tradition' (CODIGT) (2011-2016).

Robertson-von Trotha is the editor of three scientific series: 'Kulturwissenschaft interdisziplinär/Interdisciplinary Studies on Culture and Society' (published by Nomos in Baden-Baden), Problemkreise der Angewandten Kulturwissenschaft, and Kulturelle Überlieferung – digital (published by KIT Scientific Publishing in Karlsruhe).

=== Offices and memberships ===
Caroline Y. Robertson-von Trotha holds several offices and is a member of various boards of trustees and committees: Since 2009, she is a member of the Culture Committee of the German UNESCO Commission (from 2009 until 2011 Vice-Chairwoman), since 2011, Deputy Chairwoman of the Humboldt Regional Group Karlsruhe-Pforzheim e.V. and since 2013, chairwoman of the Academic Council for Culture and Foreign Policy (WIKA) at the Institute for Foreign Cultural Relations (ifa) in Stuttgart/Berlin, where she is also a member of the Research Advisory Board. Since 2014, she is a member of the Scientific Committee of the Anna Lindh Foundation Report. In addition, she was active for/within the KIT as spokesperson in several KIT competence areas, like Mensch und Technik ('People and Technology'), Technik, Kultur und Gesellschaft ('Technology, Culture and Society'), and Kulturerbe und sozialer Wandel ('Cultural Heritage and Social Change').

Since 1995, she is a member of the Board of Trustees of the Institute for Cultural Policy of the Kulturpolitische Gesellschaft e.V., as well as founding member of the Kulturwissenschaftliche Gesellschaft e.V. (2015); since 2017, she is member of the Scientific Advisory Board (Kleines Konvent) of the Schader Foundation and member of the Netzwerk Integrationsforschung ('Network Integration Research') of the Baden-Württemberg Ministry for Integration.

She was also appointed to the impromptu EU Focus Working Group on Science and Culture in 2009, and is also a reviewer for the EU, the MWK (Ministry of Science, Research and the Arts of Baden-Württemberg) and the BMBF (Federal Ministry of Education and Research).

June 2021: Caroline Y. Robertson-von Trotha was set ex-aequo on the short list of two in the final round of the selection process for the next Executive Director of the 42 member state Anna Lindh Euro-Mediterranean Foundation for the Dialogue Between Cultures.

== List of works ==
=== Books ===
- Dialektik der Globalisierung. Kulturelle Nivellierung bei gleichzeitiger Verstärkung kultureller Differenz, Karlsruhe 2009, ISBN 978-3-86644-359-4
- Ethnische Identität und politische Mobilisation. Das Beispiel Schottland, Baden-Baden 1991, ISBN 978-3-7890-2540-2

=== Scientific articles ===
- with Marlis Prinzing: Öffentliche Medien- und Kommunikationswissenschaft als Public Service : Anregungen zu einer notwendigen Debatte. In: MedienJournal - Zeitschrift für Medien- und Kommunikationsforschung, Jg. 49 (2025) H. 2. Öffentliche, Transdisziplinäre und Transformative Medien- und Kommunikationswissenschaft, Jahrgang 49 (2025), Heft 2, S. 39–58, Klagenfurt: Österreichischen Gesellschaft für Kommunikationswissenschaft (ÖGK), 2025. DOI: 10.60764/1025-9473.2025.02.3
- Öffentliche Wissenschaft im Spiegel der Web 2.0-Kultur, in: ibid./Jesús Muñoz Morcillo (eds.): Öffentliche Wissenschaft und Neue Medien. Die Rolle der Web 2.0-Kultur in der Wissenschaftsvermittlung, Karlsruhe 2012, pp. 19–35, ISBN 978-3-86644-844-5
- Rechtsextremismus in Deutschland und Europa. Einleitende Anmerkungen, in: ibid. (ed.): Rechtsextremismus in Deutschland und Europa. Rechts außen – Rechts ‚Mitte‘? (= Kulturwissenschaft interdisziplinär, Vol. 7), Karlsruhe 2011, pp. 11–18, ISBN 978-3-8329-5817-6
- Europe: Insights from the Outside. An Introduction, in: ibid. (ed.): Europe: Insights from the Outside (= Kulturwissenschaft interdisziplinär/Interdisciplinary Studies on Culture and Society, Vol. 5), Karlsruhe 2011, pp. 9–17, ISBN 978-3-8329-5583-0
- Cultural Heritage: Dilemmas of Preservation in the Midst of Change, in: Oliver Parodi/Ingacio Ayestaran/Gerhard Banse (eds.): Sustainable Development – Relationships to Culture, Knowledge and Ethics (= Karlsruher Studien Technik und Kultur, Vol. 3), Karlsruhe 2011, pp. 175–186, ISBN 978-3-86644-627-4
- Kulturerbe – Dilemmata des Bewahrens im Wandel, in: Oliver Parodi/Gerhard Banse/Axel Schaffer (eds.): Wechselspiele: Kultur und Nachhaltigkeit. Annäherungen an ein Spannungsfeld, Berlin 2010, pp. 263–274, ISBN 978-3-89404-585-2
- Ist der Tod bloß der Tod? Tod und Sterben in der Gegenwartsgesellschaft – ein thematischer Umriss, in: Schulmagazin 5–10, 11, 2009, pp. 7–9, ISSN 0947-2746
- Schlüsselqualifikationen revisited. Ein altes Thema in Zukunftskontexten, in: ibid. (ed.): Schlüsselqualifikationen für Studium, Beruf und Gesellschaft (= Problemkreise der Angewandten Kulturwissenschaft, Vol. 14), Karlsruhe 2009, pp. 17–58, ISBN 978-3-86644-375-4

=== Editor ===
- Celebrity Culture. Stars in der Mediengesellschaft (= Kulturwissenschaft interdisziplinär, Vol. 9), Baden-Baden 2013, ISBN 978-3-8329-6998-1
- Organised Crime. Dark Sides of Globalisation (= Kulturwissenschaft interdisziplinär/Interdisciplinary Studies on Culture and Society, Vol. 8), Baden-Baden 2012, ISBN 978-3-8329-5818-3
- (with Jesús Muñoz Morcillo): Öffentliche Wissenschaft und Neue Medien. Die Rolle der Web 2.0-Kultur in der Wissenschaftsvermittlung, Karlsruhe 2012, ISBN 978-3-86644-844-5
- (with Robert Hauser): Neues Erbe. Aspekte, Perspektiven und Konsequenzen der digitalen Überlieferung (Kulturelle Überlieferung – digital 1), Karlsruhe 2011, ISBN 978-3-86644-737-0
- Rechtsextremismus in Deutschland und Europa. Rechts außen – Rechts ‚Mitte‘? (= Kulturwissenschaft interdisziplinär, Vol. 7), Karlsruhe 2011, ISBN 978-3-8329-5817-6
- 60 Jahre Studium Generale und 20 Jahre Angewandte Kulturwissenschaft an der Universität Karlsruhe (TH), Karlsruhe 2009, ISBN 978-3-86644-439-3
- Tod und Sterben in der Gegenwartsgesellschaft. Eine interdisziplinäre Auseinandersetzung (= Kulturwissenschaft interdisziplinär, Vol. 3), Baden-Baden 2008, ISBN 978-3-8329-3171-1
- Die Dialektik der Globalisierung. Kulturelle Nivellierung bei gleichzeitiger Verstärkung kultureller Differenz, Karlsruhe 2009, ISBN 978-3-8329-3171-1
