= Bibliodiversity =

Variety of book culture

Bibliodiversity is the cultural diversity applied to the writing and publishing world. Probably born in Latin America, the concept spread broadly in the Spanish and French world during the 1990s. The term is now used frequently by independent publishers, authors and NGOs defending and promoting cultural diversity. "Bibliodiversity" is also the name of an academic journal. The day of 21 September was declared by independent publishers "the Bibliodiversity Day".

== The concept – origin and dissemination ==
Exactly who first coined the term bibliodiversidad remains unclear. Yet it seems beyond doubt that the word was used in Spanish first of all. Authorship has been claimed by a group of Chilean publishers who say they used it when founding the Editores independientes de Chile collective in the late 1990s. Publisher RIL Editores (www.rileditores.com) supposedly played a key role in coining the term. This claim to paternity has sometimes been disputed by Spanish publishers, however – in particular by some members of the Madrid group "Bibliodiversidad", who claim the term as their own creation. To date neither of these two hypotheses has been supported by any printed documentation clearly authenticated by publication date.

In 1999, the directors of “Bibliothèque Interculturelle pour le Futur” ('intercultural library for the future') – a programme established by the Charles Léopold Mayer Foundation. and led by Michel Sauquet and Étienne Galliand – co-organised a meeting at Gijón in Spain. This is when they encountered the term, in Spanish, for the first time.

May 2002 saw the creation of the International Alliance of Independent Publishers and the word was used by the organisation's founders.

From this point onwards the International Alliance of Independent Publishers has made a major contribution to disseminating and promoting this term in various languages, especially at its international meetings (sources available for consultation: the Declarations from Dakar in 2003, Guadalajara in 2005 and Paris in 2007) and in all its communications. The publishers' alliance has helped the term become internationally accepted and to spread rapidly within the French-speaking world. The term bibliodiversity spreads in the English-speaking world.

== Definition ==
Echoing the concept of biodiversity, "bibliodiversity" refers to the need for a variety of publications to be available to readers within a given environment. Françoise Benhamou, a French specialist of economics of the arts and literature, gave this explanation in her speech at the Assises Internationales de l'Édition Indépendante (International Assembly on Independent Publishing): "In biodiversity, variety refers very simply to the number of species; in the book world, this would be the number of titles. Yet it is clearly insufficient to leave matters there. I will return to this point later. The second factor highlighted by the concept of biodiversity is balance, the balance between the species. If we look at what that means in biodiversity we see the extremely simple idea that if you have several species but some are present in huge numbers while others are very scarce, the ones with many units are likely to eat or prevail over the others. This is what is happening in the book world where it is a matter for concern that the dominance of blockbusters on supermarket shelves and above all in bookstore displays is pushing out other offerings which are more difficult to promote".

Today, bibliodiversity is under threat from overproduction and from financial concentration in the publishing world, which favours the predominance of a few large publishing groups and the pursuit of large profit margins. Increasing emphasis on profitability exacerbates the temptation to reshape editorial policy accordingly. In order to guarantee margins acceptable to shareholders who may be very distant from the publishing house (both physically and culturally), production is recalibrated to enhance its commercial potential. In some cases, the result is a huge imbalance, with commercial logic vastly prevailing over intellectual adventurousness: here, the publisher unreservedly espouses demand-based economics to the detriment of its role of stimulating and purveying new ideas (offering texts which may be challenging, original, non-standard). At the far extreme of the concept of biodiversity, therefore, we find what we might call the "bestsellerisation" of the publishing sphere.

Recognising the fundamental right to defend and promote their cultural sectors – in the face of a generalised deregulation which might at times appear to be the WTO's desired aim – in late 2005 UNESCO's member states signed the Convention on the Protection and Promotion of the Diversity of Cultural Expressions. Concrete measures could now be taken to protect bibliodiversity – cultural diversity in the book world.

== Current challenges ==
While there seems to be some progress on the protection of "local" cultural production, with governments seeking to create an enabling environment for the development of their cultural industries and decision-makers potentially empowered to act, it is becoming a matter of urgency to achieve some way of assessing bibliodiversity via a set of indicators, via quantitative and qualitative data.

Moreover, the digital revolution currently transforming the entire book world – from the creation of texts through to their marketing – could have significant impacts in terms of bibliodiversity. The dematerialisation of the book, the possibility of virtual communications with a much larger group of contacts / readers / buyers (via e-marketing, for example) might suggest that independent publishers and publishers in emerging markets have the potential to raise their profile. On the other hand, the capturing of this emerging marketplace (as yet unproven in economic terms) by new players – online sales platforms, designers and manufacturers of IT equipment (readers in particular), etc. – suggests that the publication production system will reconfigure without promoting greater bibliodiversity at the same time.

== Use and promotion of the concept ==
Various international organisations such as UNESCO and the Latin Union, various cultural and publishing stakeholders such as the Association Internationale des Libraires Francophones (international association of French-speaking booksellers), the Alliance des Éditeurs Indépendants (Alliance of Independent Publishers) and various national publisher associations (AEMI in Mexico, EDIN in Chile, EDINAR in Argentina, FIDARE in Italy, LIBRE in Brazil, etc.) are promoting and protecting bibliodiversity through symposia, meetings and declarations.

A reference work on bibliodiversity was published in 2006.

In 2006, following a letter addressed to the candidates in the French presidential election, the newspaper Le Monde picked up several of the concrete measures proposed to promote bibliodiversity.

Some Spanish-speaking publishers from Latin America launched in 2010 "El Dia B" ("the Bibliodiversity Day", 21 September).

The European Writers' Parliament issued in November 2010 the Istanbul Declaration, in which the bibliodiversity is mentioned: "Policies should be generated to prevent the standardization of expression and promote bibliodiversity".

The first issue of an international journal entitled "Bibliodiversity", co-published by the International Alliance of Independent Publishers and by Double Ponctuation (www.double-communication.com) appeared in January 2011 (see www.bibliodiversity.org).

== Quotations ==
Françoise Rivière, Assistant Director-General for Culture at UNESCO, in her speech opening the Assises Internationales de l'Édition Indépendante (International Assembly on Independent Publishing – Paris, July 2007): "Just as it seeks to highlight the complementary nature of the aims of biodiversity and cultural diversity on the global scene, UNESCO is also closely monitoring the issue of diversity of expression and content in the international book market. In other words, it is paying very close attention to what some people call "bibliodiversity" – a word that has become widely adopted and is beginning to enter common usage".

Ségolène Royal, President of the Poitou Charentes Regional Council, 28 January 2008: "This bibliodiversity we are defending – a bibliodiversity accessible to all, open to all – underpins equal opportunities for education and access to knowledge".

The Jussieu Call for Open Science and Bibliodiversity, 10 October 2017: "We find it necessary to foster an Open Access model that is not restricted to a single approach based on the transfer of subscriptions towards APCs (publication fees charged to authors to allow free access to their articles). Such an approach would hamper innovation and otherwise would slow if not check the advent of bibliodiversity....Open Access must be complemented by support for the diversity of those acting in scientific publishing – what we call bibliodiversity – putting an end to the dominance of a small number among us imposing their terms to scientific communities."

== See also ==
=== Related articles (in French) ===
- Livre équitable (Fairtrade books)
- Éditeurs indépendants (independent publishers)
- Bibliodiversité (in French)

== Links and external documents ==
- Trois Espaces Linguistiques: Organisation Internationale de la Francophonie (organisation of French-speaking countries), *Latin Union, CPLP (Community of Portuguese Language Countries), Organisation of Ibero-American States[(article on independent publishers in the Latin world; French only)]
- International Alliance of Independent Publishers
- Website of the international journal “Bibliodiversity”
- El Día de la Bibliodiversidad, "El Día B"
- The European Writers' Parliament, Declaration of Istanbul 2010
