= Kathryn Graddy =

Professor of economics

- Education: Princeton University; Columbia University; Tulane University
- Scientific career
- Workplaces: Brandeis University
- Thesis: Who pays more? Essays on bargaining and price discrimination. (1994)
- Doctoral advisor: Orley Ashenfelter

Kathryn Graddy is a professor of economics and the dean of Brandeis International Business School at Brandeis University. She is the Fred and Rita Richman Distinguished Professor in Economics at Brandeis University. Her research interests include the economics of art, culture, and industrial organization.

== Career ==
Graddy received a BS in mathematics and a BA in Russian language from Tulane University, an MBA from Columbia University, and a PhD in economics from Princeton University. Prior to her position at the University of Oxford, she was appointed as an assistant professor of economics at the London Business School. Afterwards, she was a research fellow at Jesus College and then at Exeter College.

After leaving Oxford, Graddy joined Brandeis University in 2007. She chaired the university's department of economics from 2011 to 2014 and directed the PhD program at Brandeis International Business School (IBS) from 2015 to 2016. In 2013, she was made the Fred and Rita Richman Distinguished Professor in Economics. She was named senior associate dean of IBS in 2016, a position she held until she became dean in 2018.

== Research ==
Graddy discusses competition at the Fulton Fish Market with the CORE Project

Graddy's research interests include the economics of art, culture, and industrial organization. She has been widely quoted in the media as an expert on art auctions and investment in art.

Graddy spent a month shadowing a trader at the Fulton Fish Market to analyze competition within fish markets, and published the results in 2006 study finding that traders appeared to charge different prices to different ethnic groups and that perfect competition at the market was not apparent.

In a 2017 paper co-authored with Princeton University economist Carl Lieberman, the two economists concluded that "artists, in the year following the death of a friend or relative, are on average less creative than at other times of their lives." The results were based on an analysis of thirty-three French Impressionist painters and fifteen American artists born between 1910 and 1920. The results, which were featured in the popular press, followed an earlier working paper by Graddy that found that visual artists' creative output suffered during periods of bereavement.

== Selected publications ==
- Krugman, Paul R.; Wells, Robin; Graddy, Kathryn Jo (2008). Economics. New York: Basingstoke: W. H. Freeman; Palgrave [distributor]. ISBN 978-0-7167-9956-6.
- Ashenfelter, Orley; Graddy, Kathryn (September 2003). "Auctions and the Price of Art". Journal of Economic Literature. 41 (3): 763–786. doi:10.1257/002205103322436188. S2CID 153448856.
- Joshua D. Angrist; Kathryn Graddy; Guido W. Imbens (July 2000). "The Interpretation of Instrumental Variables Estimators in Simultaneous Equations Models with an Application to the Demand for Fish". The Review of Economic Studies. 67 (3): 499–527. doi:10.1111/1467-937x.00141. ISSN 0034-6527. Zbl 1055.91519. Wikidata Q108879150.
- Beggs, Alan; Graddy, Kathryn (Autumn 1997). "Declining Values and the Afternoon Effect: Evidence from Art Auctions". The RAND Journal of Economics. 28 (3): 544. doi:10.2307/2556028. JSTOR 2556028.
- Beggs, Alan; Graddy, Kathryn (May 1, 2009). "Anchoring Effects: Evidence from Art Auctions". American Economic Review. 99 (3): 1027–1039. doi:10.1257/aer.99.3.1027.
- Graddy, Kathryn (1995). "Testing for Imperfect Competition at the Fulton Fish Market". The RAND Journal of Economics. 26 (1): 75–92. doi:10.2307/2556036. JSTOR 2556036.
