= Ruth Towse =

British economist

Ruth Towse is a British economist and Professor of Economics of Creative Industries at Bournemouth University and Professor Emerita at Erasmus University, Rotterdam. A leading authority in cultural economics with a particular emphasis on the economics of media and copyright, she has taught at universities in the UK, the Netherlands, Italy and Thailand. She was married to Mark Blaug.

== Education ==
Towse obtained a BA (Hons) in Political Economy from Reading University in 1964, then proceeding to obtain a MSc in Economics from the London School of Economics and Political Science in 1966. She gained a PhD in Economics from Erasmus University, Rotterdam in 2000.

== Career ==
She was Joint Editor of the Journal of Cultural Economics from 1993 to 2002. She has served as the President of the Association for Cultural Economics International from 2006 to 2008. She is a fellow of the Royal Society of Arts.

== Selected publications ==
=== Books ===
==== Edited books ====
- Towse, Ruth, ed. (2011). A handbook of cultural economics. Cheltenham: Edward Elgar Publishing. doi:10.4337/9780857930576. ISBN 9781848448872.
- Towse, Ruth; Ilde Rizzo, eds. (2002). The Economics of Heritage: A Study in the Political Economy of Culture in Sicily. Cheltenham: Edward Elgar Publishing. ISBN 9781843760412.
- Towse, Ruth, ed. (2002). Copyright in the Cultural Industries. Edward Elgar Publishing. doi:10.4337/9781843765417. ISBN 9781840646610.

==== Authored books ====
- Towse, Ruth (2001). Creativity, Incentive and Reward: An Economic Analysis of Copyright and Culture in the Information Age. Cheltenham: Edward Elgar Publishing. doi:10.4337/9781843767459. ISBN 9781840642544.
- Towse, Ruth (2014). Advanced Introduction to Cultural Economics. Cheltenham: Edward Elgar Publishing. ISBN 9781781954904.

=== Journal articles ===
- Towse, Ruth (2006). "Copyright and artists: a view from cultural economics". Journal of Economic Surveys. 20 (4): 567–585. doi:10.1111/j.1467-6419.2006.00256.x. S2CID 153525469.
- Towse, Ruth (1999). "Copyright and Economic Incentives: An Application to Performers' Rights in the Music Industry". Kyklos. 52 (3): 369–390. doi:10.1111/j.1467-6435.1999.tb00223.x.
- Towse, Ruth (2008). "Why has cultural economics ignored copyright". Journal of Cultural Economics. 32 (4): 243–259. doi:10.1007/s10824-008-9080-0. JSTOR 41811000. S2CID 154605734.
