= Economic history of the arts =

Interdisciplinary field of study

The economic history of the arts is an interdisciplinary field of study situated at the intersection of economic history, art history, and cultural economics. It focuses on the historical analysis of the market, institutional, social, and financial mechanisms that have shaped the production, distribution, circulation, and consumption of cultural goods.

== History ==
The economic history of the arts has its origins in the historical economic interest in the arts. Its imprint in economic thought spans from Adam Smith until recent times. Since the 2000s, there has been interest from the general economic audience in this area, with calls stressing the need to further develop this field.

== Main areas of research ==
The research in the economic history of arts typically concentrates on several core themes:

- socio-economic status of artists
- artistic creativity and innovation
- market structures and institutions
- historical valuations on the art market
- geographical clustering and artistic production
- effects of historical macroeconomic events on demand and supply of arts
