= Françoise Benhamou =

Moroccan-born French economist and official

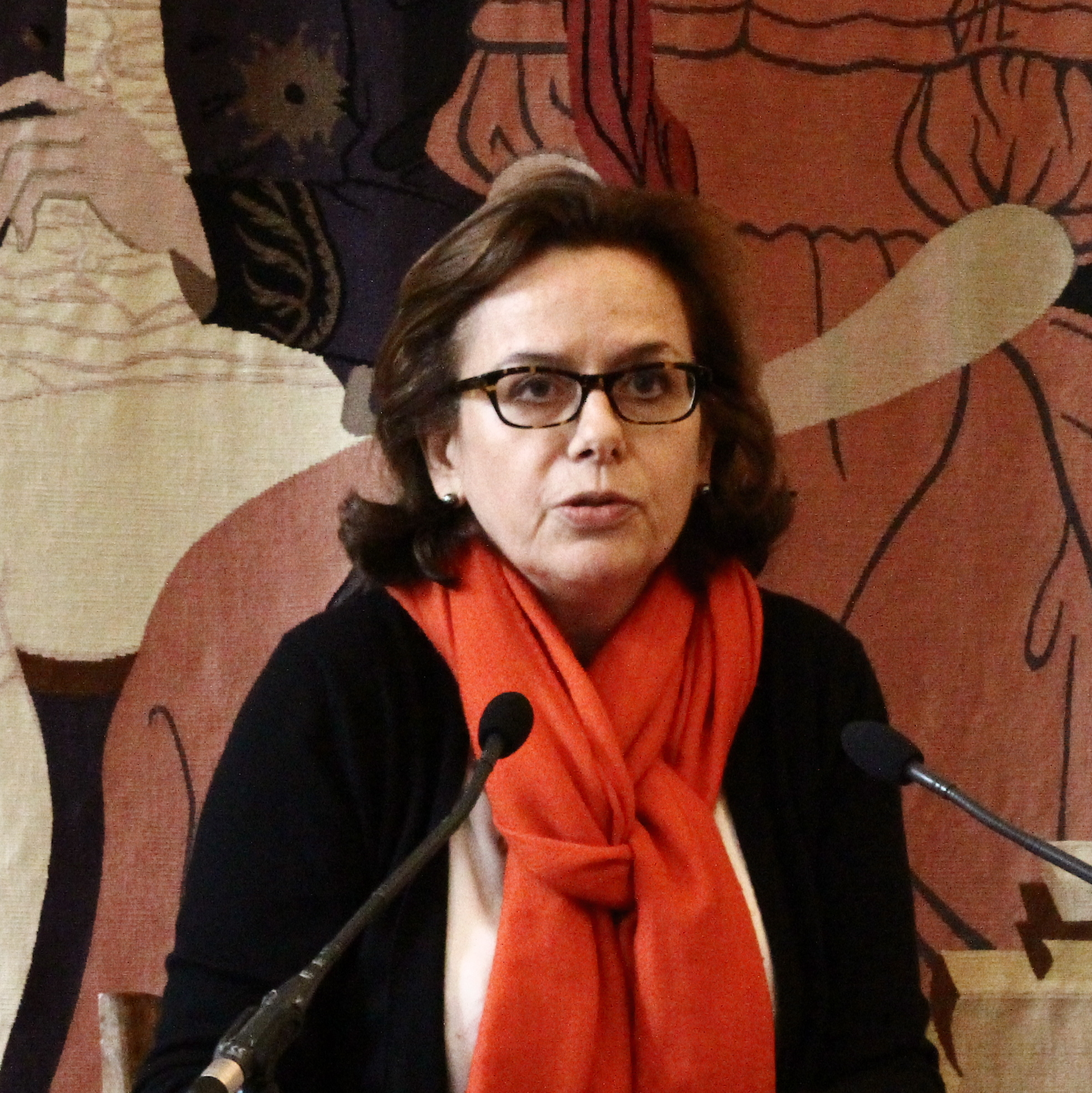
Françoise Benhamou (2013)

Françoise Benhamou (born 12 November 1952) is a Moroccan-born French economist, columnist, and professor. A specialist in the economics of the arts and literature, she serves on the faculties of Sciences Po Lille, Sciences Po Paris, the École Normale Supérieure, and the Sorbonne Paris North University. She is also a member of the Autorité de Régulation des Communications Électroniques, des Postes et de la Distribution de la Presse (ARCEP) from 2012 to 2018.

== Early life and education ==
Françoise Benhamou was born on 12 November 1952 in Oujda, Morocco. She was admitted to the Agrégation de sciences économiques et sociales in 1979. She was admitted to the aggregation of higher education in 2001, in second place.

== Career and research ==
After obtaining the aggregation in 1979, Benhamou became a lecturer at the Paris Nanterre University, as well as a lecturer at the École normale supérieure on rue d'Ulm. She was technical advisor for books and reading to the Minister of Culture, Jack Lang, between 1991 and 1993. Until 2008, she was a professor at the University of Rouen Normandy and a researcher at MATISSE at the Paris 1 Panthéon-Sorbonne University. In September 2009, she was charged by the Department of Studies, Foresight and Statistics (DEPS) of the Ministry of Culture and Communication with a study on the economic models of digital books, in France and abroad. For two years, she was vice-president of the Sorbonne Paris North University in charge of international relations. She also taught at the Paris 1 Panthéon-Sorbonne University, the Institut national de l'audiovisuel, the National Heritage Institute, the University of Turin and the Senghor University of Alexandria.

Benhamou participated in the Scientific Council of the National Heritage Institute, and in the executive office of the Association for Cultural Economics International (elected president of the association in 2010 for a two-year term). She also served on the editorial board of the Journal of Cultural Economics and on the Arte Program Advisory Committee. She directed the master’s degree in economics “Expertise and risk management” at the University of Rouen Normandy. In 2009, she was elected to the Cercle des économistes. Benhamou is an expert with UNESCO.

Benhamou serves as a professor at Sorbonne Paris North University (Villetaneuse) and is the head of the “Heritage Economy” sector at the Institut national du patrimoine. Since 2017, she is also a professor at Sciences Po Lille, where she teaches the economics of culture.

She is a member of the editorial boards of the magazine Esprit and the journal Bibliodiversité(s), revue universitaire du livre dans la mondialisation (Bibliodiversité(s), academic journal of books in globalization). She is a member of the steering committee of the Fondation Jean-Jaurès, a political think tank close to the Socialist Party, a member of the board of directors of the Observatory of Cultural Policies of Grenoble, and a member of the board of directors of the Louvre. She was a weekly columnist for the radio show Soft Power on France Culture on Sunday evenings and wrote the column entitled En plein culture on Rue89. Benhamou writes a blog on the book market in the Livres-Hebdo magazine.

During the 2012 French presidential election, Benhamou signed the appeal of economists in support of candidate François Hollande because of "the relevance of the options [proposed], in particular with regard to the resumption of growth and employment". On 6 January 2012 she was appointed by the President of the Senate, Jean-Pierre Bel, to be a member of the college of Autorité de Régulation des Communications Électroniques, des Postes et de la Distribution de la Presse (ARCEP) to replace Nicolas Curien at the end of his mandate; she was replaced on 6 February 2018 by Joëlle Cottenye.

== Personal life ==
Her husband is Hassan Benhamou.

== Awards and honours ==
- Commander, Ordre des Arts et des Lettres, by the decree of 8 March 2018
- Knight, Legion of Honour, by decree of 21 March 2008, for her 29 years of literary activities and civil services
- Officer, Ordre national du Mérite, by decree of 14 November 2016

== Selected works ==
- 1987, L'Évolution des libraires et le prix unique du livre, with E. Archambault, J. Lallement & M. Kaspy), Paris, La Documentation française, 1987
- 1988, Histoire des pensées économiques (with Maurice Baslé, Bernard Chavance et al.), Paris, Dalloz, 2nd edition, 1993 : ISBN 978-2-24801-131-4
- 1996, L'Économie de la culture, coll. "Repères n. 192", Paris, éditions La Découverte, 8th edition, 2017 : ISBN 978-2-70719-704-7
- 2001, Les Galeries d’art contemporain en France : portrait et enjeux face à la mondialisation, with Dominique Sagot-Duvauroux & Nathalie Moureau, Paris, La Documentation française
- 2002, L'Économie du star system, Paris, Éditions Odile Jacob
- 2006, Les dérèglements de l'exception culturelle : plaidoyer pour une perspective européenne, Paris, Éditions du Seuil
- 2007, Droit d'auteur et copyright (avec Joëlle Farchy), coll. Repères, Paris, éditions La Découverte, ISBN 978-2-34804-362-8
- 2010, Le Patrimoine culturel au risque de l'immatériel, coll. « Droit du patrimoine culturel et naturel », Paris, Éditions L'Harmattan, 150 pages • ISBN 978-2-34804-362-8
- 2011, Valoriser le patrimoine culturel de la France (CAE 97), with David Thesmar, Rapports du CAE, La Documentation française, Paris, 2011
- 2012, Économie du patrimoine culturel, coll. « Repères », Paris, éditions La Découverte, ISBN 978-2-34804-362-8
- 2014, Le Livre à l'heure numérique : papier, écrans, vers un nouveau vagabondage, Paris, coll. « Essais », Éditions du Seuil, ISBN 978-2-02114-060-6
- 2015, Politique culturelle : fin de partie ou nouvelle saison ?, Paris, La Documentation française
- 2021, Ce que la Covid nous a appris (editors, Éric Fottorino, Thomas Jolly, Jérôme Clément, Pierre Rosanvallon, Véronique Olmi et al.), Paris, coll. « Les Indispensables », Éditions Philippe Rey, ISBN 2-84876-872-X
- 2022, Le Don dans l'économie (avec Nathalie Moureau), coll. « Repères », Paris, éditions La Découverte, ISBN 978-2-34806-495-1
- 2022, Des économistes répondent aux populistes (with Hippolyte d'Albis), Paris, Éditions Odile Jacob, ISBN 978-2-41500-187-2
