= Peer Community in =

Scientific organization

Peer Community In
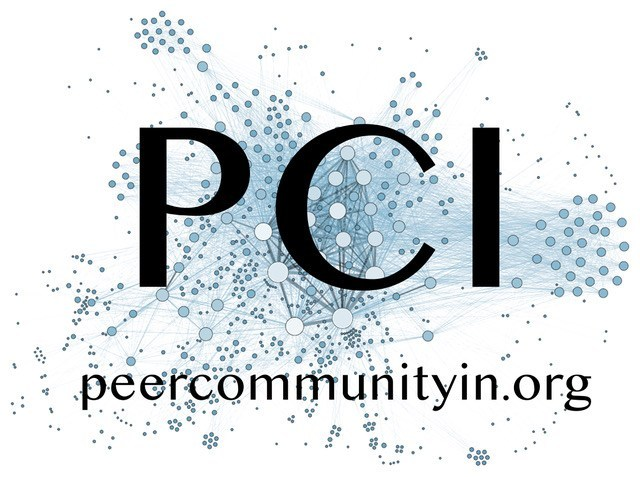
- Website type: Science
- Website: peercommunityin.org
- Commercial: No

Peer Community in (PCI) is a non-profit scientific organization that offers an editorial process of open science by creating specific communities of researchers reviewing and recommending preprints in their field. Since 2021, a new journal, Peer Community Journal', publishes recommended preprints. This initiative offers relief from the cost supported by academic organisations to publishing in open access and provide access to the literature (for papers that are not in open access), which has grown faster than the inflation in the several years.

== General principles ==
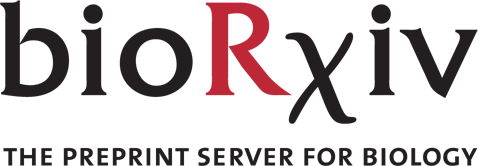
Logo of bioRxiv, an open archive for biology preprints

PCI provides scientific validation of manuscripts, accessible in open archives in accordance with the principle of open access (free access for the author and for the reader), with the recommendations of the experts also being accessible to the reader and citable because they are signed and provided with a digital object identifier. As a whole, the PC Journal is presented like a classic scientific journal, but PCI provides more transparent and advanced services, in addition to being free. It thus bears some similarities with other preprint review platforms, such as PREreview and Review Commons, but it differs from these by making the binary decision to recommend (or not) a preprint.

PCI does not actually publish the scientific articles (except through the PC Journal, which publishes only papers derived from preprints recommended by a PCI thematic), so it is not affected by the Ingelfinger rule which regulates the duplication of publications. The same manuscript can therefore be recommended by PCIs from several disciplines, which is useful for promoting interdisciplinary work. The same manuscript can also be recommended by a PCI in the form of a preprint, then published by a classic journal.

== Compatibility with traditional publishing ==
Many scientific journals accept manuscripts previously distributed via preprints. A manuscript recommended by a PCI therefore remains free for later publication in most "classic" scientific journals.

Authors who have submitted their manuscript to a PCI and have benefited from an improvement-recommendation cycle generally then choose to submit it for publication in a classic journal. Some journals favor this choice, integrating PCI reviews into their own editorial process if they consider them adequate.

== PCI communities ==
There are different PCI communities for different sub-fields, each community with its own managing board, associate editors and external reviewers.

- Animal Science
- Archaeology
- Circuit Neuroscience
- Ecology
- Ecotoxicology and Environmental Chemistry
- Evolutionary Biology
- Forest & Wood Sciences
- Genomics
- Infections
- Mathematical & Computational Biology
- Microbiology
- Network Sciences
- Organization Studies
- Paleontology
- Psychology
- Registered Reports
- Zoology

== Organization ==
Peer Community in was founded in 2016 as a non-profit organization under the French law. Founding members Denis Bourguet, Benoit Facon and Thomas Guillemaud are researchers at the Institut national de la recherche agronomique (INRAE). The organization is an «association loi de 1901» administratively based in Nice.

The Association coordinates the creation and activity of the various disciplinary PCI communities. Each community is funded by its own subsidies, which are very modest, as the editorial model does not provide any financial resources for e.g. author's publication costs, readers' consultation costs or subscriptions to their institutional libraries.

Each disciplinary PCI is made up of a management board comprising around ten recognized experts in the field, several tens or hundreds of associate editors ("recommenders"), and involves external reviewers.

== Recognition ==
A number of higher education institutions are accepting the students' preprints as equivalent to a publication in a peer-reviewed scientific journal, when those preprints are available at an open archive (such as arXiv, bioRxiv, etc.) and are recommended by a PCI.

The PCI initiative is supported by numerous institutions that value open science and bibliodiversity in their practices, such as the CNRS or the INEE. These institutions commit to:

- Consider the PCI system as a legitimate means of evaluating and validating scientific results.
- Treat PCI recommended manuscripts in the same way as articles published in traditional scientific journals.
- Encourage their members, colleagues and students to integrate PCI into their editorial practices (reading, authoring, expertise).

More than 30 academic journals have claimed that they are happy to consider preprints recommended by PCI.

The three co-founders of PCI, along with Marjolaine Hamelin who later joined the team, were awarded the LIBER Award for Library Innovation in 2020 for the development of PCI, a free public system for peer-reviewing and highlighting preprints.

== Media Coverage ==
PCI was initially mostly discussed in the French media. It was discussed in Le Monde as an example of an open-science initiative in scientific publishing. PCI was also described in Sciences et Avenir as an alternative publishing platform that could be a more efficient use of resources for universities and researchers. As of mid-2020, PCI has attracted much more attention worldwide.

== See also ==
- Scientific journal
- Peer review
- Preprint
- Open science
