= Recitation over water =

Various religious and cultural practices

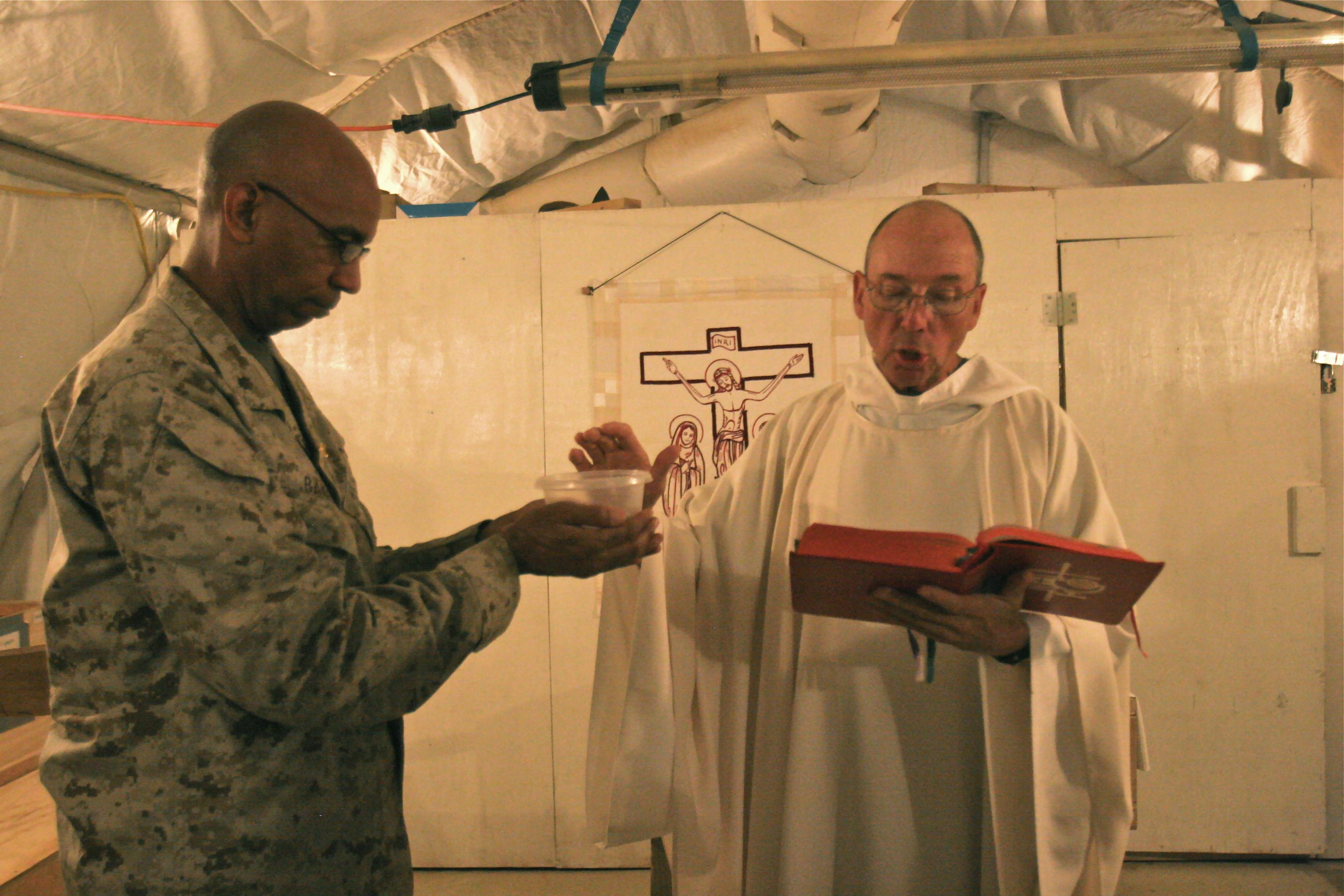
Chaplain Lt. Cmdr. John Burnette blesses water during Easter Vigil Mass at Forward Operating Base Delaram II, Afghanistan, April 23, 2011..

Recitation over water refers to a variety of religious and cultural practices in which prayers, verses, or chants are recited over water, with the intention of blessing, purifying, or conferring beneficial properties to the water. This tradition can be found in many societies throughout history and across the world. The beliefs and rituals associated with recitation over water differ widely among religions and cultures, but typically involve the idea that water, once imbued with spiritual words or intentions, becomes holy or has healing qualities. In many cases, such water is used for purposes including ritual purification, physical or spiritual healing, blessings, and protection from harm or misfortune. The methods, meanings, and significance of these practices vary, reflecting diverse theological and cultural interpretations. Despite these differences, recitation over water remains a notable example of the broader human tendency to associate water with sacredness and transformation.

== Religious practices ==
Recitation over water is noticeable within the five major religions: Islam, Hinduism, Christianity, Buddhism, and Judaism.

=== Islam ===
In Islam, recitation over water means reciting verses from the Qur'an, prayers (duas), or dhikr over water and blowing on it, then drinking or using that water. Muslims follow this ritual hoping for relief from illness, distress, evil influences, or mental stress. This practice is also known as 'Ruqyah water'. The Qur'an states, "What We send down of the Qur'an is healing and mercy for the believers" (Surah Al‑Israʾ 17:82). Authentic hadiths mention that Muhammad recited and blew on water, and his companions used the same practice with water or oil. Islamic scholars agree Ruqyah is a valid treatment based on Qur'an and Sunnah, but the use of amulets, unknown incantations, or anything involving shirk is forbidden. Studies show this practice is widely used among Muslims for spiritual healing, but it is not a substitute for modern medical treatment.

=== Hinduism ===
In Hinduism, holy water holds special importance. Water from the River Ganga ('Ganga water') is considered most sacred. It is sprinkled, consumed, or used as part of pilgrimage practices and ceremonies. In formal worship, priests chant mantras to bless the water, then distribute or sprinkle it over devotees. Rites like Annaprashan or Upanayan also involve chanting and sprinkling of water. Water collected from pilgrimage sites, rivers, ponds, or springs is known as 'tirtha'. It is used for purification and blessings in homes. Research has examined bacterial presence in this water and how it relates to believers' faith.

=== Christianity ===
In Christianity, 'Holy Water' is an important religious element. It is blessed through Scripture readings and prayers. During baptism, water is either poured on the head or is used to immerse the person, symbolizing cleansing from sins and spiritual rebirth. Many churches place holy water fonts near their entrance. Worshippers dip their fingers, make the sign of the cross, and pray for blessings. Social research has examined how holy water rituals and beliefs adapt in modern Christian practice.

=== Buddhism ===
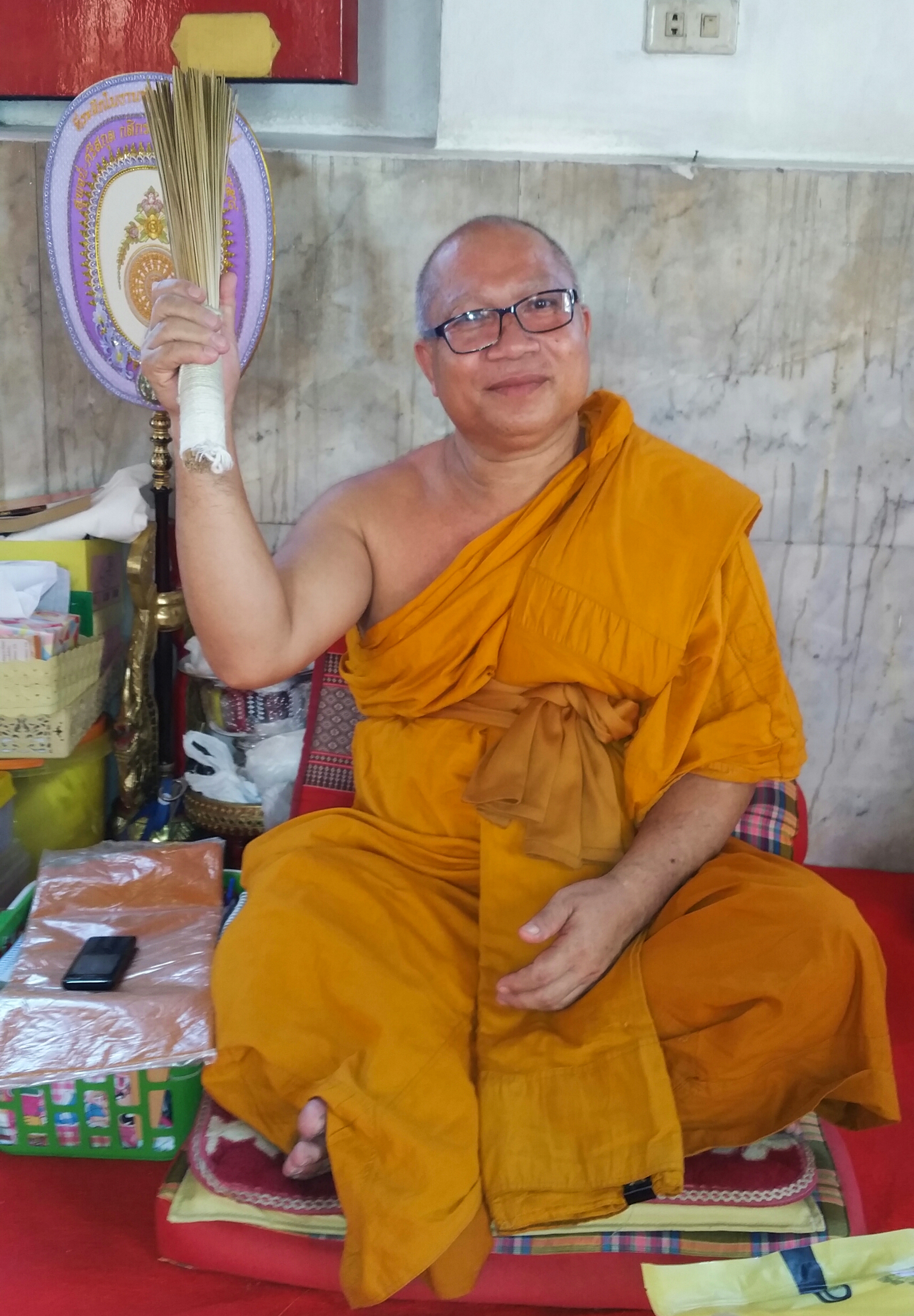
A Buddhist monk blesses and sprinkles holy water at Wat Sriboonreung, Bangkok, Thailand.

In Buddhism, monks recite sutras or stotras to bless water and then sprinkle it on devotees for protection and well-being. In countries like Thailand, Sri Lanka, Myanmar, and Bhutan, sprinkling blessed water is a common practice during religious festivals. Studies explore the psychology and beliefs that surround holy water in Southeast Asian Buddhist traditions.

=== Judaism ===
In Judaism, spiritual and physical purification is achieved by full immersion in a ritual bath called the mikveh. Rabbis sanctify the water with specific prayers and rituals. Research has considered the role of mikveh and holy water in religion, sociology, and health.

== Modern and folk traditions ==
In various African, Latin American, and indigenous cultures, 'healing water' or 'spiritual water' is blessed with songs, chants, or prayers, then sprinkled or consumed for healing, well‑being, or blessings.

== Comparative table ==
Religion	Use of holy water	Purpose
Islam	Qur'an/prayer recitation, blowing on water	Healing, blessing, protection
Hinduism	Ganga water, mantra chanting, tirtha water	Purification, blessings, liberation
Christianity	Bible readings, prayer, baptism	Sin cleansing, blessings, spiritual purity
Buddhism	Monk recitation of sutras/stotras	Well‑being, welfare, blessing
Judaism	Mikveh immersion, prayer water	Purification, spiritual cleanliness

== Scientific and sociological evaluation ==
Modern science remains neutral on recitation over water or holy water rituals. Medical research has not proven direct physical benefits. However, these rituals are important for mental comfort, religious belief, community unity, and spiritual strength. Globally, religious water practices like holy water, ruqyah, mikveh, etc., help strengthen social bonds and personal emotional security. Sociologists have also explored the psychological and social significance of water in religious ceremonies.

== Books ==
- O'Flaherty, Wendy Doniger (2000). The Rig Veda: An Anthology. Penguin Classics. ISBN 978-0-14-044989-1.
- Strong, John S. (2002). The Experience of Buddhism: Sources and Interpretations. Wadsworth. ISBN 9780534191641.

== Academic studies ==
- Gross, Rita M. (1988), "Healing Rituals in Buddhist Practice", Religion, 18 (1): 41–53, doi:10.1016/0048-721X(88)90037-1 (inactive 6 July 2025)
- Lisak, Miriam (1973), "The Ritual Bath (Mikveh) in Jewish Tradition", Jewish Social Studies, 35 (2): 107–116
