= Association for Cultural Economics International =

The Association for Cultural Economics International (ACEI) is an international association of academics, practitioners, professionals, and policymakers dedicated to promoting scholarly research into the economics of the arts and cultural activities.

The beginnings of the association date to the 1970s when William Hendon, along with James Shanahan and colleagues from the University of Akron, Ohio, formed the Association for Cultural Economics (ACE). In 1977, Hendon created the Journal of Cultural Economics (JCE), which he edited himself and produced from a single printing press. The newly formed ACE and JCE captured the interest of economists, including Mark Blaug, William Baumol, and Sir Alan Peacock. The contributions of these economists others to the ACE and the Journal of Cultural Economics laid the foundations for the field of cultural economics.

The consolidation of this society of study was achieved through the organisation of the ACE’s first international conference of cultural economics in Edinburgh, Scotland, in 1979, by Sir Alan Peacock.

== Conferences ==
Following the initial debut, the ACE held further conferences and workshops in collaboration with host organizations around the world. These conferences sparked global discussion and scholarly investigation into the integral role of the arts in economic development. Over time, the focus of discussion at these conferences evolved towards data-based and empirical analysis of the arts and culture, which gave rise to the development of various econometric modelling techniques as well as alternative methods for quantifying the true value of creative arts, heritage, and culture. As a result, ACEI has become the go-to organisation for many academics and other professionals with an interest in the arts and cultural practices.

=== List of international conferences ===
Year	Other Information	City	Country
1979	1st International Conference	Edinburgh	Scotland
1982	2nd International Conference	Maastricht	Netherlands
1984	3rd International Conference	Akron, Ohio	USA
1986	4th International Conference	Avignon	France
1988	5th International Conference	Ottawa	Canada
1990	6th International Conference	Umea	Sweden
1992	7th International Conference	Fort Worth, Texas	USA
1994	8th International Conference	Witten/Herdecke	Germany
1996	9th International Conference	Boston, Massachusetts	USA
1998	10th International Conference	Barcelona	Spain
2000	11th International Conference	Minneapolis, Minnesota	USA
2002	12th International Conference	Rotterdam	Netherlands
2004	13th International Conference	Chicago, Illinois	USA
2006	14th International Conference	Vienna	Austria
2008	15th International Conference	Boston, Massachusetts	USA
2010	16th International Conference	Copenhagen	Denmark
2012	17th International Conference	Kyoto	Japan
2014	18th International Conference	Montreal	Canada
2016	19th International Conference	Valladolid	Spain
2018	20th International Conference	Melbourne	Australia
2021	21st International Conference	Online	Globally
2023	22nd International Conference	Bloomington, Indiana	USA
2025	23rd International Conference	Rotterdam	Netherlands

=== List of workshops ===
Year	Workshop	Host institution	Country
European Workshop on Applied Cultural Economics (EWACE)
2003	1st EWACE	University of Bologna	Italy
2005	2nd EWACE	University of Oviedo	Spain
2007	3rd EWACE	University of Catania	Italy
2009	4th EWACE	Adnan Menderes University	Türkiye
2011	5th EWACE	Trinity College Dublin	Ireland
2013	6th EWACE	University of Ljubljana	Slovenia
2015	7th EWACE	Austrian Institute of Economic Research (WIFO)	Austria
2017	8th EWACE	Krakow University of Economics	Poland
2019	9th EWACE	Copenhagen Business School	Denmark
2022	10th EWACE	University of Turin	Italy
2024	11th EWACE	University of Valladolid	Spain
2026	12th EWACE	Instituto Superior de Contabilidade e Administração do Porto (ISCAP) & Faculty of Economics, University of Porto	Portugal
North American Workshop on Cultural Economics (NAWCE)
2011	1st NAWCE	Brandeis University, Université du Québec à Montréal (UQAM) & Southern Economic Association	United States / Canada
2013	2nd NAWCE	Brandeis University, Université du Québec à Montréal (UQAM) & Southern Economic Association	United States / Canada
2015	3rd NAWCE	Brandeis University, Université du Québec à Montréal (UQAM) & Southern Economic Association	United States / Canada
2017	4th NAWCE	Université du Québec à Montréal (UQAM) & CIRANO	Canada
2019	5th NAWCE	Université du Québec à Montréal (UQAM) & Southern Economic Association	Canada
2022	6th NAWCE	Florida Gulf Coast University & Southern Economic Association	United States
2024	7th NAWCE	Florida Gulf Coast University & Southern Economic Association	United States
2026	8th NAWCE	Arts, Entrepreneurship & Innovation Lab, Indiana University	United States
Asian Workshop on Cultural Economics (AWCE)
2011	1st AWCE	Japan Association of Cultural Economics (JACE) & Doshisha University	Japan
2013	2nd AWCE	Japan Association of Cultural Economics (JACE)	Japan
2015	3rd AWCE	Japan Association of Cultural Economics (JACE) & Doshisha University	Japan
2017	4th AWCE	Japan Association of Cultural Economics (JACE) & Doshisha University	Japan
2019	5th AWCE	RMIT Vietnam	Vietnam
2022	6th AWCE	Singapore Management University	Singapore
2024	7th AWCE	Institute of Public Collaboration	South Korea
2026	8th AWCE	Center for the Study of the Creative Economy, Doshisha University	Japan
Iberoamerican Seminar on Cultural Economics (SIEC)
2017	1st SIEC	National University of Colombia	Colombia
2019	2nd SIEC	Austral University of Chile	Chile
2022	3rd SIEC	Federal University of Minas Gerais	Brazil
2024	4th SIEC	National Autonomous University of Mexico (UNAM)	Mexico
2026	5th SIEC	Universidad Técnica Particular de Loja	Ecuador

== Association structure ==
The ACEI exists as a membership association with elected officers, an executive board, and an official constitution.

=== Presidents ===
The administrative and academic development of the ACEI has been overseen by its successive presidents. A chronological list of all the presidents is provided below:

Presidential period	President's name	Affiliation	Country
1992 - 1994	Dick Netzer	New York University	USA
1994 - 1996	Michael Hutter	Witten/Herdecke University	Germany
1996 - 1998	David Throsby	Macquarie University	Australia
1998 - 2000	John O'Hagan	Trinity College Dublin	Ireland
2000 - 2002	Bruce Seaman	Georgia State University	USA
2002 - 2004	Victor Ginsburgh	Université Libre de Bruxelles	Belgium
2004 - 2006	Charles M. Gray	University of St. Thomas	USA
2006 - 2008	Ruth Towse	Bournemouth University	United Kingdom
2008 - 2010	Gillian Doyle	University of Glasgow	United Kingdom
2010 - 2012	Roberto Zanola	Amedeo Avogadro University of Eastern Piedmont	Italy
2012 - 2014	Françoise Benhamou	University Sorbonne Paris Nord	France
2014 - 2016	Arjo Klamer	Erasmus University Rotterdam	Netherlands
2016 - 2018	Ilde Rizzo	University of Catania	Italy
2018 - 2021	Alan Collins	Nottingham Trent University	United Kingdom
2021 - 2023	Trine Bille	Copenhagen Business School	Denmark
2023 - 2025	Luis Cesar Herrero	University of Valladolid	Spain
2025 - on going	Karol J. Borowiecki	University of Southern Denmark	Denmark
