= Cultural institutions studies =

Academic study of cultural activity

Cultural institutions studies (a translation of the German term Kulturbetriebslehre) is an academic approach "which investigates activities in the cultural sector, conceived as historically evolved societal forms of organising the conception, production, distribution, propagation, interpretation, reception, conservation and maintenance of specific cultural goods".

== Research programme ==
The cultural sector constitutes an interface between differing social spheres: social structures (classes, genders, ethnic groupings, etc.) interact with cultural formations (forms of expression, styles, values, habits of reception, etc.) and simultaneously overlap with economic interests and political aspects. Cultural institutions studies adopted the aim of overcoming mono disciplinary approaches and has therefore been conceived as amalgamation of cultural studies, social science, economics and political science. Consequently, this new approach investigates cultural goods, processes of meaning and value creation through cultural practices, financing structures, value added formation structures, processes of (de-)institutionalisation, organisational changes in the cultural sector, legal frameworks, cultural policy conceptions and instruments, etc. – each of those topics resulting from a synergetic confluence of forces, conditions, concrete intentions and local constellations.

== Research levels ==
The German word "Kulturbetrieb" has two major shades of meaning:

1. From a macro-sociological perspective, "Kulturbetrieb" is an abstract social science term denoting a sector (or "system", or "field", or "segment", etc.) of society, which, from the 18th century onwards, gradually developed together with modern bourgeois society, forming internally differentiated institutions. (The term "cultural industry" is deliberately not used in this context because this term is mainly embedded in an economic view of the field.)
2. Secondly, "Kulturbetrieb" also denotes an enterprise or cultural organisation (e.g. an association, foundation, commercial company, limited company, etc.) which combines and uses human and financial resources to achieve certain aims in the most efficient way possible. At this micro-level, both organisations and individual actors are relevant.

This implies that, to deal with and appreciate adequately both collective and individual action, the discipline cultural institutions studies must not only be concerned with aspects of organisational theory but also with questions of social practices, social psychology, occupational sociology, theories of socialisation, gender as well as epistemology. Of central importance is the fact that the macro and the micro levels refer to and mutually influence each other.

== Research objects ==
Cultural institutions studies investigate the formation of cultural goods and services as well as their transformation into commodities for trade or into cultural industry products. In the pursuit of cultural activities, besides actual production and distribution of cultural goods and services, processes of meaning and value negotiation and the elaboration of preferences and perceptual habits play an important role. Since many cultural activities take place in an almost completely institutionalised setting, cultural institutions studies are also concerned with financing structures, value-added chains, organisational change in the cultural sector, and with legal and cultural policy frameworks. Taking the approach of institutional and organisational theory, cultural institutions studies also investigate processes occurring place within individual companies, as well as certain structural characteristics in cultural management. Aspects of occupational sociology connected with division of labour and integration of different types of activity are also relevant to understanding co-operation of different occupational groups in the cultural sector or in cultural industries.

== Delineation of the discipline ==
Although cultural institutions studies has been defined as an "inter-discipline", the following delimitation ought to contribute to further clarification of its profile.

1. While culture management studies – analogous to management studies – are usually considered to be an application oriented discipline, cultural institutions studies are basically not oriented in this way. This new discipline observes, analyses and comments on structures and processes in the cultural sector and in cultural organisations. Its goal is to indirectly influence cultural policy, cultural economics, and conditions within cultural enterprises, i.e., their management and administration. In this way, cultural institutions studies is also concerned with theory-building.
2. Cultural institutions studies focuses on the emergence and development of specific cultural goods. This approach keeps a certain (but not critical) distance to the mainstream conception of "culture" usually encountered in contemporary cultural studies and sociology of culture. Speaking generally, anything created by man and enabled through socialisation is conceived as part of "culture". Cultural institutions studies, however, uses a narrower definition of "culture", reserving the term "cultural good" to artefacts embedded in a concrete institutional setting. Of course, historically, there were periods when music or painting were able to develop without any institutional setting. Researchers active in cultural institutions studies, however, generally insist that cultural goods and practices "cannot be understood apart from the contexts in which they are produced and consumed".
3. Commercial activities in cultural sector presuppose clear ownership relations as well as the establishment of scarcity: both are due to legal and economic policy interventions. However, in contrast to common traditional cultural economics studies, cultural institutions studies proceed from the assumption that the formation of non economic value is not just an accidental accompaniment of price formation. Monetary and non monetary value formation processes are mutually related to each other, often in a very tense relationship. Cultural goods with an exchange function must therefore be comprehensively analysed, taking into consideration all their multiple symbolic and economic, private and public, social and political functions.

To sum up: The focus on cultural institutions sphere demands a synthesis of cultural, sociological, organizational, and economic methods of analysis and interpretation to create a multi-perspective approach to the relevant issues. However, culture and cultural practices are definitely not an object that may be observed and described from a distant, "scientific" point of view. Cultural issues are matters of public interest and are interwoven with personal and collective identities as well as with normative and political positions. Cultural institutions studies do not claim objectivity and a positivistic analysis. But it is a necessity to embark on a debate about presuppositions of research. This points to the critical philosophical roots of this approach.

== See also ==
- Art world
- Convention on the Protection and Promotion of the Diversity of Cultural Expressions
- Creative industries
- Culture industry
- Cultural policy
- Cultural practice
- Economics of the arts and literature
- Goods
- Non-profit sector
- Sociology of culture
- Value theory
