= The International Alliance of Independent Publishers =

French non-profit association

- Alliance internationale des éditeurs indépendants
- Formation: 2002
- Type: Non-profit association
- Headquarters: 38 rue Saint-Sabin Paris, France 75011

The International Alliance of Independent Publishers (known in France as L'Alliance internationale des éditeurs indépendants) is a French non-profit association, known in particular for its work on the Fair Book label and the notion of bibliodiversity. It was founded in 2002, following a meeting of book professionals in Paris, France in 2001.

It has received long-term or occasional support from institutions such as the Charles Léopold Mayer Foundation, the Ford Foundation, UNESCO, the Latin Union, the Organisation internationale de la francophonie, and the Prince Claus Foundation.
