= Neil De Marchi =

- Born: 25 December 1939
- Died: April 2026 (aged 86)

Academic background
- Education: University of Oxford

Academic work
- Discipline: Economist
- Institutions: Duke University

Neil De Marchi (25 December 1939 – April 2026) was an Australian economist and historian of economic thought and was a professor at Duke University. De Marchi specialized in both teaching and research that pertains to the history of economic ideas and the history of markets, and also the functioning of markets, with a specific focus on art markets. His works appeared in such journals as the Journal of Economic Behavior and Organization, the Journal of Econometrics, the European Journal for the History of Economic Thought, and the Art Bulletin. He also contributed to pieces within various books, having written introductions to such works as “Idealization in Economics, Poznan Studies 38,” and a biographical entry of John Stuart Mill for The Handbook of Economic Methodology. De Marchi received his Ph.D. from the Australian National University in 1970, after completing his B.Phil. in economics at the University of Oxford. He also obtained his B.Ec. with first-class honors in 1960 from the University of Western Australia. He was a Distinguished Fellow of the History of Economics Society.

His death was announced on 21 April 2026.

== Selected publications ==
- "The Empirical Content and Longevity of Ricardian Economics," Economica, 1970
- "Mill and Cairnes and the Emergence of Marginalism in England," History of Political Economy, 1972
- "‘The Noxious Influence of Authority’: A Correction of Jevons’ Charge," Journal of Law and Economics, 1973
- "Malthus and Ricardo’s Inductivist Critics: Four Letters to William Whewell,"(with R.P. Sturges), Economica, 1973
- "The Success of Mill’s Principles," History of Political Economy, 1974
- "Anomaly and the Progress of Economics: The Case of the Leontief Paradox," in Spiro J. Latsis (ed.), Method and Appraisal in Economics, 1976
- "On the Early Dangers of Being too Political an Economist: Thorold Rogers and the 1868 Election to the Drummond Professorship," Oxford Economic Papers, 1976
- "The Case for James Mill," in A.W. Coats (ed.), Methodological Controversy in Economics: Historical Essays in Honour of T.W. Hutchison, 1983
- "HOPE and the Journal Literature in the History of Economic Thought," (with John Lodewijks) History of Political Economy, 1983
- "Methodology: A Comment on Boland and Frazer, I," (with Abraham Hirsch), AER, 1984
- "Mill’s Unrevised Philosophy of Economics. A Comment on Hausman," Philosophy of Science 1986
- "Making a Case when Theory is Unfalsifiable: Friedman’s Monetary History,” (with Abraham Hirsch), Economics and Philosophy, 1986
- "Abstinence", "Non-competing Groups", "Paradoxes and Anomalies", "Nassau Senior", in John Eatwell, Murray Milgate and Peter Newman (eds.), The New Palgrave Dictionary of Economics, 1987
- "John Stuart Mill Interpretation since Schumpeter", in Willam Thweatt(ed.), Classical Political Economy, 1988
- The Popperian Legacy in Economics (edited, with introduction), 1988
- Milton Friedman. Economics in Theory and Practice (with Abraham Hirsch), 1990.
- "League of Nations Economists and the Ideal of Peaceful Change in the 1930s", (with Peter Dohlman), in Economics and National Security. Annual Supplement to History of Political Economy, 1991
- de Marchi, Neil; Blaug, Mark (1991). Appraising economic theories : studies in the methodology of research programs. Aldershot, Hants, England Brookfield, Vt: Edward Elgar Publishing Co. ISBN 9781852785154.
- Post-Popperian Methodology of Economics (edited, with introduction), 1992
- Non-Natural Social Science. Reflecting on the Enterprise of 'More Heat Than Light'. Annual Supplement to History of Political Economy (ed.), 1993
- Idealization in Economics (ed. with Bert Hamminga), Poznan Studies, 1994
- "Art, Value, and Market Practices in the Seventeenth Century Netherlands", (with Hans J. Van Miegroet), Art Bulletin, 1994
- Higgling. Transactors and Their Markets in the History of Economic Thought. Annual Supplement to History of Political Economy, (ed.with Mary S. Morgan), 1994
