= Cultural practice =

Manifestation of a culture or sub-culture

Cultural practice is the manifestation of a culture or sub-culture, especially in regard to the traditional and customary practices of a particular ethnic or other cultural group.

The term is gaining in importance due to the increased controversy over "rights of cultural practice", which are protected in many jurisdictions for indigenous peoples and sometimes ethnic minorities. It is also a major component of the field of cultural studies, and is a primary focus of international works such as the United Nations declaration of the rights of indigenous Peoples.

Cultural practice is also a subject of discussion in questions of cultural survival. If an ethnic group retains its formal ethnic identity but loses its core cultural practices or the knowledge, resources, or ability to continue them, questions arise as to whether the culture is able to actually survive at all. International bodies such as the United Nations Permanent Forum on Indigenous Issues continually work on these issues, which are increasingly at the forefront of globalization questions.

== Examples ==
- Medical treatment practices
- Forms of artistic expression
- Dietary preferences and culinary practices
- Cultural institutions (see also cultural institutions studies)
- Natural resource management
- Housing and construction
- Childcare practices
- Governance, leadership, conflict resolution
- Power relationships
- International cultural practices
- "Everyday life" practices (including household relationships)

== Qualifications ==
The real question of what qualifies as a legitimate cultural practice is the subject of much legal and ethnic community debate. The question arises in controversial subject areas such as genital mutilation, indigenous hunting and gathering practices, and the question of licensing of traditional medical practitioners.

Many traditional cultures acknowledge members outside of their ethnicity as cultural practitioners, but only under special circumstances. Generally, the knowledge or title must be passed in a traditional way, such as family knowledge shared through adoption, or through a master of that practice choosing a particular student who shows qualities desired for that practice, and teaching that student in a hands-on manner, in which they are able to absorb the core values and belief systems of the culture. The degree to which these non-ethnic practitioners are able to exercise "customary and traditional" rights, and the degree to which their practice is acknowledged as valid, is often a subject of considerable debate among indigenous and other ethnic communities, and sometimes with the legal systems under which these communities function. The difference between bona fide non-native cultural practitioners and cultural piracy, or cultural appropriation, is a major issue within the study of globalization and modernization.

== Evolution of culture ==
The evolution of traditional cultures is a subject of much discussion in legal, scholarly, and community forums. It is generally accepted that all cultures are to some degree in a continual state of sociocultural evolution. However, major questions surround the legitimacy of newly evolved cultural expressions, especially when these are influenced by modernization or by the influence of other cultures.

Also, there is significant debate surrounding the source of evolution: for example, an indigenous community may accept the use of store-bought materials in the creation of traditional arts, but may reject requirements to apply for a permit for certain gathering purposes; the central difference being that one is an internal cultural evolution, while the other is externally driven by the society or legal body that surrounds the culture.
