= Fulton Fish Market =

Wholesale seafood market in New York City

Coordinates: 40.805°N 73.878°W

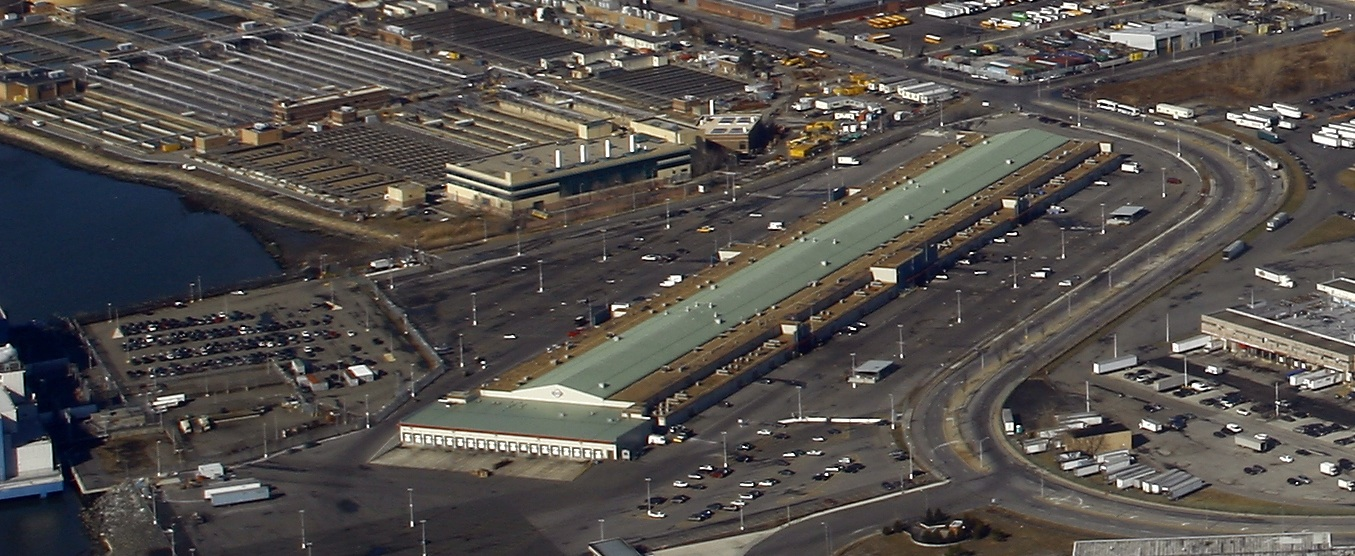
The Fulton Fish Market

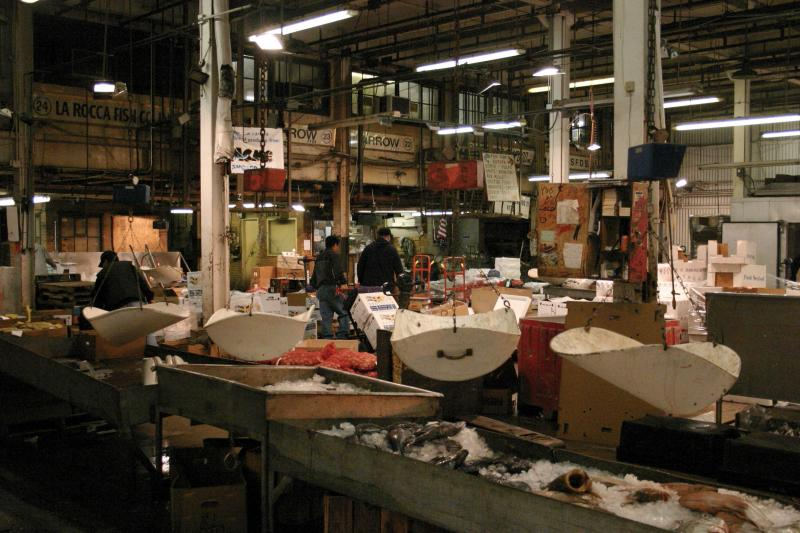
The interior of the old Fulton Fish Market in Downtown Manhattan

The Fulton Fish Market is a fish market in Hunts Point, a section of the New York City borough of the Bronx. It was originally a wing of the Fulton Market, established in 1822 to sell a variety of foodstuffs and produce. In November 2005, the Fish Market relocated to a new facility in Hunts Point in the Bronx, from its historic location at the South Street Seaport (along the East River waterfront at and above Fulton Street) in the Financial District of Lower Manhattan.

During much of its 183-year tenure at the original site, the Fulton Fish Market was the most important wholesale East Coast fish market in the United States. Opened in 1822, it was the destination of fishing boats from across the Atlantic Ocean. By the 1950s, most of the Market's fish were trucked in rather than offloaded from the docks. The wholesalers at the Market then sold it to restaurateurs and retailers who purchased a wide variety of fresh fish.

Prices at the Fulton Fish Market were tracked and reported by the United States government. In its original location, it was one of the last, and most significant, of the great wholesale food markets of New York. It survived major fires in 1835, 1845, 1918, and 1995. In its new location in Hunts Point, the Fulton Fish Market Cooperative handles millions of pounds of seafood daily, with annual sales exceeding $1 billion, and is second in size only to Tokyo's Toyosu Market.

== History ==
=== Nineteenth century ===
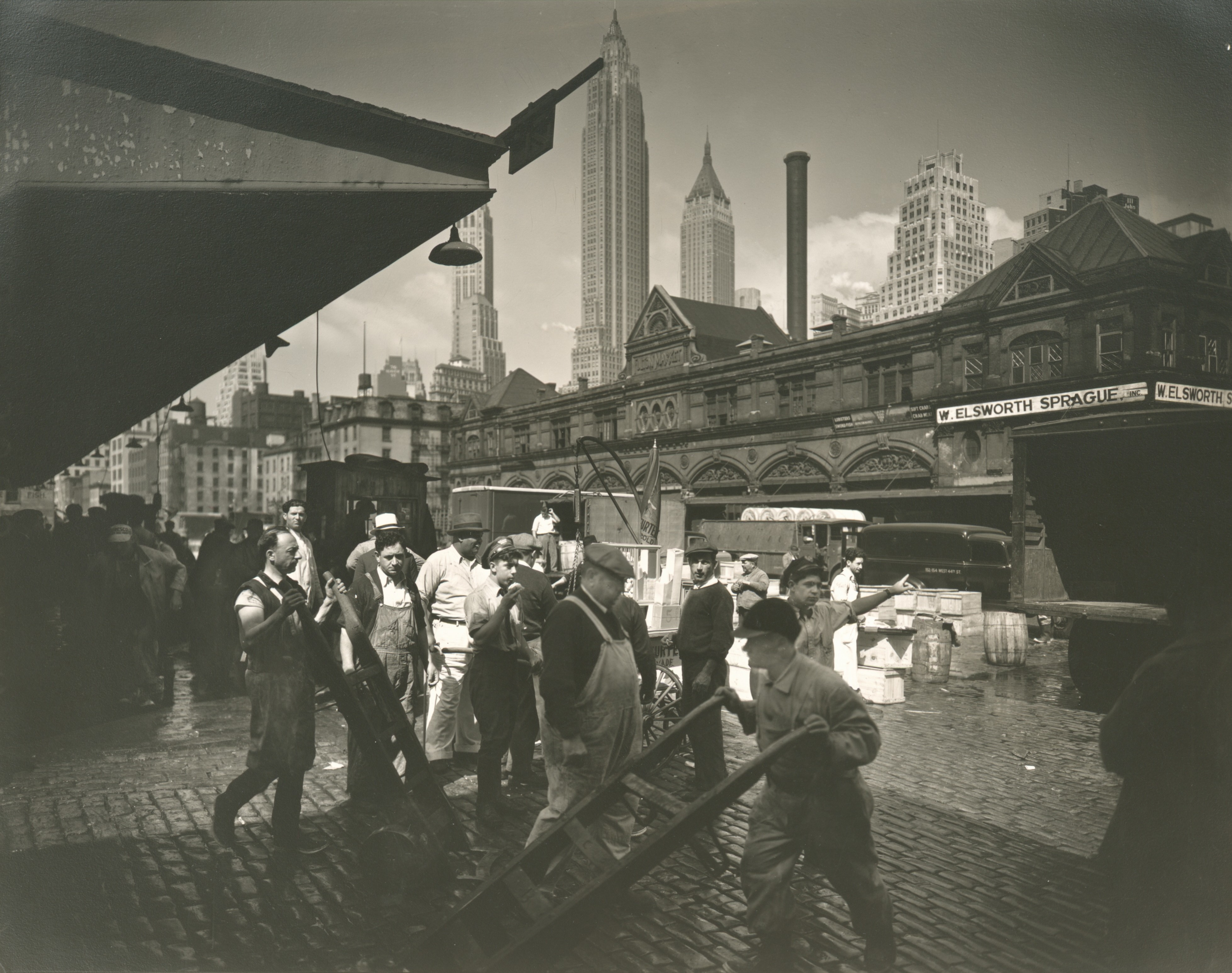
Fulton Street Fish Market, 1936

The Fulton Fish Market was one of New York's earliest open-air fish markets. From a New York newspaper dated 1831:

In New York, there are a number of Markets. Those called Fulton and Washington Markets are the largest. Fulton Market is at the East end of Fulton Street near the East River ... The first was formerly situated in Maiden Lane on the East River side, and was called Fly Market.

The Fulton Fish Market initially served primarily housekeepers from the surrounding areas and Brooklyn. However, by 1850, wholesalers had become the main buyers as the market gained in prominence. One of the oldest fish markets in the United States, the Fulton Fish Market is 17 years younger than the oldest fish market in the country, the Maine Avenue Fish Market in Washington, D.C. The Fulton Market was claimed to be the oldest in continuous operation in one place (since 1822) until it was relocated in 2005. The Maine Avenue Market in D.C. (since 1805, in various incarnations) is now considered the oldest continuously operating open-air market that still survives on the East Coast. However, the Fulton Fish Market is the oldest institution that still retains a primarily wholesale function; although its original public market on South Street is now closed.

=== Organized crime ===
During most of the 20th century the market was associated with one or more New York Mafia families. In 1988, the U.S. Attorney's Office filed a suit under federal racketeering laws to appoint a trustee to run the market. A trustee was appointed, but the extent to which he was able to limit organized crime influence was limited. Since 2001, the market has been regulated by the City of New York's Business Integrity Commission in an effort to eliminate organized crime influence.

=== New Bronx facility ===
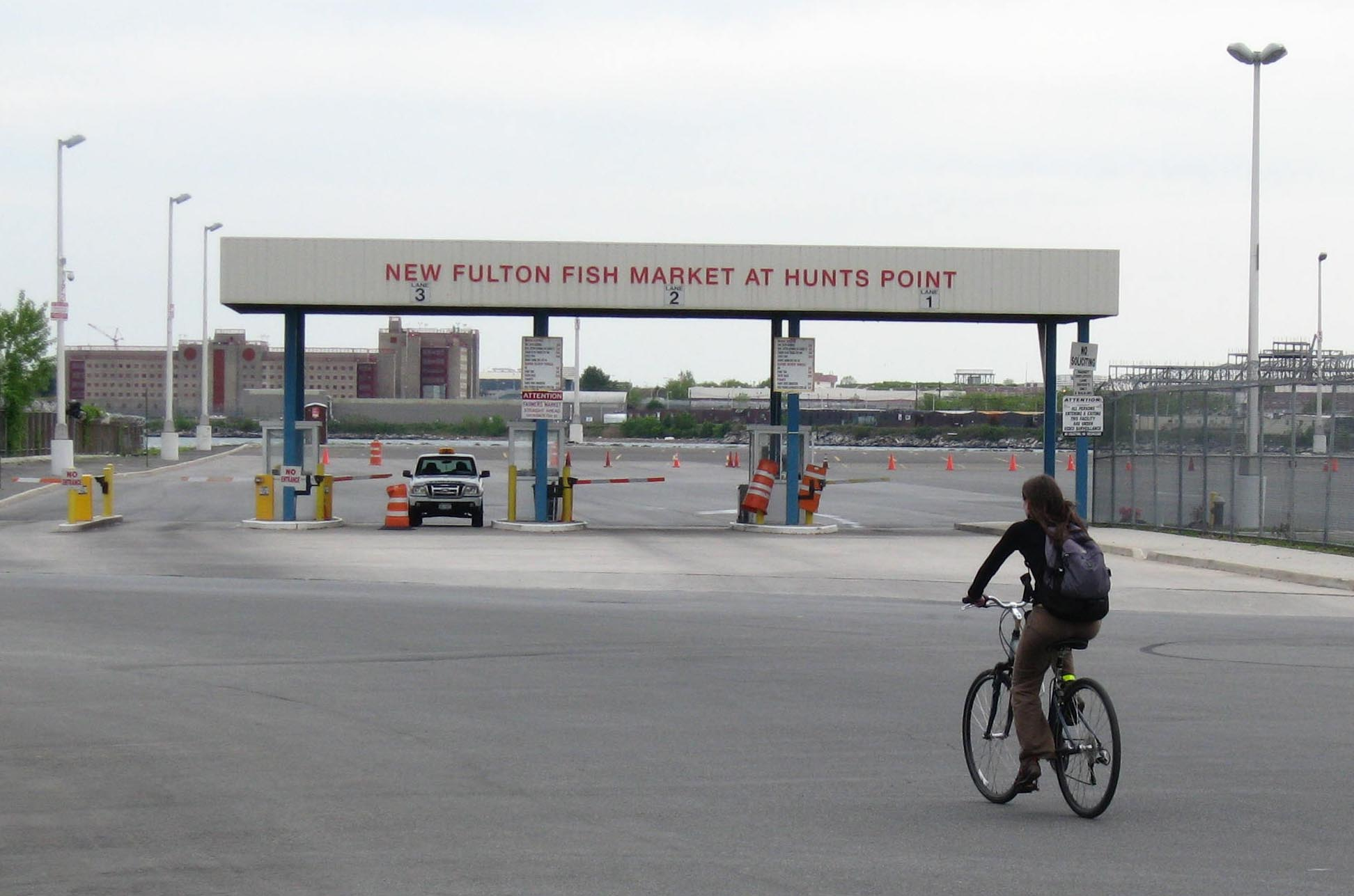
Entrance gate

On November 14, 2005, nearly four years after construction on the $85 million facility began, the Market opened at its Bronx location. The move had been delayed due to legal problems. The last-minute dispute was between a company which had had a ten-year monopoly on delivering fish from trucks to individual sellers' stalls, versus the cooperative of sellers who wanted to do the task themselves in the new building. When the feuding parties agreed to continue as they had been for another three years, the last obstacle to the move was removed and packing began.

The move from the historic Manhattan site was due to a number of factors:

- cramped location
- lack of modern amenities, such as climate control
- increasing real estate value of Manhattan site for retail and residential use
- redevelopment pressure due to desirable proximity to the South Street Seaport and the Fulton Street/East River area

The move brought 650 workers from the market's former location into the Bronx, with an additional 5,500 diesel truck trips through Hunts Point per week (according to the NY Metropolitan Transportation Council) – bringing the weekly total to 60,000. The facility generates over $1 billion in yearly revenue, and allows seafood distributors to store their goods in temperature controlled warehouses with easier transportation access due to its proximity to the Bruckner Expressway. The 400,000-square-foot (37,000 m^{2}) facility has better access to major highways in Hunts Point, but does not utilize the nearby LaGuardia Airport in Queens.

In 2012, the market handled 200 million pounds (91,000,000 kg) of fish annually, at an estimated value of $1 billion.

== Academic research ==
The Fulton Fish Market has been of interest to economists as a case study in imperfect competition, despite being a highly centralized market with a large number of well-informed buyers and sellers. Using 1992 data, Kathryn Graddy (1995, 2006) found that third-degree price discrimination arose in the Fulton market. In particular, Asian customers, who were generally more price elastic, were quoted lower prices than white buyers, by 6.3 cents on average. Graddy (1995, 2006) attributes this to the different markets served by Asian and white buyers. Asian buyers were more likely to resell fish whole to retail and fry shops in poorer neighbourhoods, or sell to establishments in Chinatown where the restaurant sector was highly competitive. They therefore had less scope to pass on prices to their customers than white buyers, who were more likely to resell to less elastic customers.

Fulton Fish Market data has also been used to illustrate advances to instrumental variable methods in econometrics.

== Media references ==
=== Music ===
- The 33 LP Album by James Late called Fulton Fish Market .

=== Television ===
- As a follow-up to the trio of BBC 2 documentaries entitled The London Markets, the fish merchant Roger Barton appears as the central figure in a further series of documentaries entitled World's Greatest Food Markets. These were broadcast in the UK, Autumn 2014. In the first episode he competes commercially with his Bronx contemporaries in the New Fulton Fish Market.
- Bx46 is a documentary about the Fulton Fish Market.

=== Books ===
- Old Mr. Flood by writer Joseph Mitchell takes place in and around the Fulton Fish Market of the 1940s.
