= Brandeis School of Business and Economics =

Coordinates: 42°21′52.9″N 71°15′52.5″W

- Former name: Brandeis International Business School (IBS)
- Type: Private
- Established: 1994
- Affiliations: Brandeis University
- Dean: Linda T.M. Bui
- Faculty: 79
- Students: 317
- Location: Waltham, Massachusetts, United States
- Nationalities Represented: 40
- Website: www.brandeis.edu/global

The Brandeis School of Business and Economics (formerly Brandeis International Business School) offers graduate and undergraduate degree programs in business, finance and economics as part of Brandeis University, located in Waltham, Massachusetts.

Founded by Peter Petri in 2007, Bruce R. Magid served as dean of the school from 2007 to 2016, with Peter Petri serving as interim dean from 2016 to 2018. Kathryn Graddy was appointed dean in 2018, followed by Linda T.M. Bui in 2025 as they began to move away from their international approach to curriculum construction.

== History ==
Brandeis University, the parent institution of the Brandeis School of Business and Economics, was founded in 1948. Brandeis School of Business and Economics was first established as the Graduate School of International Economics and Finance (GSIEF), reflecting increased student enrollment in economics and finance courses, and the creation of the PhD in International Economics and Finance in 1994. In 1998, the MBA and Master of Science in Finance (MSF) programs were added, broadening the scope of the school's teaching and research.

The school was renamed Brandeis International Business School in 2003. In the summer of 2025, Brandeis International Business School was renamed the School of Business and Economics.

== Global Focus ==
Study Abroad

For one semester during the spring or fall, students have the option to study abroad in one of 19 universities in 16 different countries.

Some Global Partner Universities include:

- European Business School (Oestrich-Winkel, Germany)
- EADA (Barcelona, Spain)
- ESSEC (Cergy-Pontoise, France)
- Instituto Tecnológico Autónomo de México (Mexico City, Mexico)
- University of Maastricht (Maatricht, Netherlands)
- University of Cape Town (Cape Town, South Africa)
- Universidad de Chile - FEN (Santiago, Chile)
- Tel Aviv University (Tel Aviv, Israel)
- Waseda University (Tokyo, Japan)
- Yonsei University (Seoul, Korea)

== See also ==
- List of United States business school rankings
- List of business schools in the United States
