= Intensive gathering =

Pre-agricultural practice

Intensive gathering describes the tending-to of edible wild plants to assure their continuous availability at known, convenient locales. Intensive gathering methods include weeding, discouraging predators, pot-irrigation, and limited harvesting to ensure reproduction. The same system of methods is involved in cultivation, a process which additionally requires systematic soil preparation and planting to tending and harvesting. This human manipulation ultimately results in the domestication of involved plant life.

Intensive gathering results in a higher total yield but at a lower efficiency compared to a highly mobile hunter-gatherer lifestyle. Thus, intensive gathering is a product of sedentism and increased population density. Intensive gathering of plant foods at the expense of hunting large game, which was becoming scarcer as population density increased, was common worldwide in the two millennia preceding agriculture. Archeological evidence of intensive gathering includes marked increases in the frequency of particular or groups of taxa relative to prior periods or nearby regions within the same period and bags of several thousand seeds.

== Examples ==
The limited and poor-quality nut resources of California's lower Sacramento Valley motivated the peoples living there to practice intensive gathering of Brodiaeoideae corms and small seeds, especially goosefoot seeds, by at least 2500 BP. Intensive gathering of small seeds was adopted elsewhere in central California in around 1,000 BP as population densities reached the higher capacities of more nut-rich areas. Small-seed production was increased by the invention of the seed beater, by expanding the gathering season to include unripe seeds, by managed burning of stands, and by cultivation and ultimately domestication.

During the early Bronze Age, in the Samara river valley and possibly other parts of the south Russian steppes, pastoralism was practiced alongside intensive gathering, which was replaced by agriculture only in the Iron Age.

== See also ==
- History of agriculture
- Neolithic Revolution
