= Mark Blaug =

British economist (1927–2011)

Mark Blaug FBA
- Born: Norbert Blauaug; 3 April 1927; The Hague, Netherlands
- Died: 18 November 2011 (aged 84); Peter Tavy, Devon, United Kingdom

Academic background
- Education: Columbia University
- Influences: George Stigler

Academic work
- Discipline: Economist
- Institutions: University of Buckingham
- Awards: Fellow of the British Academy (FBA)

Mark Blaug FBA (/blɔːɡ/; 3 April 1927 – 18 November 2011) was a Dutch-born British economist (naturalised in 1982), who covered a broad range of topics during his long career.

He was married to Ruth Towse.

== Life and work ==
Blaug was born on 3 April 1927 in The Hague as Norbert Blauaug into a Jewish family. His family fled to England in 1940. In 1955 Blaug received his PhD from Columbia University in New York under the supervision of George Stigler. Besides shorter periods in public service and in international organisations he has held academic appointments in – among others – Yale University, the University of London, the London School of Economics, the University of Exeter and the University of Buckingham. He was visiting professor in the Netherlands, University of Amsterdam and Erasmus University in Rotterdam, where he was also co-director of CHIMES (Center for History in Management and Economics).

Mark Blaug made far reaching contributions to a range of topics in economic thought throughout his career. Apart from valuable contributions to the economics of art and the economics of education, he is best known for his work in history of economic thought and the methodology of economics.

He died on 18 November 2011 in Peter Tavy, Devon.

== Honours ==
- In 1984 he was made a Foreign Member of the Royal Netherlands Academy of Arts and Sciences (KNAW).
- In 1988 he was made a Distinguished Fellow of the History of Economics Society.
- In 1989 he became an Elected Fellow of the British Academy.

== Selected publications ==
=== Books ===
- Blaug, Mark (1958). Ricardian economics: a historical study (volume 8 of Yale studies in economics) (1st ed.). New Haven, Conn.: Yale University Press.

Reprinted as: Blaug, Mark (2012). Ricardian economics: a historical study (volume 8 of Yale studies in economics). Whitefish, MT: Literary Licensing, LLC. ISBN 9781258447861.
Review: Spiegel, Henry W. (January 1959). "Ricardian economics: a historical study (book review)". The Annals of the American Academy of Political and Social Science. 321 (1): 197–198. doi:10.1177/000271625932100176. S2CID 145396784.

- Blaug, Mark (1962). Economic theory in retrospect (1st ed.). Cambridge New York: Cambridge University Press.

Revised as: Blaug, Mark (1997). Economic theory in retrospect (5th ed.). Cambridge New York: Cambridge University Press. ISBN 9780521577014 – via Internet Archive.
Preview.

- Blaug, Mark (1974). The Cambridge Revolution: Success or Failure? (1st ed.). London: Institute of Economic Affairs. ISBN 9780255360623.
- Blaug, Mark (1980). The methodology of economics, or, How economists explain. Cambridge England New York: Cambridge University Press. ISBN 9780521294379.

Revised as: Blaug, Mark (1992). The methodology of economics, or, how economists explain. Cambridge New York, NY: Cambridge University Press. ISBN 9780521436786 – via Internet Archive.
Preview.

- Blaug, Mark (1985). Great economists since Keynes: an introduction to the lives & works of one hundred modern economists. Brighton: Wheatsheaf. ISBN 9781858986920.

Revised as: Blaug, Mark (1998). Great economists since Keynes: an introduction to the lives & works of one hundred modern economists (2nd ed.). Cheltenham, Glos, UK; Northampton, MA, USA: Edward Elgar – via Internet Archive.

- Blaug, Mark (1986). Economic history and the history of economics. Brighton: Wheatsheaf. ISBN 9780745001302 – via Internet Archive.
- Blaug, Mark (1986). Great economists before Keynes: an introduction to the lives & works of one hundred great economists of the past. Brighton: Wheatsheaf. ISBN 9780745001609.
- Blaug, Mark (1990). Economic theories, true or false?: essays in the history and methodology of economics. Aldershot, Hants, England Brookfield, Vt., USA: Edward Elgar Publishing Gower Publishing Co. ISBN 9781852783761.
- Blaug, Mark; de Marchi, Neil (1991). Appraising economic theories : studies in the methodology of research programs. Aldershot, Hants, England Brookfield, Vermont, US: Edward Elgar Publishing Co. ISBN 9781852785154.
- Blaug, Mark (1997). Not only an economist: recent essays by Mark Blaug. Cheltenham, UK Brookfield, Vermont, US: Edward Elgar Publishing Co. ISBN 9781858984551.
- Blaug, Mark; Sturges, Rodney P. (1999). Who's who in economics. Cheltenham, UK Northampton, MA: Edward Elgar Publishing. ISBN 9781858988863.

=== Chapters in books ===
- Sen, Amartya (2012), "Development as capability expansion", in Saegert, Susan; DeFilippis, James (eds.), The community development reader, New York: Routledge, ISBN 9780415507769
- Blaug, Mark (2005), "The social sciences: economics (volume 27)", in Goetz, Philip W.; MacHenry, Robert; Hoiberg, Dale H. (eds.), The New Encyclopædia Britannica (15th ed.), Chicago: Encyclopædia Britannica, pp. 343–352, ISBN 9781593392369

=== Journal articles ===
- Blaug, Mark (June 1963). "The Myth of the Old Poor Law and the Making of the New" (PDF). The Journal of Economic History. 23 (2): 151–184. doi:10.1017/S0022050700103808. JSTOR 2116435.
- Blaug, Mark (June 1964). "The Poor Law Report Reexamined" (PDF). The Journal of Economic History. 24 (2): 229–245. doi:10.1017/S0022050700060502. JSTOR 2115861.
- Blaug, Mark (May–June 1998). "Disturbing currents in modern economics". Challenge. 41 (3): 11–34. doi:10.1080/05775132.1998.11472030. JSTOR 40721829.
- Blaug, Mark (Summer 2000). "Henry George: rebel with a cause" (PDF). The European Journal of the History of Economic Thought. 7 (2): 270–288. doi:10.1080/096725600361816.
- Blaug, Mark (Winter 2001). "No History of Ideas, Please, We're Economists" (PDF). Journal of Economic Perspectives. 15 (1): 145–164. doi:10.1257/jep.15.1.145. JSTOR 2696545.

=== Anthologies ===
- 'Pioneers in Economics'. In 1991 and 1992 Blaug edited a series of fifty volumes, with reprints of journal articles on the history of economic thought, under the series title 'Pioneers in Economics'. The series was published by Edward Elgar Publishing.
