= Journal of Cultural Economics =

- Discipline: Economics
- Language: English
- Edited by: Federico Etro, Douglas Noonan

Publication details
- History: 1977–present
- Publisher: Springer Science+Business Media
- Frequency: Quarterly
- Impact factor: 2.9 (2024)

Standard abbreviations
- ISO 4: J. Cult. Econ.

Indexing
- ISSN: 0885-2545 (print); 1573-6997 (web)
- JSTOR: 08852545

Links
- Journal homepage; Online access

The Journal of Cultural Economics is a quarterly peer-reviewed academic journal covering research on the economics of the arts and literature. It was established in 1977 and is published by Springer Science+Business Media in cooperation with the Association for Cultural Economics International. The editors-in-chief are Federico Etro (University of Florence) and Douglas Noonan (Indiana University). The journal applies theoretical and empirical methods to the study of artistic production and innovation, the structure of markets for the provision of cultural goods, the evolution of cultural institutions, and the political economy of cultural policy. It also publishes interdisciplinary works related to other social sciences and art history.

== Abstracting and indexing ==
The journal is abstracted and indexed in:

- RePEc
- Scopus
- Social Sciences Citation Index

According to the Journal Citation Reports, the journal has a 2024 5-year impact factor of 2.9.

== See also ==
- List of economics journals
