= Economics of the arts and literature =

Branch of economics

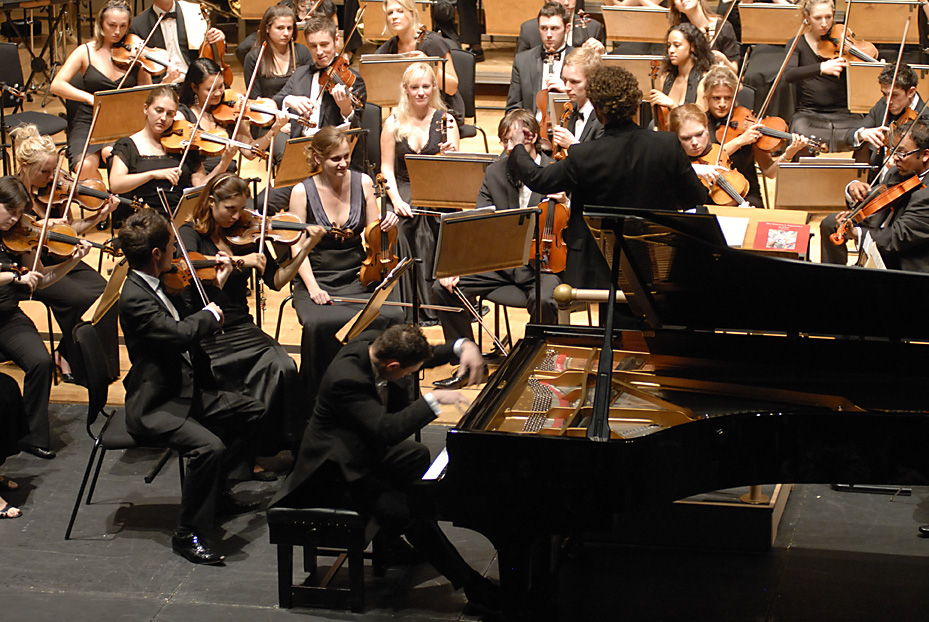
A concert pianist playing a piano concerto with a full orchestra. Orchestras are one of the largest musical ensembles, as they can contain as many as 100 musicians. In the 2010s, most orchestras receive income from ticket sales, donations and government funding. The latter two sources of income are required because ticket sales alone do not provide enough income for most groups.

Economics of the arts and literature or cultural economics (used below for convenience) is a branch of economics that studies the economics of creation, distribution, and the consumption of works of art, literature and similar creative and/or cultural products. For a long time, the concept of the "arts" were confined to visual arts (e.g., painting) and performing arts (music, theatre, dance) in the Anglo-Saxon tradition. Usage has widened since the beginning of the 1980s with the study of cultural industry (cinema, television programs, book and periodical publishing and music publishing) and the economy of cultural institutions (museums, libraries, historic buildings). The field is coded as JEL: Z11 in the Journal of Economic Literature classification system used for article searches.

== Introduction ==
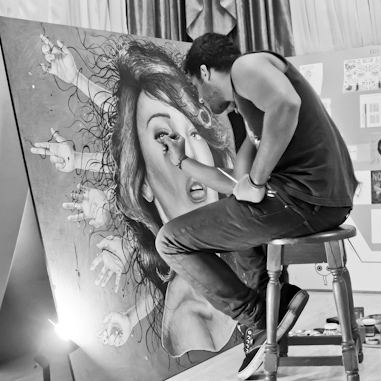
Painter Alejandro Plaza at work on a canvas. Once this painting is complete, it will be a unique good, for which there is no exact substitute

Cultural economics is concerned with the arts in a broad sense. The goods considered have creative content, but that is not enough to qualify as a cultural good. Designer goods such as clothes and drapes are not considered usually to be works of art or culture. Cultural goods are those with a value determined by symbolic content rather than physical characteristics. (For further considerations, see also Cultural Institutions Studies). Economic thinking has been applied in ever more areas in the last decennia, including pollution, corruption and education.

Works of art and culture have a specific quality, which is their uniqueness. While other economic goods, such as crude oil or wheat are generic, interchangeable commodities (given a specific grade of the product), there is only one example of a famous painting such as the Mona Lisa, and only one example of Rodin's well-known sculpture The Thinker. While copies or reproductions can be made of these works of art, and while many inexpensive posters of the Mona Lisa and small factory-made replicas of The Thinker are sold, neither full-size copies nor inexpensive reproductions are viewed as substitutes for the real artworks, in the way that a consumer views a pound of Grade A sugar from Cuba as a fully equivalent substitute for a pound of Grade A sugar from United States or Dominican Republic. As there is no equivalent item or substitute for these famous works of art, classical economist Adam Smith held it was impossible to value them. Alfred Marshall noted that the demand for a certain kind of cultural good can depend on its consumption: The more you have listened to a particular kind of music, the more you appreciate. In his economic framework, these goods do not have the usual decreasing marginal utility.

Key academic works in cultural economics include those of Baumol and Bowen (Performing Arts, The Economic Dilemma, 1966), of Gary Becker on addictive goods, and of Alan T. Peacock (public choice). This summary has been divided into sections on the economic study of the performing arts, on the market of individual pieces of art, the art market in cultural industries, the economics of cultural heritage and the labour market in the art sector.

== Performing arts: Baumol and cultural economics ==
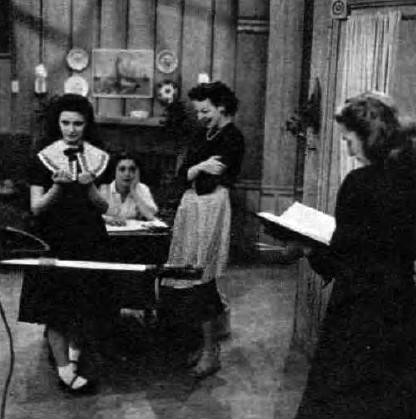
Actors rehearsing for a play in 1951. Despite the numerous technological advances in between 1951 and the 2010s, in the 2010s, it would still require the same number of actors to perform this play. For this reason, scholars argue that some cultural industries are not getting more efficient the way other industries, such as accounting and banking, are; these latter two industries require far fewer workers in the 2010s due to the development of computer programs.

The seminal paper by William Baumol and Bowen introduced the term cost disease for a relative cost growth of live performances. This cost growth explains the increasing dependency of this kind of art on state subsidies. It occurs when the consumable good is labour itself. To understand this phenomenon, compare the change in the cost of performing the Molière play Tartuffe in 1664 and in 2007 with the change in cost of calculating a large number of sums from an accounting ledger. In 1664, you needed two hours and twelve actors to perform Molière's play, and it would take, say, twelve accountants working for two hours to add up all the sums in an accounting ledger. In 2007, a single accountant with a $10 calculator can add the sums in 20 minutes, but you still need two hours and twelve actors for the Molière play. Artists must make a considerable investment in human capital (e.g., training), and needs to be paid accordingly. The artists' pay needs to rise along with that of the population in general. As the latter is following the general productivity in the economy, the cost of a play will rise with general productivity, while the actors' productivity does not rise.

There are two lines of thought in subsequent literature on the economics of the performing arts:

- The first concentrates on the existence of productivity growth in some areas of production, thus contradicting the relevance of cost disease. Staying with the "Tartuffe" example, the same performance can be viewed by an ever-larger audience by improvements in the design of theatres, and by the introduction of microphones, television and recording.
- The second is concerned with the allocation of subsidies to the cultural sector. While these should be in the general public interest, they may have an income distribution effect, e.g. if they reduce cost to the relatively well-off part of society. This is the case when the well-off are overrepresented in the audiences of subsidized plays, or when subsidies go to a small elitist group of artists.

== Market for artworks ==
Two segments of the market in the visual arts can be distinguished: works of art that are familiar and have a history, and contemporary works that are more easily influenced by fashion and new discoveries. Both markets, however, are oligopolistic, i.e., there are limited numbers of sellers and buyers (oligopsony). Two central questions on the working of the markets are: How are prices determined, and what is the return on artworks, compared to the return on financial assets.

=== Price determination ===
Price formation of artworks poses a unique economic challenge due to an inherent heterogeneity, low substitutability and scarcity of pieces of art. Hence, art prices are unanchored in production costs or reciprocal responses of supply and demand. Rather, price of art is governed by an interplay of scarcity, taste and cultural value, leading the prices to a lack of convergence toward long-term equilibrium. Thus, economists employ two distinct methods for the estimation and analysis of art prices: hedonic regression and repeated sales regression analyses.

==== Hedonic regression ====
Lancaster (1966) proposed that utility derived from a given good is contingent upon its characteristics, rather than on the good per se. Hedonic regression represents an analytical implementation of Lancastrian preferences, allowing for an estimation of implicit prices of specific observable characteritics of heterogeneous goods. The functional form of a hedonic pricing models is, as follows:

$P_i = {\beta}_0+\Sigma^J_{j=1}\beta_jx_{i,j}+\Sigma^T_{t=1}\gamma_tY_{i,t}+\epsilon_i$

Where $P_i$ denotes the price of an item $i$, $x_{i,j}$ represents a certain characteristic of the item and $Y_{i,t}$ is a time dummy variable controlling for exogenous factors affecting the pricing of artworks across distinct time periods, such as economic conditions and shifts in tastes.

The table below presents the characteristics frequently employed in hedonic regression models.

Category	Characteristics
Artworks	authenticity, color, dimensions, history of the artwork, medium, support, style, technique, topic, year of creation
Artists	age, artist's name, gender, nationality, living status, reputation
Sale	auction house, catalogue, estimate, location, time

==== Repeat-sales regression ====
Repeat-sales methods allow following a certain objects sold in at least two distinct moments in time. These models use the previous sale prices to estimate the fluctuations in value of a piece of art over a certain time period. Thus constructed price index is based solely on previously fetched prices, eliminating the need to select and quantify individual characteristics of artworks. Yet, as the index is constructed for multiple sales, it significantly limits the sample and falls prey to selection bias.

=== Art market and investment ===
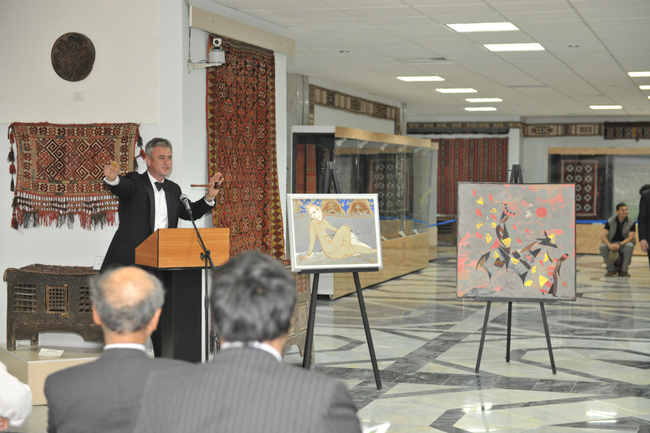
Fine art such as paintings are typically sold at auctions.

Some major financial institutions, banks and insurance companies, have had considerable return rates on investments in art works in the 1990s. These rates have not slowed down at the same time as the rates on international exchange markets, in the early 1990s. This may indicate a diversification opportunity to invest in tangible assets such as art works. Apart from this evidence of successful investment, the amount of data available has stimulated study of the market. Many works are sold at auctions. These transactions are thus very transparent. This has made it possible to establish price databases, with prices of some items going back to 1652. An intangible gain in terms of pleasure of having a work of art could explain this partly. However, before interpreting the figures, it should be borne in mind that art is often exempt of many kinds of taxes. In 1986, Baumol made an estimate of an average yearly rate of return of 0.55 percent for works of art, against a rate of return of 2.5 percent for financial assets, over a 20-year period.

=== Legal criticism ===
Throughout many art auctions, the source of the money of the bidder is often hard to identify or the works are purchased by an anonymous buyer.

Law enforcement officials say that the high amount of secrecy has become a drawback, as it leaves the process available to money launderers. According to the FBI and Interpol, “in comparison with other trade sectors, the art market faces a higher risk of exposure to dubious financial practices” because “the volume of legally questionable transactions is noticeably higher than in other global markets.”

== Cultural industries ==
Some famous artworks such as the Mona Lisa painting are not reproducible (at least in the sense of creating another copy that would be seen as equivalent in value), but there are many cultural goods whose value does not depend on a single, individual copy. Books, recordings, movies get some of their value from the existence of many copies of the original. These are the products of major cultural industries, which are the book industry, the music industry and the film industry. These markets are characterized by:

- Uncertainty of value. The demand for a good (market success) is hard to predict. For example, with movies, even if a film's plot, themes and selection of actors has been extensively tested using focus groups and polls, and even if the movie uses popular A-list actors, this film may still be a box office bomb (e.g., Gigli, a 2003 American romantic comedy starring Ben Affleck and Jennifer Lopez). On the other hand, a low-budget film by an unknown director and an unknown cast, such as The Blair Witch Project can surprise the industry by being a major hit. This uncertainty is a characteristic of an experience good such as films, TV shows, musical theatre shows and music concerts.
- Infinite variety. You can differentiate between regular consumer products, e.g. cars, on basis of its characteristics. For example, a hatchback can be purchased from a number of manufacturers with a set list of options (e.g., automatic transmission, standard transmission, convertible, etc.), with the different options requiring different charges. Many general products allow classification on a relatively small number of such characteristics. Cultural goods, however, have a very high number of characteristics, which, on top of that, often are subjective. For example, an early 1990s band with loud, distorted electric guitar could be considered to be grunge, punk, heavy metal music or alternative rock by different music critics. This makes cultural products hard to compare.
- High concentration in the products which are traded or sold. A major part of the sales of cultural goods is concentrated in a very small number of bestsellers (e.g., with books), blockbusters (movies) or hit singles (pop music). In other words, the market for such cultural goods operates as a winner-take-all market.
- Short life cycle. Most cultural items are sold/traded shortly after their introduction or production. Some cultural goods, such as broadcast news, have little or no market value shortly after the broadcast. Of course, some cultural products may retain saleability for years or even decades, as with the small number of films that become cult movies (e.g., Rocky Horror Picture Show) or certain classic novels or albums that have enduring appeal (the "back catalogue" of a record label).
- High fixed costs. There is high cost before introduction of a new artwork or cultural product. Making a movie can cost millions of dollars; however the marginal cost of making an additional copy of the DVD may cost less than a dollar.

=== Market structure ===
The important cultural industries tend to have an oligopolistic market structure. The market is dominated by a few major companies, with the rest of the market consisting of many small companies. The latter may act as a filter or as "gatekeepers" for the artistic supply. A small company with a successful artist or good quality roster can be bought by one of the major companies. Big conglomerates, pooling TV and film production, have existed for decades. The 1990s have seen some mergers extending beyond the industry as such, and mergers of hardware producers with content providers. Anticipated gains from synergy and market power have not been realised, and from the early 2000s there has been a trend towards organisation along sector lines.

== Economics of cultural heritage ==
Cultural heritage is reflected in goods and real estate. Management and regulation of museums has come under study in this area.

=== UNESCO World Heritage Sites ===
The World Heritage Convention (Convention Concerning the Protection of the World Cultural and Natural Heritage) is an agreement adopted during the 1972 General Conference of UNESCO. State Parties who have adhered to the convention nominate heritage sites as World Heritage Sites, and receive financial support from the World Heritage Fund for the conservation and protection of their sites, preparatory assistance for the nomination of sites, training activities, technical cooperation, emergency assistance, or promotional and educational activities. Funding is prioritised for State Parties that have sites on the World Heritage List and List of World Heritage in Danger.

The World Heritage Fund (The Fund for the Protection of the World Cultural and Natural Heritage of Outstanding Universal Value) was established in 1977 under Article 15 of the World Heritage Convention. Contributions to the fund are made by the State Parties who have agreed to the Convention, either assessed compulsory or voluntary contributions.

=== Museums ===
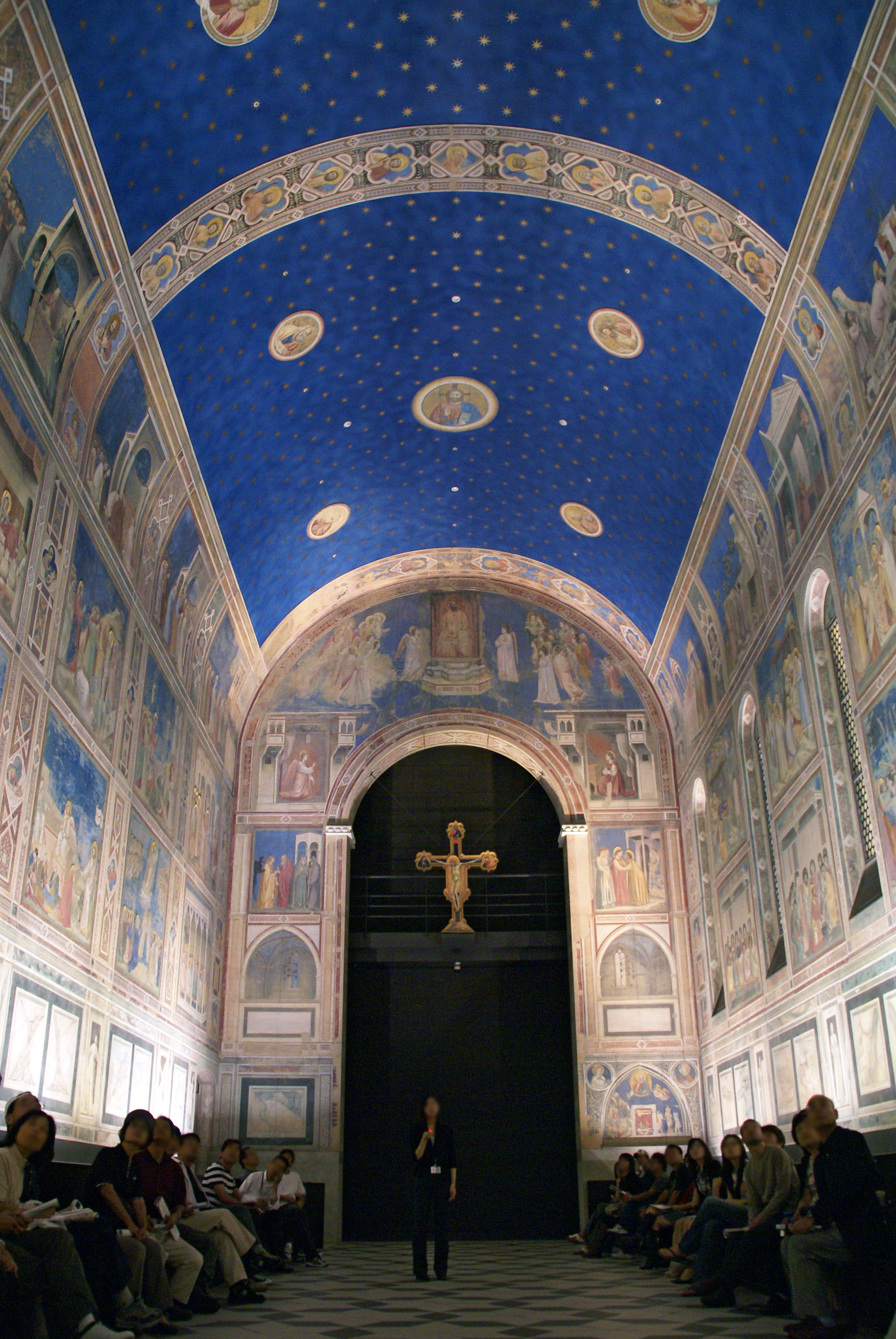
The Otsuka Museum of Art in Japan.

Museums, which have a conservatory role, and provide exhibitions to the general public, can be commercial, or on a non-profit base. In the second case, as they provide a public good, they pose the problems related to these goods: should they be self-financing, or be subsidized? One of the specific issues is the imbalance between the huge value of the collections in museums, and their budgets. Also, they are often located in places (city centres) where the cost of land is high, which limits their expansion possibilities. American museums exhibit only about half of their collection. Some museums in Europe, like the Pompidou Centre in France, show less than 5 percent of their collection. Apart from providing exhibitions, museums get proceeds from derived products, like catalogues and reproductions. They also produce at a more intangible level: They make collections. Out of so many pieces in the public domain, they make a selection based on their expertise, thus adding value to the mere existence of the items.

The dual goal of conservation and providing exhibitions obviously presents a choice. On one hand the museum has, for conservation reasons, an interest in exhibiting as few items as possible, and it would select lesser known works and a specialized audience, to promote knowledge and research. On the other hand, the exhibition argument requires showing the major pieces from different cultures, to satisfy the demands from the public and to attract a large audience. When a government has made a choice about this, application of economic contract theory will help to implement this choice by showing how to use incentives to different managers (on the financial, conservatory side) to obtain the required result.

=== Real estate and buildings ===
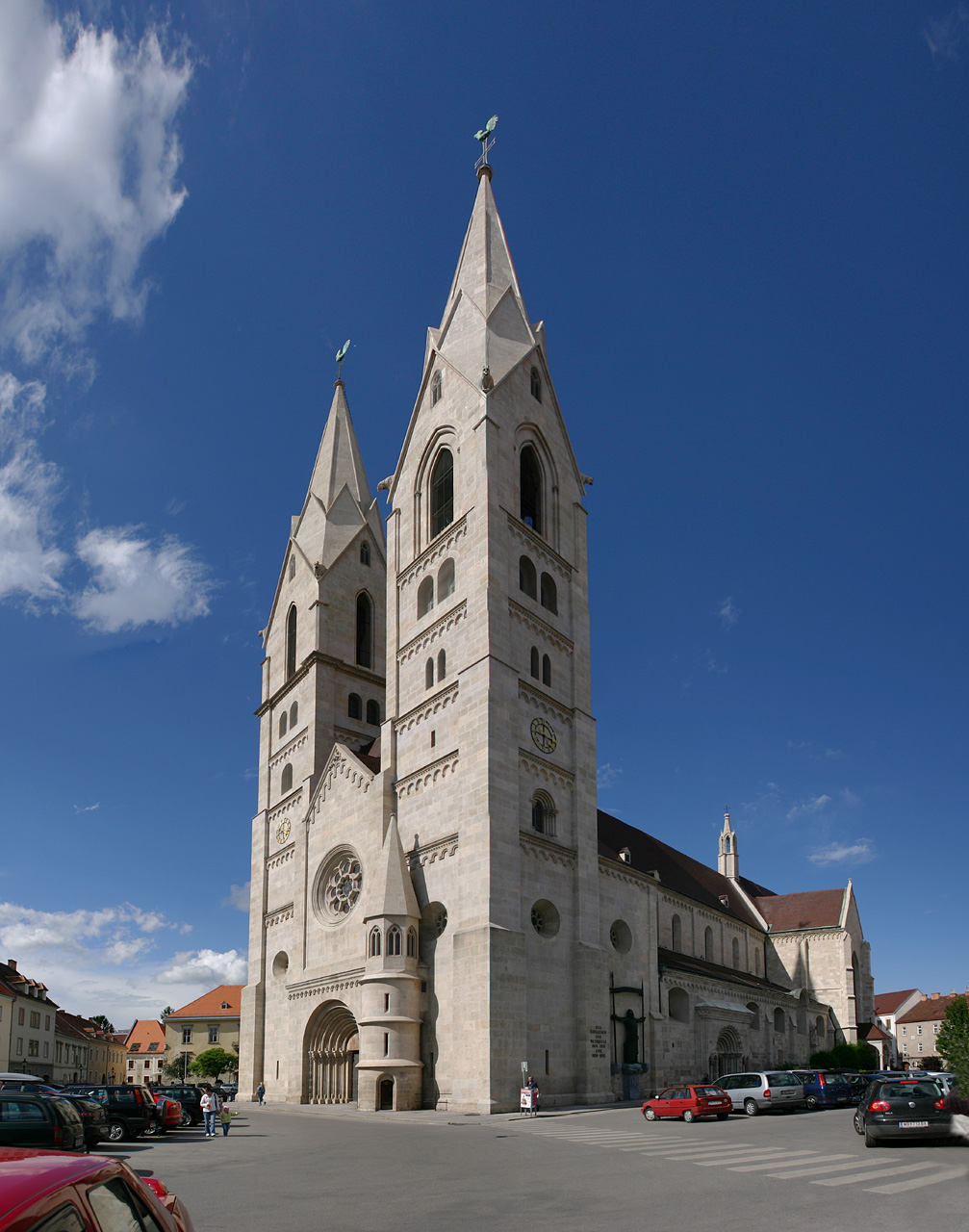
In many countries, historic buildings such as cathedrals are considered to be "heritage buildings" and as such they are protected against demolition or substantial modifications.

Many countries have systems that protect historically significant buildings and structures. These are buildings or other structures that are deemed to have cultural importance or which are deemed to have heritage value. Owners get tax deductions or subsidies for restoration, in return for which they accept restrictions on modifications to the buildings or provide public access. Buildings that are often classified as heritage buildings include former or current Parliament buildings, cathedrals, courthouses, houses built in a recognized historical style, and even fairly regular houses, if the house was formerly the home of a famous politician, artist or inventor. Buildings with heritage status cannot typically be demolished. Depending on the nature of the heritage restrictions, the current owner may or may not be allowed to modify the outside or inside of the building. Such a system poses the same choice problems as museums do. There has been little study of this issue.

== Artists' labour market ==
The labour market for artists is characterized by:

- There is an extremely unequal income distribution within the market segment. A very small group of artists earn a high proportion of the total income, while the average income is low.
- There is a structural excess supply of labour. There are always more people who would like to earn their income as an artist than there is demand for artists and artworks. For example, there are far more young indie rock bands aspiring to careers in music than there are available paid contracts in the recording industry. Due to this excess supply of labour, a nightclub owner has so many local young bands requesting to play at their venue that they can offer the bands little or no payment for their performance.
- There are intangible returns to labour, also called "nonpecuniary benefits" (this means non-financial, non-wage benefits). For example, a musician is able to spend their days creating beautiful music and working with other creative people, which is very satisfying. Due to these intangible returns, artists are often willing to accept lower wages than their qualifications would earn in a different market. For example, working with a famous musician may provide such great intangible benefits (e.g., it is exciting to meet and work with such a well-known performer) that a record producer may be able to ask musicians to record with the start musician for little or no payment.
- Non-separation of artist and work. While some workers in the cultural industries do not make a strong connection between their work tasks and their self-identity, for some types of artists, such as painters, sculptors and filmmakers, the image their artwork or creative output gives them is important to artists' sense of self. Whether this phenomenon occurs depends on a number of factors, such as the type of artistic job and individuals' perceptions. In the 2010s, many famous film directors view the movies they direct as directly identified with their artistic vision. However, an assistant director leading scenes in action films may see themself as a worker in a cultural industry, and they may not feel artistically identified with the films they work on.

=== Star system ===
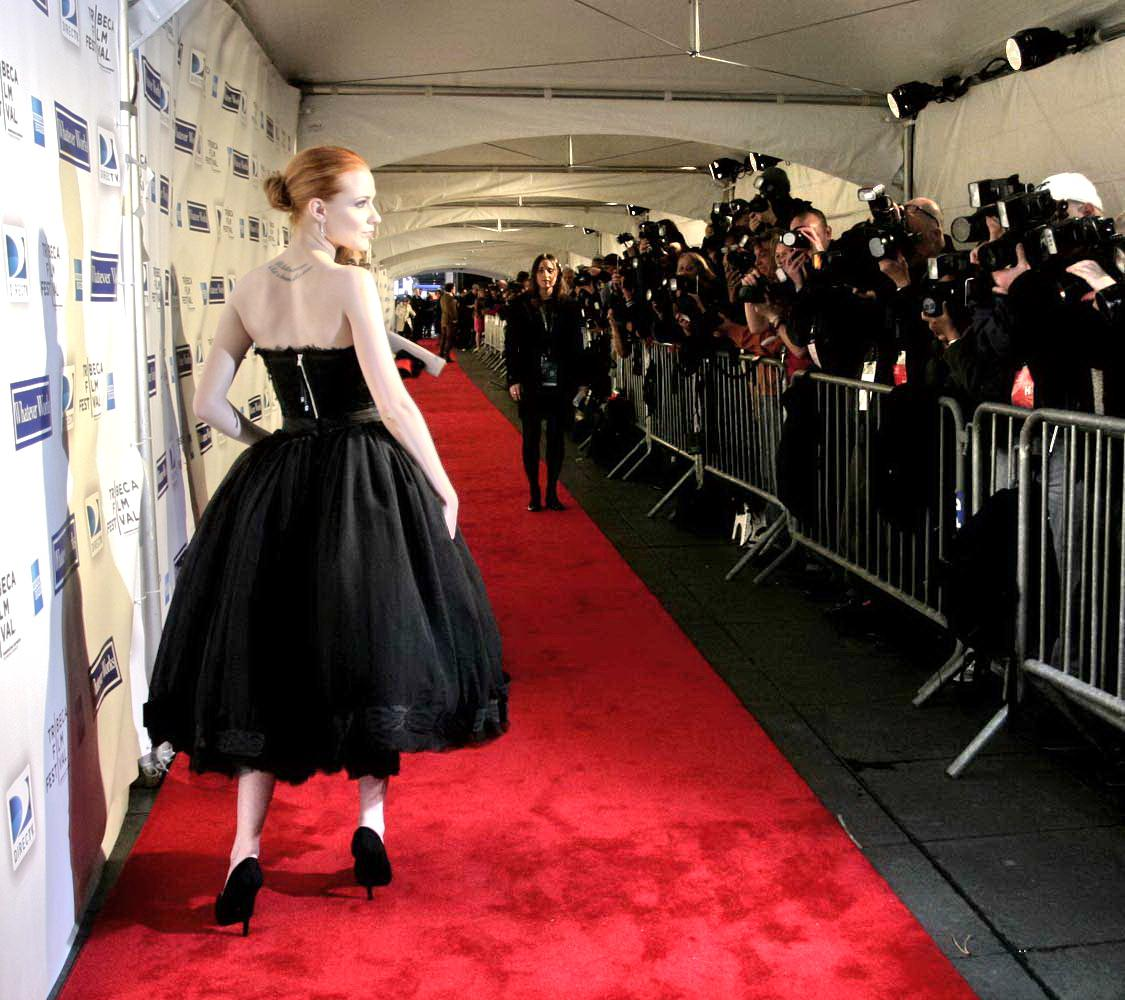
Sherwin Rosen states that top stars have such high earnings because their movies sell more copies

The term "star system", coined by Sherwin Rosen, is used to explain why a small number of the artists and creators in the market, such as the celebrity A-list actors and top pop singers, earn most of the total earnings in a sector. Rosen's 1981 paper examined the economics of superstars to determine why "relatively small numbers of people earn enormous amounts of money and seem to dominate the fields in which they engage". Rosen argues that in superstar markets, "small differences in talent at the top of the distribution will translate into large differences in revenue." Rosen points out that "...sellers of higher talent charge only slightly higher prices than those of lower talent, but sell much larger quantities; their greater earnings come overwhelmingly from selling larger quantities than from charging higher prices".

In cultural industries, the uncertainty about the quality of a product plays a key role in this. The consumer does not really know how good the product is, until they have consumed it (think of a movie), and the producer is confronted with the typical uncertainty in a cultural industry. The consumer looks for guidance in the price, reputation, or a famous name on the cover or poster. As the producer understands this using a famous director, actor or singer affects demand, they are prepared to pay a lot for a name considered a sign of quality (a star). Indeed, authors like Adler and Ginsburgh have given evidence that star status is determined by chance: in a musical contest, results were highly correlated with the order of performance. This randomness has been used to explain why the labor supply in the sector remains excessive: given the extreme gains of a star, and an irrational behaviour, or particular preferences, with respect to chance, unsuccessful artists keep trying, even when they are earning their money mostly in a different trade, such as waiting tables. A second argument is the possibility of intangible returns to artists' labour in terms of social status and lifestyle. For example, even a struggling DJ spends most of their time onstage on nightclubs and raves, which for some people is a desirable outcome.

=== Production structure ===
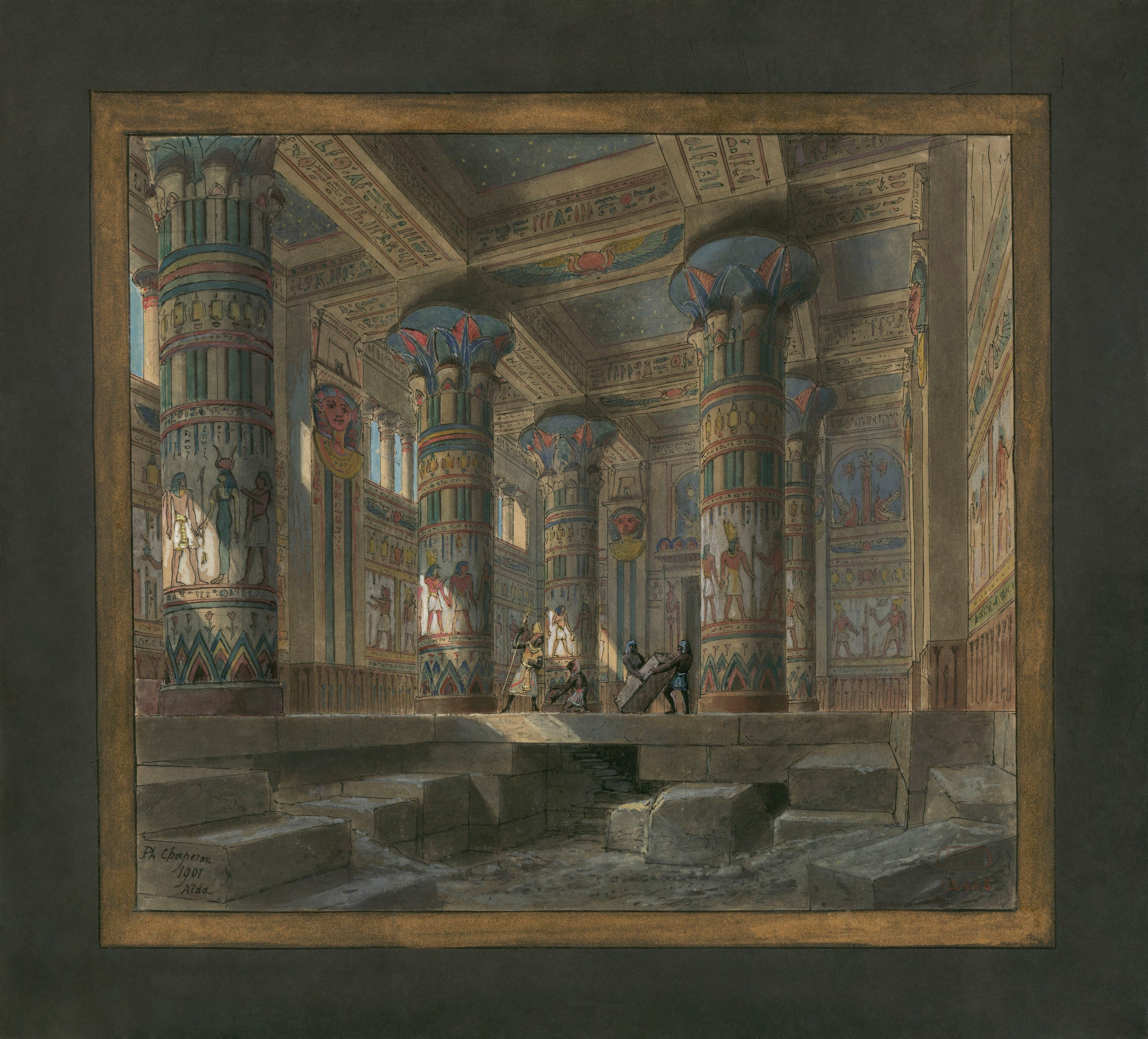
A painter whose canvases hang in major museums and a professional set painter for opera or theatre are both skilled painters who do painting for a living. However, the former is more likely to view their paintings as part of their artistic expression and identity, whereas the latter is more likely to view themself as a craftsperson.

A case has been made for the existence of a different structure in the production of cultural goods . (See Cultural Institutions Studies.) An artist often considers a product to be an expression of themself, while the ordinary craftsperson is only concerned with their product, as far as it affects their pay or salary. For example, a painter who creates artworks that are displayed in museums may view their paintings as their artistic expression. On the other hand, a scene painter for a music theatre company may see themself as a craftsperson who is paid by the hour for doing painting. The artist may thus want restrict the use of their product, and they may object if a museum uses a reproduction of their painting to help sell cars or liquor. On the other hand, the scene painter may not object to commercial re-uses of their set painting, as they may see it just as a regular job.

== Cultural consumption ==
Cultural goods can be distinguished between tangible goods, such as a painting or a book and intangible such as a museum visit or a musical performance, or else experience goods.

Based on top-cited sociology scholars, there are two different approach for the formation of tastes: exogenous and endogenous. According to the exogenous approach, people gain heterogenous utilities by consume culture according to their own accumulation of human and cultural capital. Since cultural goods are experience goods, art consumption stimulates the capability to extract utility by other cultural goods that will be consumed in the future. Individuals, then, learn their own preference structure by consuming cultural goods.

Empirically, the most relevant determinants for cultural consumption are education (consistent with the learning by doing approach) and income. Not all the activities require the same amount of individual cultural capital to be appreciated: some, such as opera or book readings, are enjoyable by those with higher education and capital, while others, such as cinema screenings or popular music concerts, do not require prior effort in accumulating cultural capital to generate utility. As showed by Petersen, the distinction between highbrow-likely and lowbrow-likely profiles of consumers is not clear anymore: while previously higher social classes exploited their highbrow habits to distinguish from lower social classes, now high classes are more likely to attend also lowbrow activities, and exploit their social gain against lower classes by the creation of wide social ties.

== See also ==
- Philosophy of copyright
- Cultural economics
- Journal of Cultural Economics
- The Price of Everything, 2018 documentary on contemporary art valuations
- The Lost Leonardo, 2021 documentary on the 2017 sale of the Salvador Mundi

== Journals ==
- Journal of Cultural Economics and first-page article links from 1977 on.
