= Joshua Angrist =

Israeli–American economist

Joshua Angrist יהושע אנגריסט
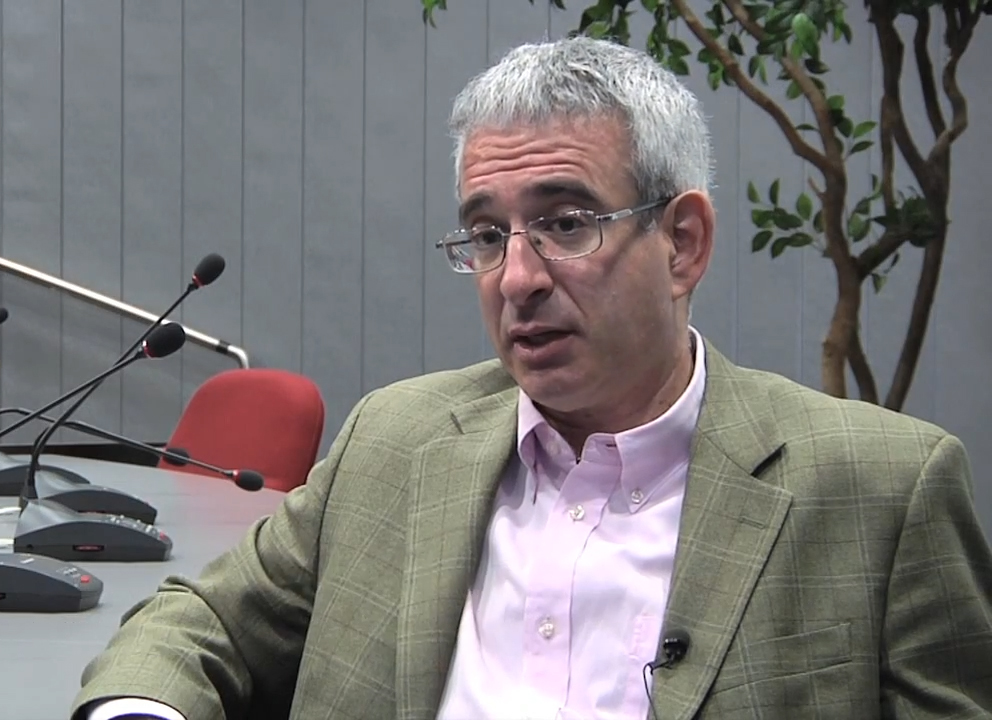
- Angrist in 2011
- Born: September 18, 1960 (age 66); Columbus, Ohio, U.S.

Academic background
- Education: Oberlin College (BA); Princeton University (MA, PhD)
- Thesis: Econometric Analysis of the Vietnam Era Draft Lottery (1989)
- Doctoral advisor: Orley Ashenfelter
- Other advisors: David Card; Whitney Newey

Academic work
- Discipline: Econometrics, labor economics
- Institutions: Massachusetts Institute of Technology
- Doctoral students: Esther Duflo; Jonah B. Gelbach; Melissa Kearney; Jeffrey R. Kling
- Notable ideas: Local average treatment effect
- Awards: Nobel Memorial Prize in Economic Sciences (2021)
- Website: Information at IDEAS / RePEc

Joshua David Angrist (Hebrew: יהושע אנגריסט; born September 18, 1960) is an Israeli American economist and Ford Professor of Economics at the Massachusetts Institute of Technology. Angrist, together with Guido Imbens, was awarded the Nobel Memorial Prize in Economics in 2021 "for their methodological contributions to the analysis of causal relationships".

He ranks among the world's top economists in labor economics, urban economics, econometrics, and the economics of education, and is known for his use of quasi-experimental research designs (such as instrumental variables) to study the effects of public policies and changes in economic or social circumstances. He is a co-founder and co-director of MIT's Blueprint Labs, which researches the relationship between human capital and income inequality in the U.S. He also cofounded Avela, an ed-tech startup that provides application and enrollment-related software and services to school districts, schools of all kinds, organizations like Teach for America, and the U.S. military.

== Biography ==
Angrist was born to a Jewish family in Columbus, Ohio, and raised in Pittsburgh, where he graduated from Taylor Allderdice High School in 1977. Angrist received his B.A. in economics from Oberlin College in 1982. He lived in Israel from 1982 until 1985 and served as a paratrooper in the Israeli Defence Forces. Angrist received an M.A. and a Ph.D. in economics from Princeton University in 1987 and 1989, respectively. His doctoral dissertation, Econometric Analysis of the Vietnam Era Draft Lottery, was supervised by Orley Ashenfelter and later published in parts in the American Economic Review. After completing his Ph.D., Angrist joined Harvard University as an assistant professor until 1991, when he returned to Israel as a senior lecturer (equivalent to an assistant professor in the US system) at the Hebrew University. After being promoted to associate professor at Hebrew University, he joined MIT's Economics Department in 1996 as associate professor, before being raised to full professor in 1998. Since 2008, he has been MIT's Ford Professor of Economics and teaches econometrics and labor economics to its students. He additionally served as the Wesley Clair Mitchell Visiting professor at Columbia University in 2018. Angrist is affiliated with the National Bureau of Economic Research, the IZA Institute of Labor Economics, the American Economic Association, American Statistical Association, Econometric Society, Population Association of America and the Society of Labor Economists. In terms of professional service, he has performed editorial duties at the journals Econometrica, American Economic Review, American Economic Journal: Applied Economics, Journal of Business and Economic Statistics, Economics Letters, Labour Economics and the Journal of Labor Economics.

Angrist holds dual US–Israeli citizenship and lives in Brookline, Massachusetts.

== Research ==
Angrist's research interests include the economics of education and school reform, social programs and the labor market, the effects of immigration, labor market regulation and institutions, and econometric methods for program and policy evaluation. He ranks among the top 50 out of over 56,000 economists registered on IDEAS/RePEc in terms of research output. He is a frequent co-author of Guido Imbens, Alan B. Krueger, Victor Lavy, Parag Pathak and Jörn-Steffen Pischke. Together with Pischke, Angrist published Mostly Harmless Econometrics in 2008, in which they explore econometric tools used by empirical researchers. In 2014, Angrist and Pischke released Mastering 'Metrics': The Path from Cause to Effect, which is targeted at undergraduate econometrics students.

=== Economics of education ===
==== Research on the returns to schooling ====
The bulk of Angrist's research has concentrated on the economics of education, beginning with the returns to schooling. In one early study, Angrist and Krueger exploited the relationship between children's season of birth and educational attainment that is due to policies and laws setting ages for school start and compulsory schooling, finding that returns to education are close to their OLS estimates and that compulsory attendance laws constrain roughly 10% of students to stay in school who would have otherwise left. Another early attempt at using IV to estimate returns to schooling by Angrist and Krueger was to exploit the Vietnam-era draft lottery. However, while their later research on split-sample IVs confirmed the findings of their compulsory schooling research, it failed to support the returns to schooling estimates derived from the draft-lottery research. Angrist further used variation in U.S. compulsory schooling laws in research with Daron Acemoglu in order to estimate human-capital externalities, which they found to be about 1% and not statistically significant. Angrist has also studied the strong decrease in the economic returns to schooling in the West Bank and Gaza Strip in the 1980s. Together with Lavy, Angrist has also explored the returns to schooling in Morocco, exploiting a change in its language of instruction from French to Arabic to find that policy substantially reduced Moroccan youths' returns to schooling by deteriorating their French writing skills.

==== Research on the determinants of student learning ====
Another strand of Angrist's research in the economics of education concerns the impact of various inputs and rules on learning. For instance, in further work with Lavy, Angrist exploited Maimonides' rule, which limits class size to 40 students, in order to study the impact of class size on scholastic achievement in Israeli schools, finding that class size reduction substantially increase test scores for 4th and 5th graders, albeit not for 3rd graders. In further research at Israeli schools, they find that teacher training can cost-effectively improve students' test scores (at least in secular schools), that computer-aided instruction doesn't and that cash incentives raised high school achievement among girls (by inducing them to increase time invested into exam preparation) but were ineffective for boys. Similarly, in a study by Angrist, Philip Oreopoulos and Daniel Lang comparing the impact of academic support services, financial incentives and a combination of both on Canadian college first-year students, the combined treatment raised the grades of women throughout their first and second years but had no impact on men. In research on school vouchers for private schools in Colombia with Eric Bettinger, Erik Bloom, Elizabeth King and Michael Kremer, Angrist found voucher recipients 10 pp more likely to finish lower secondary school, 5-7 pp more likely to complete high school, and to score 0.2 standard deviations higher on tests, suggesting that the vouchers' benefits likely exceeded their $24 cost. Another subject of Angrist's research are peer effects in education, which he has e.g. explored with Kevin Lang in the context of METCO's school integrations or with Atila Abdulkadiroglu and Parag Pathak in Boston's and New York City's over-subscribed exam schools, though the effects that they find are brief and modest in both cases. With regard to the effect of teacher testing, which Angrist has studied with Jonathan Guryan in the U.S., he finds that state-mandated teacher testing raises teachers' wages without raising their quality, though it decreases teacher diversity by reducing the fraction of new teachers who are Hispanic. In work with Lavy and Analia Schlosser, Angrist has also explored Becker's hypothesis on a trade-off between child quality and quantity by exploiting variation in twin births and parental preferences for compositions of siblings of mixed sexes, with evidence rejecting the hypothesis.

===== Research on charter schools =====
Since the late 2000s, Angrist has conducted extensive research on charter schools in the U.S. with Pathak, Abdulkadiroglu, Susan Dynarski, Thomas Kane, and Christopher Walters. For instance, studying the KIPP Lynn Academy, they estimate that KIPP Lynn attendance increased students' math scores by 0.35 SD and their English scores by 0.12 SD, with most of the gains accruing to students with limited English proficiency or special education needs or those who scored low at baseline. Beyond KIPP Lynn, they find attendance to Boston charter schools to generally increase test scores for middle and high school students, especially for schools with binding assignment lotteries, whereas pilot schools (public schools covered by some collective bargaining provisions and more independence concerning educational policies) generally have at best statistically insignificant or small effects on students' test scores. Further research has attributed the relative efficacy of urban charter schools to these schools' embrace of the No Excuses approach to urban education which emphasizes student discipline and behaviour, traditional reading and math skills, instruction time, and selective teacher hiring.

=== Labor economics ===
Similar to his research on the economics of education, Angrist's research on labor economics also often seeks to exploit quasi-natural experiments to identify causal relationships. In a publication derived from his dissertation, Angrist e.g. exploits the military draft lottery during the Vietnam War to estimate that fighting in Vietnam reduced veterans' lifetime earnings by about 15% relative to those of nonveterans. Taking into account veterans' benefits that subsidized education and training (e.g. through the G.I. Bill), he finds that these benefits raised schooling in the U.S. by ca. 1.4 years and veterans' earnings by 6%. In further work exploiting the idiosyncrasies of U.S. military recruitment, Angrist studies the labor market impact of voluntary military service in the 1980s, estimating that voluntary soldiers serving in the 1980s earned considerably more than comparable civilians while serving and experienced comparatively higher employment rates thereafter, even though it raised their long-run civilian earnings at best modestly and - for whites - reduced them. Together with Krueger, Angrist also investigated with Krueger whether U.S. World War II veterans earned more than nonveterans, finding instead that they earned at most as much as comparable nonveterans. Angrist and Krueger later on summarized their work on causality in labor economics in a chapter of the Handbook of Labor Economics, with special emphasis on controls for confounding variables, fixed effects models and difference-in-differences, instrumental variables estimation and regression discontinuity designs. In another study related to the U.S. military, Angrist and John H. Johnson IV use the Gulf War to estimate the effects of work-related separations on military families, showing large differences between the impact of male and female soldiers' deployment on divorce rates and spousal labor supply. In work with William Evans, Angrist exploited families' preference for having siblings of mixed sex to estimate children's impact on parental labor supply, observing that family size had no impact on husbands' labor supply and that the impact on women was being overestimated through OLS. In further work with Evans, he also explored the impact of the 1970 state abortion reforms on schooling and labor market outcomes, arguing that they reduced Afro-American teen fertility and thereby raised black women's rates of high school completion, college attendance and employment. In another study with Acemoglu, Angrist has also analysed the consequences of the Americans with Disabilities Act of 1990 (ADA), finding a sharp drop in employment of persons with disabilities (PwDs) shortly after its inception, thus suggesting that ADA has likely hurt PwDs' labor market outcomes. Angrist has also studied the U.S. marriage market, finding—by exploiting endogamy in marriages—that high male-female sex ratios increased the likelihood of female marriage and decreased their labor force participation. Together with Adriana Kugler, Angrist finds that labor market institutions that reduce labor market flexibility exacerbate native job losses from immigration, especially regarding restricted product markets. Angrist and Kugler also investigated the relationship between coca prices and civil conflict in Colombia, observing that financial opportunities offered by coca cultivation fueled the conflict, with cultivated rural areas witnessing pronounced increases in violence.

=== Econometrics ===
Besides his empirical research, Angrist has also made major contributions to econometrics, especially concerning the use of instrumental variables estimations. For instance, Angrist developed a two-stage least squares (2SLS) equivalent of the efficient Wald estimator. Together with Guido Imbens, he developed the concept of local average treatment effects and showed how to identify and to estimate them, and how to use 2SLS to estimate the average causal effect of variable treatments. In further work with Imbens and Donald Rubin, Angrist then showed how instrumental variables can be embedded within the Rubin causal model in order to identify causal effects between variables. Angrist also developed with Imbens and Krueger so-called "jackknife instrumental variables estimators" to address the bias in 2SLS estimates in over-identified models and has explored the interpretation of IV estimators in simultaneous equations models along with Imbens and Kathryn Graddy. Again with Imbens, along with Alberto Abadie, he has also studied the effect of subsidized training due to the Job Training Partnership Act of 1982 on the quantiles of trainee earnings, finding large effects of JTPA on low-wage female workers but significant effects on men only for the upper half of the male trainee earnings distribution. With regard to limited dependent variable models with binary endogenous regressors, Angrist argues in favour of using 2SLS, multiplicative models for conditional means, linear approximation of non-linear causal models, models for distribution effects, and quantile regression with an endogenous binary regressor. Angrist has also explored the link between local average treatment effects and population average treatment effects, i.e., the external validity of IV estimates. Finally, along with Victor Chernozhukov and Iván Fernández-Val, Angrist has also explored quantile regressions, showing that they minimize a weighted MSE loss function for specification error.

In articles with Krueger as well as with Jorn-Steffen Pischke in the Journal of Economic Perspectives, Angrist has repeatedly made the case for a focus on the identification of causality in economics, e.g. using instrumental variables; in particular, Angrist has argued in 2010 in response to Edward Leamer's 1983 critique of econometrics that microeconomics had experienced since then a "credibility revolution" thanks to substantial improvements in empirical research designs and renewed attention to causal relationships.

== Honors and awards ==
Angrist is a Research Fellow at the Institute for the Study of Labor (IZA). He is also a fellow of the Econometric Society. He was elected a Fellow of the American Academy of Arts and Sciences in 2006. In 2007 Angrist received an honorary doctorate in economics from the University of St. Gallen. He is the recipient of the 2011 John von Neumann Award given annually by the Rajk László College for Advanced Studies in Budapest.

Angrist, along with Guido Imbens, won the 2021 Nobel Memorial Prize in Economics. The two men received one-half of the prize money of 10 million Swedish crowns ($1.14 million U.S.); the rest went to the other winner, David Card. The Royal Swedish Academy of Sciences wrote that:

Data from a natural experiment are difficult to interpret... . For example, extending compulsory education by a year for one group of students (but not another) will not affect everyone in that group in the same way. Some students would have kept studying anyway and, for them, the value of education is often not representative of the entire group. So, is it even possible to draw any conclusions about the effect of an extra year in school? In the mid-1990s, Joshua Angrist and Guido Imbens solved this methodological problem, demonstrating how precise conclusions about cause and effect can be drawn from natural experiments.

== See also ==
- Quasi-natural experiment
- List of Jewish Nobel laureates
- List of Israeli Nobel laureates
