= Victor Lavy =

Victor Chaim Lavy
- ויקטור לביא
- Occupations: Israeli economist and professor
- Website: https://warwick.ac.uk/fac/soc/economics/staff/vlavy/

Victor Chaim Lavy (Hebrew: ויקטור חיים לביא) is an Israeli economist and professor at the University of Warwick and the Hebrew University of Jerusalem. His research interests include labour economics, the economics of education, and development economics. Lavy belongs to the most prominent education economists in the world.

== Biography ==
Victor Lavy earned a B.A. in economics from the Hebrew University of Jerusalem in 1974, followed by a M.A. and a Ph.D. in economics from the University of Chicago in 1977 and 1979, respectively. Since his graduation, Lavy has continuously worked at the Hebrew University of Jerusalem, first as a lecturer in economics (1979–84), then as a senior lecturer (1985–89), before becoming a professor in 1990 and being made the William Haber Professor of Economics in 1997. In parallel, Lavy worked and continues to work in the United Kingdom, where he was a chaired professor of economics first at Royal Holloway, University of London (2006–11) and has been holding the same position at the University of Warwick since 2011. Additionally, Lavy has held visiting appointments at the University of Pennsylvania, Massachusetts Institute of Technology, the Centre for Economic Performance (LSE), Stanford University and the Hoover Institution.

Lavy maintains a number of academic affiliations, including with the Bureau for Research in the Economic Analysis of Development (BREAD), where he is a board member, and NBER, CEPR, CEP, IZA, and the IGC, where he holds positions as research fellow or associate. Moreover, Lavy is member of the AEA, Econometric Society, Royal Economic Society, and Society of Labor Economists. Besides his academic career, Lavy has repeatedly worked as an economist and consultant for the World Bank as well as for Israel's Ministry of Education. Finally, he also performs editorial duties at the American Economic Journal: Applied Economics (since 2016) and at Labour Economics (since 2006) and has done so in the past for Economic Development and Cultural Change.

== Research ==
Victor Lavy's research interests include labour economics, development economics and the economics of education. According to IDEAS/RePEc, Victor Lavy belongs to the top 2% of most cited economists worldwide. Many of Lavy's publications are co-authored with Joshua Angrist and typically exploit natural experiments to estimate economic outcomes such as the returns to schooling. In particular, cooperations between Lavy and Angrist of that type include Lavy's highest cited article - Using Maimonides' Rule to Estimate the Effect of Class Size on Children's Academic Achievement, for which Lavy and Angrist received the 2nd place at the 2000 Griliches Prize for Empirical Economics.

=== Development economics ===
Throughout the mid-1990s, Lavy performed field research on health and education in several developing countries, including Morocco, Côte d'Ivoire, Pakistan, and Ghana. Analysing how the quality of healthcare in Ghana affects the health of rural children, he (together with John Strauss, Duncan Thomas and Philippe de Vreyer) finds that making birth services and other related child programmes more widely available and improving water and sanitation infrastructure would likely strongly reduce the mortality rates of children in rural areas. In another study in Ghana, wherein Lavy studies the effect of introducing gradually increasing school fees, he finds that the schedule of these fees affects schoolchildren's educational choices in lower grades. In the Côte d'Ivoire, Lavy, Thomas and Strauss analyse the impact of economic adjustment programmes implemented in the 1980s and find that these programmes likely adversely affected the health of Ivorians by making health care services - especially immunizations - less available as well as of poorer quality and by increasing relative food prices. In Morocco, Angrist and Lavy exploit the change of Morocco's language of instruction from French to Arabic in 1983 to estimate the returns to learning French and find that the policy substantially reduced young Moroccans' returns to schooling by deteriorating their French writing skills. Finally, in Pakistan, Lavy, Harold Alderman, Jere R. Behrman and Rekha Menon investigate the impact of child health (proxied by nutrition) on school enrollment and find the effect of child health to be three times as large as conventional estimates in the literature suggest when child health is taken to be exogenous instead of being the result of households' decision.

In more recent work, Lavy, Eric Hanushek and Kohtaro Hitomi study how school quality in Egypt affects the dropout rates of students, with regard to which they find that - student ability and achievement held constant - students are much less likely to remain in school if they attend a low-quality school.

=== Economics of education ===
Since the late 1990s, the focus of Lavy's work has shifted towards the economics of education, including the study of determinants of student achievement and the evaluation of means to increase student achievement. In his most-cited study, Lavy (with Joshua Angrist) uses the application of Maimonides' rule in Jewish schools to estimate the effect of class size on student achievement in a quasi-regression discontinuity design and finds that class size reductions significantly and substantially increase the student achievements of fourth and fifth graders, though not of third graders. Another important educational input studied by Lavy (with Angrist) are classroom computers and their use for computer-aided instruction (in Israel); however, Lavy and Angrist conclude that the introduction of computer-aided instruction didn't improve education in a way that translated into higher student test scores.

==== Performance-based incentive schemes for teachers and students ====
Another substantial body of Lavy's work on education economics concerns the effect of financial incentives for teachers and students on learning outcomes. With regard to performance-based incentives for teachers, Lavy finds evidence in Israel that offering teachers group performance incentives is much more cost effective in terms of improving student performance than providing schools with additional conventional resources. Similarly, in an evaluation of the impact of individual cash bonuses for teachers for improving their students' performance in matriculation exams in Israel, Lavy finds them to significantly improve test attendance, conditional pass rates and mean test scores, an effect that is likely due to more appropriate teaching methods, improved after-school teaching, and teachers being more responsive to students' needs. Based on his research on performance-based teacher pay, Lavy has offered guidelines for the implementation of corresponding schemes in education systems, including close monitoring of teachers to prevent cheating, the importance of attainable goals, the restriction of incentives to a few "winners", and the alignment of individual and school level performance incentives. Finally, Lavy and Angrist have also conducted research on the effect of cash incentives for students on these students' performance in matriculation exams; while they found that the incentives induced girls to devote more time to exam preparation and thereby improved their certification rates, it was completely ineffective for boys.

==== Immigration and education ====
Lavy has also studied the emigration of Jews to Israel and the impact of their arrival on educational outcomes. For example, exploiting the sudden emigration of 15,000 Ethiopian Jews through Operation Solomon in 1991, Lavy, Eric Gould and Daniele Paserman find that the quality of immigrants' early school environment in Israel considerably affected high school dropout and class repetition rates as well as matriculation certification rates. In another study with Gould and Paserman, Lavy studies the sudden arrival of Jews from the Soviet Union in Israel after the fall of the Iron Curtain in 1991 and finds that the presence of immigrants negatively affected the long-term educational outcomes of natives by decreasing their matriculation certification rates.

==== Quantity-quality trade-off for children ====
Together with Joshua Angrist and Analia Schlosser, Lavy exploits widespread parental preferences for mixed sibling compositions and ethnic differences therein in Israel to assess the relationship between household fertility and children's education; they don't find any evidence for a trade-off between quantity and quality.

==== Peer effects in education ====
More recently, Lavy has studied the role of gender and ability peer effects in education in the United Kingdom and Israel. With regard to gender peer effects in Israeli elementary, middle and high schools, Lavy and Analia Schlosser find that increasing the proportion of girls in a class improves male and female pupils' cognitive outcomes by decreasing classroom disruption and violence, improving inter-student and student-teacher relationships, and decreasing teachers' fatigue, though the change in composition in itself doesn't affect individual behaviour. With regard to ability peer effects, Lavy, Olmo Silva and Felix Weinhardt find that bad peers in English schools tend to drag down all their classmates' performance, but that good peers only benefit girls but not boys. This result is largely replicated in Israel, where Lavy, Schlosser and Daniele Paserman study the effect of the proportion of low achievers in a class on their peers and find again a negative impact of bad peers on their classmates, especially on classmates who are low achievers themselves, mostly by disrupting teachers' teaching, deteriorating inter-student and student-teacher relationships, and making violence and classroom disruptions more likely to happen.
