= Econometrics in capitalism =

Use of econometric methods in market economies and capitalist institutions

Example of linear regression, a fundamental method in econometrics used to estimate relationships between economic variables.

Econometrics in capitalism refers to the application of econometrics—the statistical and mathematical analysis of economic data—within capitalist and market-based economic systems. Econometric methods are widely used by governments, corporations, financial institutions, and international organizations to analyze economic behavior, evaluate policies, and forecast economic trends.

Econometrics combines economic theory, statistics, and mathematical economics to estimate relationships between economic variables using empirical data. In contemporary capitalist economies characterized by market allocation and price signals, econometric analysis is commonly used to study macroeconomic performance, financial markets, and business behavior.

== History ==
The development of econometrics as a formal discipline began in the early twentieth century, when economists sought to test theoretical models using statistical data.

The term econometrics was introduced in 1926 by the Norwegian economist Ragnar Frisch. Frisch advocated the systematic integration of mathematics, statistics, and economic theory in empirical research.

Institutional development of the discipline accelerated with the founding of the Econometric Society in 1930, an international organization dedicated to advancing quantitative economic analysis. The society also established the journal Econometrica, which became one of the leading journals in economics.

Economists such as Jan Tinbergen and Trygve Haavelmo played key roles in developing econometric methodology. Tinbergen constructed some of the first macroeconomic models used for economic policy analysis, while Haavelmo introduced probabilistic foundations for econometric inference.

Frisch and Tinbergen jointly received the first Nobel Memorial Prize in Economic Sciences in 1969 for their contributions to econometric modeling.

== Role in market economies ==
Econometric analysis plays a central role in many institutions operating within modern capitalist economies, including central banks, financial markets, corporations, and international economic organizations.

=== Macroeconomic policy ===
Central banks and governments use econometric models to analyze economic indicators such as inflation, unemployment, gross domestic product (GDP), and interest rates.

International institutions such as the International Monetary Fund and the World Bank employ econometric forecasting models to analyze global economic trends and support policy analysis. National central banks also rely on econometric modeling when designing and evaluating monetary policy.

=== Financial markets ===
In financial economics, econometric methods are widely used to analyze financial time series and estimate relationships among asset prices.

Applications include portfolio optimization, derivatives pricing, and the study of stock market volatility. Econometric models such as autoregressive conditional heteroskedasticity (ARCH) and vector autoregression are commonly used in financial analysis.

=== Corporate decision-making ===
Private firms frequently apply econometric techniques to analyze consumer demand, evaluate advertising effectiveness, optimize pricing strategies, and forecast market behavior.

=== Policy evaluation ===
Econometric methods are commonly used to evaluate the effects of public policies such as taxation, education programs, welfare policies, and labor market regulations.

Researchers often apply techniques such as regression analysis, panel data models, and instrumental variables to estimate causal relationships in observational data.

These approaches are widely used in fields including development economics and labor economics.

== Methods ==
Econometric analysis relies on several statistical techniques used to estimate relationships between economic variables.

- Regression analysis – estimation of statistical relationships between economic variables
- Time series analysis – analysis of economic data observed over time
- Panel data models – combination of cross-sectional and time-series observations
- Causal inference – methods (such as difference-in-differences and regression discontinuity design) used to determine cause-and-effect relationships within empirical data

These methods allow economists to test theoretical predictions derived from microeconomics and macroeconomics using empirical data.

== Criticism ==
Economist Tony Lawson has argued that econometric models rely on simplifying assumptions that may not fully capture institutional and structural aspects of economic systems.

Similarly, Edward Leamer highlighted issues such as model specification errors, data limitations, and challenges in identifying causal relationships in complex economic systems.

== See also ==
- Econometrics
- Capitalism
- Economic methodology
- Financial economics
- Economic forecasting
- Political economy
