= Christopher Walters =

American economist

Christopher R. Walters
- Born: United States

Academic background
- Education: B.A., Economics and philosophy PhD., Economics
- Alma mater: University of Virginia; Massachusetts Institute of Technology

Academic work
- Institutions: University of California, Berkeley

Christopher R. Walters is an American economist, academic and author. He is professor of Economics at the University of California, Berkeley.

Walters is most known for his work in labor economics, the economics of education, and applied econometrics. His research has been published in academic journals, including the Quarterly Journal of Economics, American Economic Review, Econometrica, and Journal of Political Economy. He is a research associate at the National Bureau of Economic Research, a research fellow at the Institute of Labor Economics (IZA), and a co-Editor of the American Economic Journal: Applied Economics.

== Education ==
Walters completed his B.A. in Economics and Philosophy from the University of Virginia in 2008. Later in 2013, he obtained his PhD in Economics from the Massachusetts Institute of Technology.

== Career ==
Walters began his academic career in 2013 as an assistant professor of economics at the University of California, Berkeley. He was promoted to associate professor of economics in 2018 and professor of economics in 2024 at the same institution.

== Research ==
Walters' research has focused on the economics of education, evaluating the effectiveness of charter schools, early childhood education programs, and school choice initiatives. His studies have often used randomized lotteries and economic choice models to assess the impact of educational interventions on student outcomes and the links between these effects and educational choices. He explored charter schools, particularly the KIPP network, which employed a "No Excuses" model, showing positive impacts on student achievement, especially for disadvantaged groups like limited English proficiency (LEP) and special needs students. His work suggested these schools were more effective in urban settings. In his research on early childhood education, he analyzed Head Start, finding it beneficial for children who otherwise wouldn't attend preschool, particularly when offering full-day services and home visits. His research on school choice, specifically the Louisiana Scholarship Program, showed negative effects due to low-quality private schools entering the program. Additionally, he studied the long-term impacts of a universal preschool program in Boston, finding positive effects on college attendance and behavioral outcomes, but no significant impact on test scores. He evaluated India's Integrated Child Development Services, showing that increasing staffing improved educational and health outcomes for children.

Walters' research also spans key areas of labor economics and econometrics, with a focus on experimental methods, causal inference, and policy evaluation. In econometrics, he explored the use of instrumental variables (IV) and control function (CF) methods to estimate local average treatment effects (LATE), and studied settings with multiple instruments and heterogeneity in treatment effects. His work in labor economics used experiments and empirical Bayes methods to study employer- and job-level discrimination by race and gender. His findings also revealed significant heterogeneity in discrimination across employers, while also offering practical tools to monitor discrimination efficiently.

== Selected articles ==
- Angrist, J. D., Pathak, P. A., & Walters, C. R. (2013). Explaining charter school effectiveness. American Economic Journal: Applied Economics, 5(4), 1–27.
- Kline, P., & Walters, C. R. (2016). Evaluating public programs with close substitutes: The case of Head Start. The Quarterly Journal of Economics, 131(4), 1795–1848.
- Abdulkadiroğlu, A., Pathak, P. A., & Walters, C. R. (2018). Free to choose: Can school choice reduce student achievement?. American Economic Journal: Applied Economics, 10(1), 175–206.
- Abdulkadiroğlu, A., Pathak, P. A., Schellenberg, J., & Walters, C. R. (2020). Do parents value school effectiveness?. American Economic Review, 110(5), 1502–1539.
- Kline, P., Rose, E., & Walters, C. R. (2022). Systemic discrimination among large US employers. The Quarterly Journal of Economics, 137(4), 1963–2036.
