= Maurice Kugler =

Colombian American economist (born 1967)

- Born: Maurice David Kugler; November 24, 1967 (age 58); Minneapolis, Minnesota, U.S.

Academic background
- Education: University of California, Berkeley (Ph.D.); London School of Economics and Political Science (B.Sc. and M.Sc.)
- Doctoral advisors: Paul Romer; Pranab Bardhan; J. Bradford DeLong; Pablo Spiller
- Other advisors: George Akerlof; Jeffrey Frankel; Maurice Obstfeld
- Influences: Paul Romer; Michael Kremer; Dani Rodrik; John Haltiwanger; Ricardo Hausmann

Academic work
- School or tradition: Endogenous growth theory
- Institutions: Schar School of Policy and Government of George Mason University
- Website: Information at IDEAS / RePEc

Maurice Kugler is a Colombian American economist born in 1967. He received his Ph.D. in economics from UC Berkeley in 2000, as well as an M.Sc. (Econ) and a B.Sc. (Econ) both from the London School of Economics. Kugler is professor of public policy and economics in the Schar School of Policy and Government at George Mason University. Prior to this, he worked as a consultant for the World Bank, where he was senior economist before (2010-2012). Most recently he was principal research scientist and managing director at IMPAQ International.

Prior to that, he was head of the development research and data unit of UNDP, where he was the lead writer of the Human Development Report. He was named in 2007 to the inaugural CIGI Chair in International Public Policy by the Laurier School of Business and Economics. In 2010, CIGI, the Centre for International Governance Innovation, jointly with University of Waterloo and Wilfrid Laurier University launched the Balsillie School of International Affairs.

In 2007, Kugler was appointed visiting professor of public policy at Harvard Kennedy School at Harvard University. The economics bibliographic database IDEAS/RePEc has ranked Kugler among the top 4 percent of economists worldwide by a number of criteria, including average rank score, the number of citations, the h-index, and the breadth of citations across fields. Also, he has more than 9,500 citations in Google Scholar, with over 20 contributions garnering over 100 citations, reflected in an h-index of 34 and an i10-index of 41.

== Research ==
Kugler has conducted research on international trade, foreign direct investment and skilled migration. He explores how global market integration impacts on the prospects of economic growth and convergence for the poor in nations and regions. Since 2006, he has been research fellow at the Growth Lab of the Center for International Development at Harvard University, and since 2007, visiting scholar at the National Bureau of Economic Research (NBER). Before becoming a professor at George Mason University, he taught at Harvard University, Los Andes, Southampton, Stanford University, and Wilfrid Laurier Universities.

His scholarly work has been published in top economics journals, including the American Economic Review by the American Economic Association, the Review of Economic Studies by Oxford University Press, the Review of Economics and Statistics by MIT Press, Economic Development and Cultural Change by The University of Chicago Press, the Journal of Policy Reform by Routledge, the Journal of Public Economics by Elsevier, the Journal of Development Economics by Elsevier, and Economics Letters, and other academic journals.

This research has been recognized with the Juan Luis Londoño Prize, presented to the best paper on social policy in the Latin American and Caribbean Economic Association (LACEA) Conference program, Santa Cruz de la Sierra, Bolivia, October 15–17, 2015 (“Educational, Labor Market, and Welfare Impacts of Scholarships for Private Secondary School: Evidence from Colombia,” co-authored with Eric Bettinger, Michael Kremer, Carlos Medina, Christian Posso and Juan Saavedra); and also with the First Prize for Best Contribution in the area of “Globalization, Regulation and Development” at the Global Development Network Annual Conference Program, Prague, Czech Republic, January 16–18, 2010 (“Trade Reforms and Market Selection: Evidence from Manufacturing Plants in Colombia,” co-authored with Marcela Eslava, John Haltiwanger and Adriana Kugler.) In addition, the latter paper was published in 2013 in the Review of Economic Dynamics and was identified by the publisher, Elsevier Science, as one of the most highly cited papers during 2014, 2015 and up until June 2016, according to data from Scopus (the largest abstract and citation database of peer-reviewed literature).

=== Foreign direct investment ===
In his work on spillovers from foreign direct investment (FDI), Kugler has shown that the presence of multinational corporation affiliates (MNC) can yield technological opportunities for host country producers in upstream sectors, especially when the MNC subsidiary is an exporter and the potential spillover recipient firm has absorptive capacity to adopt new technology. When subsidiaries and local firms are connected through the production chain, then FDI generates transmission of technological know-how as input suppliers are the recipients of information from their clients.

(See e.g. Maurice Kugler (2006), "Spillovers from foreign direct investment: within or between industries? Journal of Development Economics, Vol. 80, No. 2, pp. 444–477).

Other recent evidence of the impact of FDI on Venezuelan manufacturers shows that when MNC subsidiaries use the host country as an export platform, there tends to be more scope for FDI spillovers, especially within sectors as subsidiaries do not compete for the domestic market with local firms. In particular, the fact that exporter subsidiaries are more prone to transmit information to local firms implies that vertical FDI is more likely to generate spillovers. Since vertical FDI involves the import of components and assembly for exports, the incentive to prevent technology leakages to domestic firms is diminished, as they are not in the competitive fringe.

A study on the link between labor migration and FDI shows them to be complementary rather than substitutes as standard trade theory would suggest. In a neoclassical model, for the capital-labor ratios to equalize, in the presence of factor mobility, either jobs flow to workers in the form of capital inflows or workers flow to jobs in the form of migration, in countries with relatively low capital-labor ratios. In this context, migration and FDI would be substitutes. However, if migration leads to information flows about investment opportunities in the origin country of workers entering the labor force in their destination country, there can be a dynamic complementarity between migration and subsequent FDI.

=== International migration ===
Research on the determinants FDI location shows evidence consistent with the incorporation of skilled migrants into business networks at the destination country. The links created by these migrants appear to create opportunities for investors in the destination country for FDI project at the migrants' countries of origin. FDI creates jobs where workers have left because those workers convey information to MNC headquarters.

(See e.g. Souraya El Yaman, Maurice Kugler and Hillel Rapoport (2006), "Migration and Foreign Investments across the European Union: What are the Links?" Revue Economique, Vol. 58, No. 3, pp. 725–733).

Research on the impact of remittances to mitigate brain drain analyzes conditions under which migration can have a positive impact on human capital formation. There is a direct channel as remittance recipients overcome borrowing constraints to invest in schooling. And there is an indirect channel since the greater supply of human capital can generate creation of skilled jobs, through a thick-market externality. The likelihood that new human capital formation, associated with remittances, exceeds brain drain is higher in the context of well-functioning education systems and labor markets.

=== Exports ===
Research on export dynamics suggests that experimentation is an important component of the investment to establish presence in a new market, understood as a product and destination combination. Exporters need to receive a profitability signal when they export in different markets in order to know whether market penetration is likely to generate enough sales to cover fixed costs of market entry. Initially they export small quantities and depending on the signal received from customers, they either expand sales or cease to export in the new market. This pattern fits the experience of Colombian exporters.

Research on the scope for learning from successful exporters, recent evidence from Argentina points to gains for nonexporters that supply intermediate inputs to exporters. While there widespread evidence that FDI generates learning from multinational subsidiaries, there is limited evidence that exporters, which are exceptional performers, create similar opportunities for spillovers. It appears that subsidiaries of multinational corporations do not generate spillovers unless they are exporters. This suggests that exporting spillovers can be a source of productivity growth.

== Past activities ==
Prior to becoming a professor of public policy at George Mason University after working at IMPAQ International for three years, Kugler was head of research for the Human Development Report, the flagship publication of the United Nations on international development. His previous post was as senior economist at the World Bank. Prior to that, he was visiting professor of public policy at Harvard Kennedy School at Harvard University and research fellow at the Growth Lab of the Center for International Development at Harvard University. He conducted research on how social policies impact upon the prospects of human development in nations and regions.

Kugler has held academic positions at the economics departments of Universidad de Los Andes, in Colombia, and University of Southampton, in the United Kingdom. As well as being visiting professor at Harvard University, he was visiting assistant professor at Stanford University.

Kugler's research has received generous funding and support. He has been awarded research grants by the NSF and the Tinker Foundation in the United States as well as DfID and the ESRC in the United Kingdom. He was principal investigator (PI) for research sponsored by the Inter-American Development Bank and the World Bank. Also, while working at IMPAQ International, he was PI for projects funded by the U.S. Department of Labor (DOL), the U.S. Small Business Administration (SBA) and the United Nations Children's Fund (UNICEF). Finally, he has been adviser to the Central Bank and Government of Colombia, as well as consultant for the Inter-American Development Bank and the World Bank.

== See also ==
- List of University of Waterloo people
