= Mostly Harmless Econometrics =

Econometrics book

Mostly Harmless Econometrics: An Empiricist's Companion
- Author: Joshua Angrist and Jörn-Steffen Pischke
- Language: English
- Genre: Non-fiction
- Publication date: Jan 4, 2009
- Pages: 392
- ISBN: 978-0-691-12035-5

Mostly Harmless Econometrics: An Empiricist's Companion is an econometrics book written by two labour economists Joshua Angrist and Jörn-Steffen Pischke.

Labour economist Jan Kmenta notes that the book is not a textbook, but rather a book describing a series of econometric issues encountered by the authors in their empirical research and they implicitly advocate the approaches they have taken.

The same two authors have written a more basic book covering similar topics and approaches: Mastering 'Metrics: The Path from Cause to Effect.

== Overview ==
The book has eight substantial chapters organized in three sections:

1. preliminaries,
2. the core and
3. extensions

The first section on Preliminaries outlines the basic approach taken, highlighting the importance of identifying what the causal relationships of interest are. They stress the importance of research design and random assignment.

The second section, The Core, stresses the importance of trying to make regression interpretability. The first of the major approach they advocate are instrumental variables. They recognize that good instrumental variables can be rare and they suggest approaches to deal with unobserved confounders. Under the headings fixed effects, differences-in-differences, and panel data, they suggest the use data with a time or cohort dimension to control for unobserved but fixed omitted variables.

The final section has chapters on regression discontinuity designs and quantile regressions and ways of coping with nonstandard standard error issues.

== Reception ==
The book has been widely reviewed. One such review is by Kmenta. He takes issue with several elements, but is overall positive. He argues that the book helps extend the vocabulary of econometricians by introducing terminology not encountered in standard econometric textbooks and that the book proves particularly interesting for micro-econometricians in general and labour economists in particular. Another review, by Gelman, a statistician rather than a labour economist, is more critical. He argues that despite the breadth promised by its title, the coverage of econometrics is rather limited, with the data being addressed is largely cross-sectional with little acknowledgement of time-series data. Moreover, he criticizes the fact that the only problems addressed are causal, whereas econometricians are typically also interested forecasting, descriptive analyses, and testing of theories. The lack of acknowledgement of nonparametric methods, Bayesian inference, or models other than the standard linear regression are also raised as issues. The lack of model building is central Gelman's critiques.
