= Jere Behrman =

American economist (born 1940)

- Occupation: Economist

Academic background
- Education: Professor of Economics
- Alma mater: Williams College & Massachusetts Institute of Technology

Academic work
- Institutions: University of Pennsylvania

Jere Richard Behrman (born March 2, 1940) is an American economist and the William R. Kenan Jr. Professor of Economics at the University of Pennsylvania. He belongs to the world's most prominent development and education economists and human capital scholars, with a strong focus on Central and South America.

== Education ==
Jere R. Behrman earned a Bachelor of Arts in physics from Williams College in 1962, followed by a Master of Arts and Ph.D. in economics from the Massachusetts Institute of Technology in 1966 for a thesis on the dynamics of the supply of crops in Thailand between 1937 and 1963. He also attended the Russian Language Institute at Indiana University Bloomington in the summers of 1960 and 1961.

== Academic career ==
Already before his graduation, Behrman began working at the University of Pennsylvania, with which he has been affiliated throughout his academic career, first as an assistant professor of economics (1965–68), then as associate professor (1968–71), and finally as full professor (since 1971); in 1983, Behrman was honoured with the William R. Kenan Jr. professorship in economics. At the University of Pennsylvania, Behrman additionally serves as an associate director of the Population Aging Research Center, and is a faculty fellow at the Center for the Advanced Study of India, and a research associate at the Population Studies Center, among else. In the past, he has served as director of the Center for Analysis of Developing Economies (1982–95), director of the Population Aging Research Center (1998–99), and director of the Population Studies Center (1998–2005), and chaired the Department of Economics of the University of Pennsylvania (1973–79). Moreover, Behrman performs or has performed editorial duties for the Journal of Development Economics, Demography, Journal of Applied Econometrics, International Organization, International Economic Review, Economics of Education Review, Asian Development Review, Journal of Asian Economies, Journal of Development Studies, Educational Economics, and the IZA World of Labor. Finally, he has also worked as consultant for numerous international organizations, including the World Bank, International Labour Organization, Inter-American Development Bank, Asian Development Bank, United Nations Development Programme, and the Department for International Development.

== Research ==
Jere Behrman's research revolves around the empirical determinants and impacts of human resources such as early childhood development, education, health and nutrition in the presence of unobserved factors (e.g. innate ability or health), the economics of households and imperfect markets, and the economic consequences of imperfect information. As a consequence, a substantial part of Behrman's research involves twin studies. According to IDEAS/RePEc, he belongs to the 1% of highest ranked economists worldwide.

=== The economics of households ===
After early work in agricultural and international economics in developing countries, Behrman turned towards the analysis of households' economic decisions in the mid-1970s. In this area, together with Robert A. Pollak and Paul Taubman, Behrman developed a model for the analysis of parental allocations of resources among their children and finds evidence that U.S. American parents address inequality in their children's earnings by providing more resources to their less able children. Studying whether and how children's order of birth affects how much resources their parents give them, Behrman and Taubman find that parents in the United States give more to firstborns, possibly because of endowment effects, even though they tend to favour later-borns. These differences are then reflected in the relationship between children's birth order and their (age-adjusted) schooling and earnings as young adults. Studying the distribution of food among children within households in rural South India, Behrman finds that parents give preference to their sons when food is scarce, especially among lower caste households, and display only limited aversion for such inequality, thus suggesting that girls may be particularly vulnerable to malnutrition during famines. Using data from rural Pakistan, Behrman, Harold Alderman, Victor Lavy and Rekha Menon analyse the relationship between child health and school enrollment while explicitly modeling child health as determined by household choices in response to unobserved factors such as children's health endowments and find child health (proxied by nutrition) is three times as important for enrollment under that specification.

Using twin experiments, Behrman, Taubman and Mark Rosenzweig find that 27% of the variance in income and 42% of the variance in obesity between individuals in the United States can be explained by individuals' unique endowments. The effect of these individual endowments are further reinforced through schooling, though somewhat diluted as men with high individual endowments tend to marry less educated wives. In another study using twins, Behrman and Rosenzweig find that increasing the schooling of women doesn't increase the schooling of their children once heritable ability and assortative matching are taken into account, and instead reduces the time mothers spent at home.

=== The determinants and impacts of education, health and nutrition ===
Behrman's research on the determinants and impacts of education, health and nutrition (mostly in Latin America) began in the early 1980s. One early theme revolves around nutrition, what it is affected by, and how it in turn affects health, education and earnings. For example, using evidence from south India, Behrman and Anil Deolalikar investigate the relationship between nutrition and income growth and find that the consumption of nutrients is essentially unresponsive to increases in income, even though food expenditure increases more or less in line with income; they conclude that as the poor grow richer, they tend to spend their income on more expensive nutrients rather than simply on more nutrients. Behrman's work on the relationship between health and nutrition in developing countries also features prominently in his and Deolalikar's review of the corresponding literature in the Handbook of Development Economics. However, though Behrman has called for the provision of public services to improve the health (and nutrition) of poor children based on the conclusion that child health likely has "considerable" effects on adult labour productivity by e.g. improving education, he repeatedly emphasized that the methodological weakness of the literature on the impact of health and nutrition on education (e.g. regarding reverse causality) prevented broader conclusions and called for more research on this issue (in the 1990s). In line with this call, Behrman and Rosenzweig offer evidence that returns in terms of adult schooling attainment (and partly also in terms of higher earnings) to increasing birthweight are high, being underestimated by up to 50% if genetics and family background aren't controlled for. However, they also find that differences in birthweights don't play a large role in determining the world distribution of income. Last, evaluating the impact of improving nutrition during early childhood on education among adults in Guatemala, Behrman, Maluccio, Hoddinott, Martorell, Quisumbing and Stein find that doing so increased the average number of grades completed by women by 1.2 grades as well as both male and female reading comprehension and non-verbal cognitive ability by one quarter standard deviation, thus suggesting that improvements to the nutrient intakes of very young children can have substantial long-term educational impacts.

In a theme often related to nutrition and health, Behrman has conducted research on the determinants and impacts of education, especially in Latin America. One of the most cited examples of such research is his and Nancy Birdsall's critique of education economics' focus on the quantity of schooling at the detriment of schooling's quality. Using evidence on the returns to schooling for young Brazilian men, they find that accounting for differences in the quality of schooling reduces these returns by half, thus suggesting that the social returns to investments into schooling quality may even exceed those to investments into schooling quantity. Moreover, Behrman and Birdsall find that variation in schooling quality partly explains variation in returns to schooling over space and among individuals. Finally, in a prominent programme evaluation, Behrman, Piyali Sengupta and Petra Todd find that the Mexican conditional cash transfer programme PROGRESA, wherein transfers are conditional upon children regularly attending school, effectively reduced dropout rates and facilitates grade progression, especially from primary to secondary school, and thereby increased schooling attainment by on average 0.7 years.
