= Event study =

Statistical method in economics

An event study is a statistical and econometric method to assess the impact of events on outcome variables. An event study is a difference-in-differences design applied to panel data, wherein individuals receive treatment at different points in time.

As the event methodology can be used to elicit the effects of any type of event on the direction and magnitude of any outcome variable, it is very versatile in quasi-experimental contexts. Event studies are thus common to various research areas, such as accounting, finance, management, economics, marketing, information technology, law, political science, operations, and supply chain management.

One aspect often used to structure the overall body of event studies is the breadth of the studied event types. On the one hand, there is research investigating the stock market responses to economy-wide events (i.e., market shocks, such as regulatory changes, or catastrophic events like war). On the other hand, event studies are used to investigate the stock market responses to corporate events, such as mergers and acquisitions, earnings announcements, debt or equity issues, corporate reorganisations, investment decisions, and corporate social responsibility.

== Methodology ==
The general event study methodology is explained in, for example, MacKinlay (1997) or Mitchell and Netter (1994). In MacKinlay (1997), this is done "using financial market data" to "measure the impact of a specific event on the value of a firm". He argues that "given rationality in the marketplace, the effects of an event will be reflected immediately in security prices. Thus a measure of the event's economic impact can be constructed using security prices observed over a relatively short time period". Short-horizon event studies are more reliable than long-horizon event studies, as the latter have many limitations. However, Kothari and Warner (2005) were able to refine long-horizon methodologies in order to improve the design and reliability of the studies over longer periods.

=== Empirical Methods ===
Event studies, however, may differ with respect to their specification of normal returns. The most common model for normal returns is the 'market model' (MacKinlay 1997). Following this model, the analysis implies to use an estimation window (typically sized 120 days) prior to the event to derive the typical relationship between the firm's stock and a reference index through a regression analysis. Based on the regression coefficients, the normal returns are then projected and used to calculate the abnormal returns. Alternative models for the normal returns include the CAPM model, or more simplistic approaches such as mean returns (see MacKinlay 1997 for an overview).

=== Calculation of abnormal returns ===
Depending on the model chosen for the 'normal return', conducting event studies requires the researcher to implement a distinct sequence of steps. For the most common model, the 'market model', the steps are as follows:

1. Retrieve and match time series of financial returns of the focal firm's stock and its reference index.
2. For each event, identify the sequences of firm and market returns that need to be included in the estimation window.
3. Using regression analysis, calculate the alpha, beta and sigma coefficients that explicate the typical relationship between the stock and the reference index.
4. With these three parameters, predict the 'normal returns' for all days of the event window.
5. Deducting these 'normal returns' from the 'actual returns' gives you the 'abnormal returns' which are the metrics of interest.

=== Significance of abnormal returns ===
To specify if individual abnormal returns differ from zero with some statistical validity, test statistics need to be applied. Various test statistics at the different levels of analysis (i.e., AR-, CAR-, AAR- and CAAR-level) exist for this purpose. The most common test, the t-test, divides the abnormal returns through the root mean square error of the regression. Resulting t-values need then to be compared with the critical values of the Student's t-distribution. There is some evidence that during times of high fluctuations over the short run such as during the 2008 financial crisis, too many companies tend to show significantly abnormal returns using the t-test, which makes it more difficult to determine which returns are truly "abnormal".

=== Software for conducting event studies ===
Event studies can be implemented with various different tools. Single event studies can easily be implemented with MS Excel, event studies covering multiple events need to be built using statistical software packages (e.g., STATA, Matlab). Besides of these multi-use tools, there are solutions tailored to conducting event study analyses (e.g., Eventus, EventStudyTools).

== Application to merger analysis ==
The logic behind the event study methodology (within the specific context of mergers) is explained in Warren-Boulton and Dalkir (2001):

Investors in financial markets bet their dollars on whether a merger will raise or lower prices. A merger that raises market prices will benefit both the merging parties and their rivals and thus raise the prices for all their shares. Conversely, the financial community may expect the efficiencies from the merger to be sufficiently large to drive down prices. In this case, the share values of the merging firms’ rivals fall as the probability of the merger goes up. Thus, evidence from financial markets can be used to predict market price effects when significant merger-related events have taken place.

Warren-Boulton and Dalkir (2001) apply their event-probability methodology to the proposed merger between Staples, Inc. and Office Depot (1996), which was challenged by the Federal Trade Commission and eventually withdrawn.

=== Findings ===
Warren-Boulton and Dalkir (2001) find highly significant returns to the only rival firm in the relevant market. Based on these returns, they are able to estimate the price effect of the merger in the product market which is highly consistent with the estimates of the likely price increase from other independent sources.

== Application in litigation ==
The results of event studies have been accepted as evidence in litigation in US, in the quantification of damages in cases relating to securities fraud.

== See also ==
- Post earnings announcement drift, an anomaly found in event studies of earnings announcements
- Center for Research in Security Prices, database commonly used in event studies
