= Leamer =

Leamer is a surname. Notable people with the surname include:

- Edward E. Leamer (1944–2025), American economist and professor at UCLA
- Laurence Leamer (born 1941), American author and journalist
