= Eric Bettinger =

American economist

Eric P. Bettinger is an American economist and currently works as the Conley-DeAngelis Family Professor of Education at the Stanford Graduate School of Education. He ranks among the world's leading education economists.

== Biography ==
Eric Bettinger earned a B.A. in economics from Brigham Young University in 1996 and a Ph.D. in economics from the Massachusetts Institute of Technology in 2000. After his graduation, he became a professor at Case Western Reserve University. Since 2008, Bettinger has been a professor of education at the Stanford Graduate School of Education as well as a professor of economics (by courtesy) at the Stanford School of Business. Moreover, he is affiliated with the National Bureau of Economic Research and the Abdul Latif Jameel Poverty Action Lab. Other affiliations include the Stanford Center for Education Policy Analysis, the Lemann Center for Entrepreneurship and Educational Innovation in Brazil, the Stanford Center for International Development, the Center for the Analysis of Postsecondary Education and Employment and the Center for the Analysis of Postsecondary Readiness at Teacher's College. Bettinger received an honorary doctorate from the University of Zurich in April 2022.

== Research ==
Eric Bettinger's current research interests include the economics of education, educational policy, higher education, and comparative education. According to IDEAS/RePEc, Bettinger belongs to the 5% of most highly cited economists worldwide. Key findings of his research include:

=== Impact evaluations of educational interventions in primary and secondary school ===
- Financially rewarding elementary school students for test completion effectively improved test scores in math but not in reading, social science or science.
- The winners of vouchers for partial coverage of private secondary school tuition in Colombia were ca. 10% more likely to have finished 8th grade and scored 0.2 standard deviations higher on achievement tests three years later, and raised secondary school completion rates in the long-term by 15-20%, with the benefits to participants likely exceeding the $24 of additional cost to the government of supplying vouchers instead of public school places (with Joshua Angrist, Erik Bloom, Elizabeth King, and Michael Kremer).
- Test scores of charter school students don't improve, and may actually decline, relative to those of public school students, suggesting that charter schools have had little or no effect on test scores in neighbouring public schools.

=== Impact evaluations of educational interventions in higher education ===
- Students in remediation are more likely to persist in college compared to students with similar backgrounds who were not required to take remedial courses (with Bridget Terry Long).
- Providing low-income individuals assistance with applying for student aid and/or information comparing student aid with college tuition costs results in increased college attendance, persistence, and aid receipt, suggesting a broad spectrum of applications for personal assistance (with Long, Philip Oreopoulos and Lisa Sanbonmatsu).
- Pell Grants are found to reduce college drop-out and suggest a relationship between need-based aid and college completion.
- Female teachers positively influence female students' selection of courses and choice of major in some disciplines, which is coherent with a role model effect, though no such effect is found in male-dominated fields (with Long).
- Adjuncts appear to have a small, positive effect on student enrollment patterns in higher education, in particular in fields related to specific occupations (with Long).
- Student coaching effectively increases college persistence, even one year after coaching ended, and proved cost effective compared to e.g. increased financial aid for students (with Rachel Baker).
