= Peter Kennedy (economist) =

Peter E. Kennedy
- Born: May 18, 1943; Toronto, Ontario
- Died: August 30, 2010 (aged 67)

Academic background
- Education: Queen's University (B.A.); University of Wisconsin–Madison (Ph.D.)
- Doctoral advisor: Richard H. Day

Academic work
- Discipline: Econometrics
- Institutions: Simon Fraser University
- Notable ideas: A Guide to Econometrics
- Website: Information at IDEAS / RePEc

Peter E. Kennedy (1943–2010) was a Canadian economist who taught for many years at the Simon Fraser University. His most famous work was his noted textbook, A Guide to Econometrics. In this guide, and in a subsequent summary article, he produced Ten Commandments of Applied Econometrics. These are that Thou shalt:

1. Use common sense and economic theory
2. Ask the right question
3. Know the context
4. Inspect the data
5. Not worship complexity
6. Look long and hard at thy results
7. Beware the costs of data mining
8. Be willing to compromise
9. Not confuse statistical significance with substance
10. Confess in the presence of sensitivity.

He was born in Toronto and grew up close by in Port Credit. He was educated at Queen's University, graduating in 1965, and at the University of Wisconsin-Madison, where he received his Ph.D. in 1968. He worked briefly at Cornell University in 1968 before moving to Simon Fraser University that same year. He remained at SFU for the next 43 years and was appointed an emeritus professor in 2008.

== Selected publications ==
- Kennedy, P. (2008). A Guide to Econometrics (6th ed.). Cambridge, MA: Wiley-Blackwell.
- Kennedy, P. (2010). Macroeconomic Essentials: Understanding Economics in the News (3rd ed.). Cambridge, Mass: MIT Press.
- Kennedy, P. (2002). "Sinning in the Basement: What Are the Rules? The Ten Commandments of Applied Econometrics". Journal of Economic Surveys. 16 (4): 569–589. doi:10.1111/1467-6419.00179. S2CID 154717727.
