= Timothy Taylor (economist) =

American economist (born 1960)

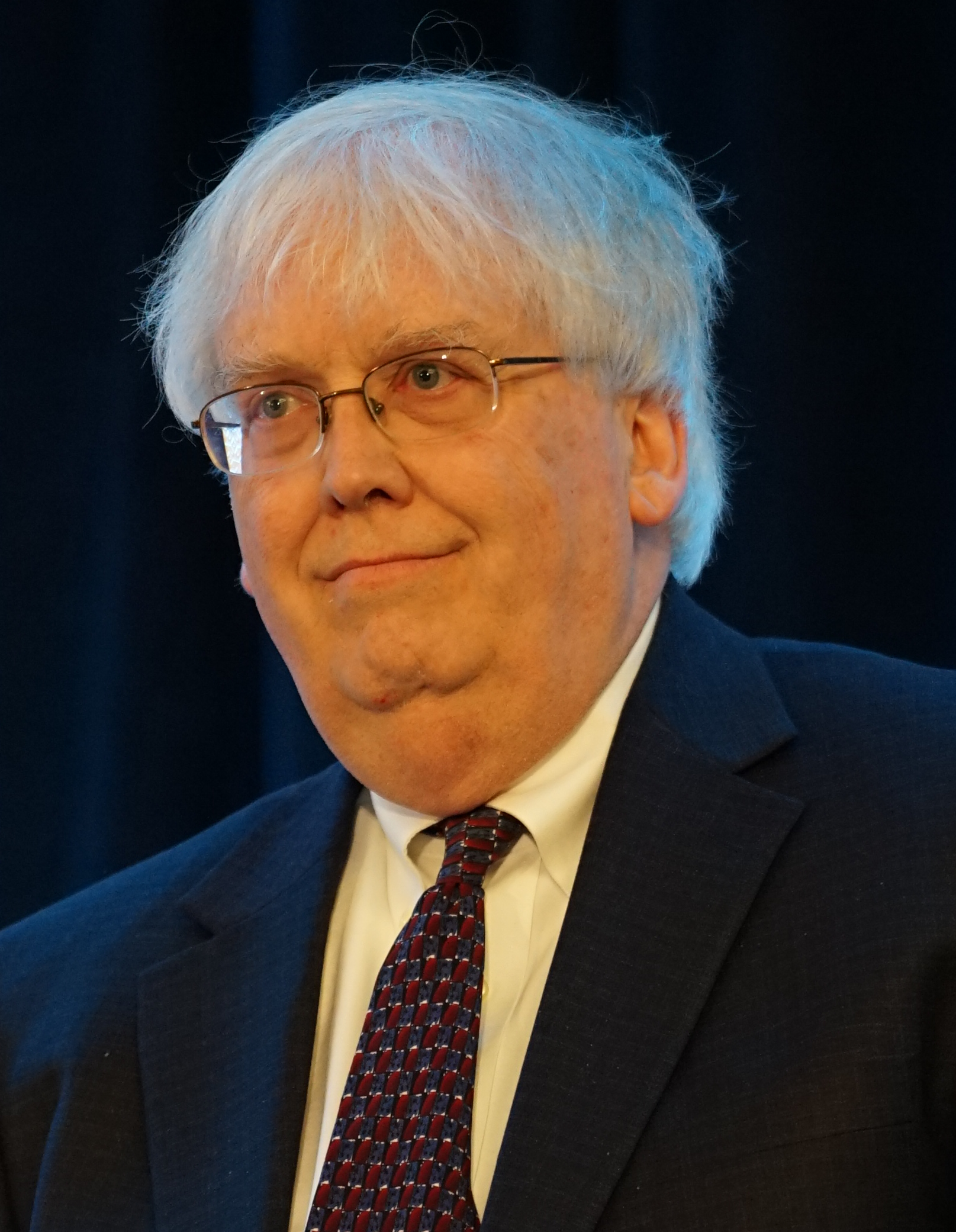
- Taylor at ASSA 2026
- Born: 1960 (age 65–66)

Academic background
- Education: Haverford College (BA); Stanford University (MA)

Academic work
- Institutions: Macalester College
- Notable ideas: Managing editor of the Journal of Economic Perspectives
- Awards: AEA Distinguished Fellow (2025)
- Website: timothytaylor.net

Timothy Taylor (born 1960) is an American economist. He is managing editor of the Journal of Economic Perspectives, a quarterly academic journal produced at Macalester College and published by the American Economic Association.

== Education and career ==
Taylor earned a bachelor's degree from Haverford College in 1982 and a master's degree in economics from Stanford University in 1984. He was an editorial writer for the San Jose Mercury News from 1984 to 1986. In 1986, he became managing editor of the Journal of Economic Perspectives, which the American Economic Association was then establishing.

From 1989 to 1997, Professor Taylor wrote an economics opinion column for the San Jose Mercury-News. He has published multiple lectures on economics through The Teaching Company. With Rudolph Penner and Isabel Sawhill, he is co-author of Updating America's Social Contract (2000), whose first chapter provided an early radical centrist perspective, "An Agenda for the Radical Middle".

Taylor is also the author of The Instant Economist: Everything You Need to Know About How the Economy Works, published by the Penguin Group in 2012. The fourth edition of Taylor's Principles of Economics textbook was published by Textbook Media in 2017.

In 2025, the American Economic Association named Taylor a Distinguished Fellow, an award recognizing lifetime contributions to economics.
