= Jeffrey R. Kling =

American economist

Academic background
- Education: Harvard College, Massachusetts Institute of Technology, Ph.D. Economics, 1998
- Doctoral advisor: Joshua Angrist; Jerry A. Hausman
- Website: Information at IDEAS / RePEc

Jeffrey Richard Kling is the research director at the Congressional Budget Office, and was previously the associate director for economic analysis. Kling was a faculty research fellow at the National Bureau of Economic Research and a senior investigator for the long-term evaluation of the Moving to Opportunity randomized housing mobility experiment. Kling is a co-editor of the Journal of Economic Perspectives

== Career ==
He previously served as deputy director of the Economic Studies Program and Joseph A. Pechman Senior Fellow at The Brookings Institution (2005–09). He also previously served as an assistant professor in the Department of Economics and Woodrow Wilson School of Public and International Affairs at Princeton University (1998–2005), Special Assistant to the U.S. Secretary of Labor (1993), and assistant to the Chief Economist at The World Bank (1992–93).

== Selected bibliography ==
=== Books ===
- Kling, Jeffrey R.; Mullainathan, Sendhil; Congdon, William J. (2012). Policy and choice: public finance through the lens of behavioral economics. Washington: Brookings Institution Press. ISBN 9780815722588.

=== Papers ===
- Kling, Jeffrey R.; Katz, Lawrence F.; Ludwig, Jens (2005). "Neighborhood Effects on Crime for Female and Male Youth: Evidence from a Randomized Housing Voucher Experiment" (PDF). Quarterly Journal of Economics. 120 (1): 87–130. doi:10.1162/0033553053327470. S2CID 12463746.
