= Natural experiment =

Empirical study

A natural experiment is a study in which individuals are exposed to experimental and control conditions that are determined by nature or by other factors outside the control of the investigators. The exposure process may resemble random assignment. Thus, natural experiments are observational studies and are not controlled in the traditional sense of a randomized experiment (an intervention study).

Natural experiments are generally more reliable when there is a clearly defined exposure or intervention that affects a well-defined subpopulation (with a comparable subpopulation remaining unexposed), such that differences in outcomes may be attributed to the exposure or intervention. In this sense, the difference between a natural experiment and a non-experimental observational study is that the former includes a comparison of conditions that pave the way for causal inference, but the latter does not.

Natural experiments are employed as study designs when controlled experimentation is extremely difficult to implement or unethical, such as in several research areas addressed by epidemiology (like evaluating the health impact of varying degrees of exposure to ionizing radiation in people living near Hiroshima at the time of the atomic blast) and economics (like estimating the economic return on amount of schooling in US adults).

== History ==
John Snow's map showing the clustering of cholera cases in Soho during the London epidemic of 1854

One of the best-known early natural experiments was the 1854 Broad Street cholera outbreak in London, England. On 31 August 1854, a major outbreak of cholera struck Soho. Over the next three days, 127 people near Broad Street died. By the end of the outbreak 616 people died. The physician John Snow identified the source of the outbreak as the nearest public water pump, using a map of deaths and illness that revealed a cluster of cases around the pump.

In this example, Snow discovered a strong association between the use of the water from the pump, and deaths and illnesses due to cholera. Snow found that the Southwark and Vauxhall Waterworks Company, which supplied water to districts with high attack rates, obtained the water from the Thames downstream from where raw sewage was discharged into the river. By contrast, districts that were supplied water by the Lambeth Waterworks Company, which obtained water upstream from the points of sewage discharge, had low attack rates. Given the near-haphazard patchwork development of the water supply in mid-nineteenth century London, Snow viewed the developments as "an experiment...on the grandest scale." Of course, the exposure to the polluted water was not under the control of any scientist. Therefore, this exposure has been recognized as being a natural experiment.

== Recent examples ==
=== Family size ===
An aim of a 1998 study was to estimate the effect of family size on the labor market outcomes of the mother. For at least two reasons, the correlations between family size and various outcomes (e.g., earnings) do not inform us about how family size causally affects labor market outcomes. First, both labor market outcomes and family size may be affected by unobserved "third" variables (e.g., personal preferences). Second, labor market outcomes themselves may affect family size (called reverse causality). For example, a woman may defer having a child if she gets a raise at work. The authors observed that two-child families with either two boys or two girls are substantially more likely to have a third child than two-child families with one boy and one girl. The sex of the first two children, then, serves as a natural experiment: it is as if an experimenter had randomly assigned some families to have two children and others to have three. The authors were then able to credibly estimate the causal effect of having a third child on labor market outcomes. Angrist and Evans found that childbearing had a greater impact on poor and less educated women than on highly educated women although the earnings impact of having a third child tended to disappear by that child's 13th birthday. They also found that having a third child had little impact on husbands' earnings.

=== Game shows ===
Within economics, game shows are a frequently studied form of natural experiment. While game shows might seem to be artificial contexts, they can be considered natural experiments due to the fact that the context arises without interference of the scientist. Game shows have been used to study a wide range of different types of economic behavior, such as decision making under risk and cooperative behavior.

=== Smoking ban ===
In Helena, Montana a smoking ban was in effect in all public spaces, including bars and restaurants, during the six-month period from June 2002 to December 2002. Helena is geographically isolated and served by only one hospital. The investigators observed that the rate of heart attacks dropped by 40% while the smoking ban was in effect. Opponents of the law prevailed in getting the enforcement of the law suspended after six months, after which the rate of heart attacks went back up. This study was an example of a natural experiment, called a case-crossover experiment, where the exposure is removed for a time and then returned. The study also noted its own weaknesses which potentially suggest that the inability to control variables in natural experiments can impede investigators from drawing firm conclusions.'

=== Nuclear weapons testing ===
Nuclear weapons testing released large quantities of radioactive isotopes into the atmosphere, some of which could be incorporated into biological tissues. The release stopped after the Partial Nuclear Test Ban Treaty in 1963, which prohibited atmospheric nuclear tests. This resembled a large-scale pulse-chase experiment, but could not have been performed as a regular experiment in humans due to scientific ethics. Several types of observations were made possible (in people born before 1963), such as determination of the rate of replacement for cells in different human tissues.

=== Vietnam War draft ===
An important question in economics research is what determines earnings. In 1990, Angrist evaluated the effects of military service on lifetime earnings. Using statistical methods developed in econometrics, Angrist capitalized on the approximate random assignment of the Vietnam War draft lottery, and used it as an instrumental variable associated with eligibility (or non-eligibility) for military service. Because many factors might predict whether someone serves in the military, the draft lottery frames a natural experiment whereby those drafted into the military can be compared against those not drafted because the two groups should not differ substantially prior to military service. Angrist found that the earnings of veterans were, on average, about 15 percent less than the earnings of non-veterans.

=== Industrial melanism ===
With the Industrial Revolution in the nineteenth century, many species of moth, including the well-studied peppered moth, responded to the atmospheric pollution of sulphur dioxide and soot around cities with industrial melanism, a dramatic increase in the frequency of dark forms over the formerly abundant pale, speckled forms. In the twentieth century, as regulation improved and pollution fell, providing the conditions for a large-scale natural experiment, the trend towards industrial melanism was reversed, and melanic forms quickly became scarce. The effect led the evolutionary biologists L. M. Cook and J. R. G. Turner to conclude that "natural selection is the only credible explanation for the overall decline".

== See also ==
- Common garden experiment
- Quasi-experiment
