= Journal of Economic Perspectives =

- Discipline: Economics
- Language: English
- Edited by: Heidi Williams, Jeffrey Kling

Publication details
- History: 1987–present
- Publisher: American Economic Association (United States)
- Frequency: Quarterly

Standard abbreviations
- ISO 4: J. Econ. Perspect.

Indexing
- ISSN: 0895-3309 (print); 1944-7965 (web)
- LCCN: 88648124
- JSTOR: 08953309
- OCLC no.: 16474127

Links
- Journal homepage; Online archive

The Journal of Economic Perspectives (JEP) is an economic peer reviewed journal published by the American Economic Association. The journal was established in 1987. The JEP was founded by Joseph Stiglitz, Carl Shapiro, and Timothy Taylor.

It is oriented around the twin goals of "providing perspective on current economic research, and explaining how economics provides perspective on questions of general interest." According to its editors its purpose is:

1. to synthesize and integrate lessons learned from active lines of economic research;
2. to provide economic analysis of public policy issues; to encourage cross-fertilization of ideas among the fields of thinking;
3. to offer readers an accessible source for state-of-the-art economic thinking;
4. to suggest directions for future research;
5. to provide insights and readings for classroom use;
6. and to address issues relating to the economics profession.

Its current editors are Heidi Williams and Jeffrey Kling, and its managing editor is Timothy Taylor.
