= Jörn-Steffen Pischke =

Microeconometrician

Jörn-Steffen Pischke is a professor of economics at the London School of Economics. He is known for his work on Applied Econometrics.

== Selected publications ==
- Angrist, J. D., & Pischke, J. S. (2009). Mostly harmless econometrics: An empiricist's companion. Princeton University Press.
- Angrist, J. D., & Pischke, J. S. (2014). Mastering 'metrics': The path from cause to effect. Princeton University Press.
- Acemoglu, D., & Pischke, J. S. (1998). Why do firms train? Theory and evidence. The Quarterly Journal of Economics, 113(1), 79–119.
- Bakker, J.D., Maurer, S., Pischke, J.S., & Rauch, F. (2021). Of Mice and Merchants: Connectedness and the Location of Economic Activity in the Iron Age. Review of Economics and Statistics, 103(4), 652–665.
