= Edward E. Leamer =

American economist (1944–2025)

- Born: May 24, 1944
- Died: February 25, 2025 (aged 80); Los Angeles, California, U.S.

Academic background
- Education: Princeton University (BA); University of Michigan (MA, PhD)

Academic work
- Discipline: Econometrics
- Institutions: University of California, Los Angeles
- Website: Information at IDEAS / RePEc

Edward Emory Leamer (May 24, 1944 – February 25, 2025) was an American economist and academic. He was professor emeritus of economics and statistics at UCLA Anderson School of Management who was Chauncey J. Medberry Professor of Management and director of the UCLA Anderson Forecast.

== Life and career ==
Leamer attended Princeton (B.A., mathematics, 1966) and the University of Michigan (M.A., mathematics, Ph.D., economics, 1970).

Leamer was the author of five books and over 100 articles on a range of subjects especially including applied econometrics and quantitative international economics.

Leamer was the vice presidential nominee on Laurence Kotlikoff's independent ticket in the 2016 US presidential election.

Leamer was known amongst economists for his paper "Let's Take the Con Out of Econometrics", widely referred to as Leamer's critique, which is said to have catalyzed the implementation of more rigorous research designs in the economic sciences.

He was elected a fellow of the American Academy of Arts and Sciences and the Econometric Society. In honor of Leamer's championing of transparency in economic research, the Berkeley Initiative for Transparency in the Social Sciences in 2015 launched a three-year series of awards known as the Leamer–Rosenthal Prizes for Open Social Science (which also honored UC Riverside psychologist Robert Rosenthal) to recognize academics committed to engaging in transparent research practices and pioneering new methods to increase the rigor of research.

Leamer died at his home in Los Angeles on February 25, 2025, at the age of 80.

== Selected publications ==
Books

- 1970. Quantitative International Economics (with Robert M. Stern). Aldine Transaction. Description.
- 1978. Specification Searches: Ad Hoc Inference with Nonexperimental Data, Wiley. Chapter preview links.
- 1985. Sources of International Comparative Advantage: Theory and Evidence, MIT Press. Description.
- 2007. Handbook of Econometrics, Elsevier. Description and chapter-preview links for v. 6A & 6B (editor with James J. Heckman).
- 2009. Macroeconomic Patterns and Stories, Springer. ISBN 3540463887 Description and preview.
- 2012. The Craft of Economics: Lessons form the Heckscher-Ohlin Framework. The MIT Press.

Articles

- 1980. "The Leontief Paradox, Reconsidered," Journal of Political Economy, 88(3), pp. 495-503. Reprinted in Jagdish N. Bhagwati, ed., 1987, International Trade: Selected Readings, MIT Press. pp. 115- 124.
- 1983a. "Let's Take the Con Out of Econometrics," American Economic Review, 73(1), pp. 31-43.
- 1983b. "Reporting the Fragility of Regression Estimates," (with Herman Leonard), Review of Economics and Statistics, 65(2), pp. 306-317.
- 1985. "Sensitivity Analyses Would Help," American Economic Review, 75(3), pp. 308-313.
- 1995. "International Trade Theory: The Evidence," ch. 26, Handbook of International Economics, v. 3, pp. 1339–1394. Abstract.
- 1987. "Econometric Metaphors," in Advances in Econometrics, Truman F. Bewley, ed., Cambridge v. 2, pp. 1-28.
- 1999. "Effort, Wages and the International Division of Labor," Journal of Political Economy, Vol. 107, Number 6, Part 1.
- 2001. "The Economic Geography of the Internet Age," Journal of International Business Studies, 32, 4.
- 2007a. "Housing is the Business Cycle," in Housing, Housing Finance, and Monetary Policy, Federal Reserve Bank of Kansas City, pp. 149-233.
- 2007b. "Linking the Theory with the Data: That is the Core Problem of International Economics," ch. 67, Handbook of Econometrics, v. 6A, pp 4587–4606. Abstract.
- 2007c. "A Flat World, A Level Playing Field, A Small World After All, or None of the Above? A Review of Thomas L. Friedman's The World is Flat," Journal of Economic Literature.
- 2008. From The New Palgrave Dictionary of Economics. 2nd Edition. Abstract links:
  - "extreme bounds analysis"
  - "Leontief paradox"
  - "specification problems in econometrics".
- 2010. "Tantalus on the Road to Asymptopia," Journal of Economic Perspectives, 24(2), pp. 31-46.
