= Quasi-experiment =

Empirical interventional study

A quasi-experiment is a research design used to estimate the causal impact of an intervention. This research design is aimed at assessing the difference between outcomes (e.g., reading knowledge, depressive symptoms) in a group that experienced an intervention and a group that did not. The intervention is broadly construed such that it could be designed by researchers (e.g., a reading program) or it could be an event affecting a group of people such as disaster (e.g., an earthquake). Quasi-experiments share similarities with experiments and randomized controlled trials, but specifically lack random assignment to intervention and control conditions. Instead, quasi-experimental designs typically compare groups that are either preexisting (e.g., whether someone was exposed to COVID-19) or groups that were created without random assignment (e.g., students attending schools with different reading programs).

The causal analysis of quasi-experiments depends on assumptions that render non-randomness irrelevant, for example, the parallel trends assumption for difference-in-differences (DiD) method. Quasi-experiments are subject to concerns about internal validity. In other words, it may be difficult to convincingly demonstrate a causal link between the treatment and control conditions on the observed outcomes in quasi-experimental designs. This is particularly true if there are confounding variables that cannot be controlled or accounted for. A major impediment to drawing causal conclusions in quasi-experiments is the possibility that unmeasured variables could have contributed to treatment–control group differences in the outcomes, which is less a problem in true experiments because randomization largely equates the intervention and control groups on both measured and unmeasured background factors, particularly when there are large numbers of experimental units to randomize. The experimental units most commonly used in quasi-experimental research are humans although sometimes organizational units such as schools and divisions in an organization are employed.

== Design ==
The first part of creating a quasi-experimental design is to identify the variables. The quasi-independent variable is the variable that is manipulated in order to affect a dependent variable. In a time series analysis, the dependent variable is observed over time for any changes that may take place. One or more covariates are usually included in analyses, ideally variables that predict both group membership and the outcome. These are additional variables that are often used to address confounding, for example, by means of statistical adjustment or matching on an influential covariate. Once the variables have been identified and defined, experimental and control treatment procedures should then be implemented (assuming researchers are not studying nonmanipulable events like natural disasters) and group differences should be assessed.

In an experiment with random assignment, study units would have approximately the same probability of being assigned to the treatment and control conditions. As such, an aim of random assignment is to make the experimental and control groups as equivalent as possible by distributing known and unknown confounds evenly across treatments. In contrast, in a quasi-experimental design, assignment to a given treatment condition is based on something other than random assignment. Depending on the type of quasi-experimental design, the researcher might have control over assignment to the treatment condition but use some criteria other than random assignment (e.g., a cutoff score on a reading test) to determine which participants are placed in the treatment and control conditions. Factors such as cost, feasibility, political concerns, or convenience may influence how or if participants are assigned to a given treatment conditions. Consequently, quasi-experiments, compared to true experiments, are subject to more concerns regarding internal validity.

Many quasi-experiments use the "pre-post testing". This means that participants are assessed before they are exposed to the treatment and control conditions. And they are tested after the treatment and control conditions have been implemented. Pre-testing helps researchers identify confounds such as members of one group being heavier than another in a diet study. If there are group differences on an important covariariate measured (e.g., weight, BMI) at the pre-test stage, the researcher can statistically control for that covariate after the post-test data have been collected.

There are several types of quasi-experimental designs, each with different strengths, weaknesses and applications. These designs include (but are not limited to):

- Difference in differences (pre-post with-without comparison)
  - Event study
- Nonequivalent control groups design
  - no-treatment control group designs
  - nonequivalent dependent variables designs
  - removed treatment group designs
  - repeated treatment designs
  - reversed treatment nonequivalent control groups designs
  - cohort designs
  - post-test only designs
  - regression continuity designs
- Regression discontinuity design
- Case-control design
  - time-series designs
  - multiple time series design
  - interrupted time series design
  - instrumental variables
- Panel analysis

Of all of these designs, the regression discontinuity design comes the closest to the experimental design, as the experimenter maintains control of the treatment assignment and it is known to "yield an unbiased estimate of the treatment effects". It does, however, require large numbers of study participants and precise modeling of the functional form between the assignment and the outcome variable, in order to yield the same power as a traditional experimental design.

Though quasi-experiments are sometimes shunned by those who consider themselves to be experimental purists (leading Donald T. Campbell to coin the term "queasy experiments" for them), they can be useful in areas where it is not feasible or desirable to conduct an experiment or randomized control trial. Such instances include evaluating the impact of public policy changes, educational interventions or large scale health interventions. The primary drawback of quasi-experimental designs is that they cannot eliminate the possibility of confounding bias, which can hinder one's ability to draw causal inferences. This drawback is often used as an excuse to discount quasi-experimental results. However, such bias can be controlled for by using various statistical techniques such as multiple regression, if one can identify and measure the confounding variable(s). Such techniques can be used to model and partial out the effects of confounding variables techniques, thereby improving the accuracy of the results obtained from quasi-experiments. Moreover, the developing use of propensity score matching to match participants on variables important to the treatment selection process can also improve the accuracy of quasi-experimental results. In fact, data derived from quasi-experimental analyses has been shown to closely match experimental data in certain cases, even when different criteria were used. In sum, quasi-experiments are a valuable tool, especially for the applied researcher. On their own, quasi-experimental designs do not allow one to make definitive causal inferences; however, they provide necessary and valuable information that cannot be obtained by experimental methods alone. Shadish et al. (2002) suggested that researchers, especially those interested in investigating applied research questions, move beyond the traditional experimental design and avail themselves of the possibilities inherent in quasi-experimental designs.

== Ethics ==
A true experiment would, for example, randomly assign children to a scholarship, in order to control for all other variables. Quasi-experiments are commonly used in social sciences, public health, education, and policy analysis, especially when it is not practical or reasonable to randomize study participants to the treatment condition.

As an example, suppose we divide households into two categories: Households in which the parents spank their children, and households in which the parents do not spank their children. We can run a linear regression to determine if there is a positive correlation between parents' spanking and their children's aggressive behavior. However, to simply randomize parents to spanking or not spanking categories may not be practical or ethical, because some parents may believe it is morally wrong to spank their children and refuse to participate.

Some authors distinguish between a natural experiment and a "quasi-experiment". A natural experiment may approximate random assignment, or involve real randomization not by the experimenters or for the experiment. A quasi-experiment generally does not involve actual randomization.

Quasi-experiments have outcome measures, treatments, and experimental units, but do not use random assignment. Quasi-experiments are often the design that most people choose over true experiments. It is usually easily conducted as opposed to true experiments, because they bring in features from both experimental and non-experimental designs. Measured variables as well as manipulated variables can be brought in. Usually quasi-experiments are chosen by experimenters because they maximize internal and external validity.

== Advantages ==
Since quasi-experimental designs are used when randomization is impractical and/or unethical, they are typically easier to set up than true experimental designs, which require random assignment of subjects. Additionally, utilizing quasi-experimental designs minimizes threats to ecological validity as natural environments do not suffer the same problems of artificiality as compared to a well-controlled laboratory setting. Since quasi-experiments are natural experiments, findings in one may be applied to other subjects and settings, allowing for some generalizations to be made about population. Also, this experimentation method is efficient in longitudinal research that involves longer time periods which can be followed up in different environments.

Other advantages of quasi experiments include the idea of having any manipulations the experimenter so chooses. In natural experiments, the researchers have to let manipulations occur on their own and have no control over them whatsoever. Also, using self selected groups in quasi experiments also takes away the chance of ethical, conditional, etc. concerns while conducting the study.

== Disadvantages ==
Quasi-experimental estimates of impact are subject to contamination by confounding variables. In the example above, a variation in the children's response to spanking is plausibly influenced by factors that cannot be easily measured and controlled, for example the child's intrinsic wildness or the parent's irritability. The lack of random assignment in the quasi-experimental design method may allow studies to be more feasible, but this also poses many challenges for the investigator in terms of internal validity. This deficiency in randomization makes it harder to rule out confounding variables and introduces new threats to internal validity. Because randomization is absent, some knowledge about the data can be approximated, but conclusions of causal relationships are difficult to determine due to a variety of extraneous and confounding variables that exist in a social environment. Moreover, even if these threats to internal validity are assessed, causation still cannot be fully established because the experimenter does not have total control over extraneous variables.

Disadvantages also include the study groups may provide weaker evidence because of the lack of randomness. Randomness brings a lot of useful information to a study because it broadens results and therefore gives a better representation of the population as a whole. Using unequal groups can also be a threat to internal validity. If groups are not equal, which is sometimes the case in quasi experiments, then the experimenter might not be positive about determining the causes of the results.

== Internal validity ==
Internal validity is the approximate truth about inferences regarding cause-effect or causal relationships. This is why validity is important for quasi experiments because they are all about causal relationships. It occurs when the experimenter tries to control all variables that could affect the results of the experiment. Statistical regression, history and the participants are all possible threats to internal validity. The question you would want to ask while trying to keep internal validity high is "Are there any other possible reasons for the outcome besides the reason I want it to be?" If so, then internal validity might not be as strong.

== External validity ==
External validity is the extent to which the results obtained from a study sample can be generalized "to" some well-specified population of interest, and "across" subpopulations of people, times, contexts, and methods of study. Lynch has argued that generalizing "to" a population is almost never possible because the populations to which we would like to project are measures of future behavior, which by definition cannot be sampled. Therefore, the more relevant question is whether treatment effects generalize "across" subpopulations that vary on background factors that might not be salient to the researcher. External validity depends on whether the treatments studies have homogeneous effects across different subsets of people, times, contexts, and methods of study or whether the sign and magnitude of any treatment effects changes across subsets in ways that may not be acknowledged or understood by the researchers. Athey and Imbens and Athey and Wager have pioneered machine learning techniques for inductive understanding of heterogeneous treatment effects.

== Design types ==
"Person-by-treatment" designs are the most common type of quasi experiment design. In this design, the experimenter measures at least one independent variable. Along with measuring one variable, the experimenter will also manipulate a different independent variable. Because there is manipulating and measuring of different independent variables, the research is mostly done in laboratories. An important factor in dealing with person-by-treatment designs is that random assignment will need to be used in order to make sure that the experimenter has complete control over the manipulations that are being done to the study.

An example of this type of design was performed at the University of Notre Dame. The study was conducted to see if being mentored for one's job led to increased job satisfaction. The results showed that many people who did have a mentor showed very high job satisfaction. However, the study also showed that those who did not receive the mentor also had a high number of satisfied employees. Seibert concluded that although the workers who had mentors were happy, he could not assume that the reason for it was the mentors themselves because of the numbers of the high number of non-mentored employees that said they were satisfied. This is why prescreening is very important so that you can minimize any flaws in the study before they are seen.

Natural experiments constitute a different type of quasi-experimental design. The design differs from the standard type of quasi-experiment in which the research team assigns pre-existing nonrandomized groups of individuals to intervention/treatment and control conditions. Without randomization, confidence that the groups are equivalent on all relevant background factors is at best very weak. The natural experiment mimics the randomization found in true experiments and the occurrences under study occur naturally. Capitalizing on naturally occurring events, for example, can be helpful in studying the impact of traumatic events on individuals.
