= Petra Todd =

American economist

Petra Elisabeth Todd

Academic background
- Education: University of Virginia; University of Chicago
- Academic advisors: James Heckman; Hidehiko Ichimura; Derek Allen Neal

Academic work
- Institutions: University of Pennsylvania
- Website: Information at IDEAS / RePEc

Petra Elisabeth (Crockett) Todd is an American economist whose research interests include labor economics, development economics, microeconomics, and econometrics. She is the Edward J. and Louise W. Kahn Term Professor of Economics at the University of Pennsylvania, and is also affiliated with the University of Pennsylvania Population Studies Center, the Human Capital and Equal Opportunity Global Working Group (HCEO), the IZA Institute of Labor Economics and the National Bureau of Economic Research.

== Education and career ==
Petra Todd graduated from the University of Virginia in 1989 with a double major in economics and English. She did her graduate studies in economics at the University of Chicago, completing her Ph.D. in 1996. Her dissertation, Three Essays on Empirical Methods for Evaluating the Impact of Policy Interventions in Education and Training, was jointly supervised by James Heckman, Hidehiko Ichimura, and Derek Allen Neal.

She has been a faculty member at the University of Pennsylvania since 1996. She was promoted to associate professor with tenure in 2002 and to full professor in 2006. She held the named chair of Alfred L. Cass Term Chair Professor of Economics from 2010 to 2016, and was given the Kahn Professorship in 2017.

Todd is a fellow of the Econometric Society (2009), the Society of Labor Economists (2010), and the International Association for Applied Econometrics.

== Research ==
Petra Todd is an empirical economist with research contributions in the area of labor economics, economics of education, development, econometrics, criminology and demography. She is best known for her work on program evaluation methods, which develops methods for evaluating the effects of interventions in education and training using both experimental and nonexperimental data. She recently finished a book manuscript Impact Evaluation in Developing Countries: Theory, Methods and Practice, coauthored with Paul Glewwe, that will be published by the World Bank in 2020.

One of Petra Todd's areas of expertise is matching methods. These statistics/econometric techniques are often used to evaluate the impact of Active Labor Market programs, which are government programs that provide education, training and incentives for unemployed or out of labor force workers to gain employment. In developing country settings, the methods are often used to evaluate the effectiveness of anti-poverty programs, such as conditional cash transfer programs. In early work, Todd and coauthors (Heckman, Ichimura & Todd 1997; Heckman, Ichimura & Todd 1998) proposed new nonparametric matching estimators that are now widely used.

Petra Todd has also written seminal papers on regression discontinuity (RD) methods. RD is a quasi-experimental design where there is a variable and a cut-off value that wholly or partly determines treatment assignment. For example, children whose pre-test score falls below a threshold may be assigned to an educational intervention. One of the earliest papers on the use of RD methods in economics is Hahn, Todd & Van der Klaauw (2001), which develops new nonparametric estimators and shows that RD has an interpretation of a local average treatment effect in a heterogeneous treatment effects setting.

Other topics in her work concerns reducing structural inequality in education, particularly in developing countries, through an educational policy that aims at improving the education of the least-well-served students. In particular she has studied the effects of programs like that provide cash incentives for poor families to send their children to school. She was an expert consultant in designing the Mexican Progresa experiment (later called Oportunidades) that randomized 506 rural villages in or out of a conditional transfer program. Experimental evidence on the effectiveness of Progresa in increasing schooling and improving health was important to the adoption of similar anti-poverty programs in more than 60 countries around the world (Parker & Todd 2017). Petra Todd also played a key role in the design of the ALI experiment in Mexico that randomized 88 high schools to a student and teacher incentive program that paid for improvement on mathematics curriculum tests. The program impacts are analyzed in Behrman et al. (2015) and the data are used to study the determinants of educational performance in Todd and Wolpin (2018).

Todd also has research on testing for racial profiling in the context of motor vehicle searches. Knowles, Persico & Todd (2001) observed that African-American motorists were more than three times as likely as other motorists to be stopped and searched by Maryland police, but had drugs found in the search with the same likelihood as other motorists. Todd and her coauthors argued from this data that African-Americans had a higher propensity than others to carry drugs, that the greater number of stops were causing them to carry drugs less often, and that the equal rate of drugs found (rather than an even lower rate for African-Americans than others) was evidence that the police were not being racist in their more frequent stops.

Petra Todd has written chapters in the Handbook of Econometrics (with Hidehiko Ichimura), Handbook of Development Economics, Handbook of Education Economics (with James Heckman and Lance Lochner), and Handbook of Labor Economics (with Michael Keane and Kenneth Wolpin).

In recent research, Petra Todd uses dynamic discrete choice structural modeling methods for predicting the impacts of programs that do not yet exist, which is very useful at the stage of designing a new social program or in considering changes to an existing program. Another focus is on the empirical modeling of household behaviors, such as choices about fertility, schooling, employment and savings. Todd also some recent published papers that analyze the role of personality traits in educational and working decisions and in time allocation of husbands and wives.

== Selected publications ==
- Heckman, J. J.; Ichimura, H.; Todd, P. E. (October 1, 1997). "Matching As An Econometric Evaluation Estimator: Evidence from Evaluating a Job Training Programme". The Review of Economic Studies. 64 (4). Oxford University Press: 605–654. doi:10.2307/2971733. ISSN 0034-6527. JSTOR 2971733.
- Heckman, James J.; Ichimura, Hidehiko; Todd, Petra (1998). "Matching As An Econometric Evaluation Estimator". Review of Economic Studies. 65 (2). Oxford University Press: 261–294. doi:10.1111/1467-937x.00044. ISSN 0034-6527.
- Hahn, Jinyong; Todd, Petra; Van der Klaauw, Wilbert (2001). "Identification and Estimation of Treatment Effects with a Regression-Discontinuity Design". Econometrica. 69 (1). The Econometric Society: 201–209. doi:10.1111/1468-0262.00183. ISSN 0012-9682.
- Knowles, John; Persico, Nicola; Todd, Petra (2001). "Racial Bias in Motor Vehicle Searches: Theory and Evidence" (PDF). Journal of Political Economy. 109 (1). University of Chicago Press: 203–229. doi:10.1086/318603. ISSN 0022-3808. S2CID 15319269.
- Behrman, Jere R.; Parker, Susan W.; Todd, Petra E.; Wolpin, Kenneth I. (2015). "Aligning Learning Incentives of Students and Teachers: Results from a Social Experiment in Mexican High Schools" (PDF). Journal of Political Economy. 123 (2). University of Chicago Press: 325–364. doi:10.1086/675910. hdl:1911/94787. ISSN 0022-3808. S2CID 333447.
- Parker, Susan W.; Todd, Petra E. (2017). "Conditional Cash Transfers: The Case of Progresa/Oportunidades". Journal of Economic Literature. 55 (3). American Economic Association: 866–915. doi:10.1257/jel.20151233. ISSN 0022-0515.
