= Sally Thurston =

American statistician

Sarah (Sally) Newcomb Whitney Thurston (born 1956) is an American biostatistician and environmental statistician whose research involves the application of Bayesian hierarchical modeling to problems in environmental health, including work on endocrine disruptors, the effects of mercury in fish on prenatal development, and the health effects of air pollution. She is a professor of biostatistics and a professor of environmental science in the Department of Biostatistics and Computational Biology at the University of Rochester Medical Center.

== Education and career ==
Thurston majored in biology at Oberlin College, graduating in 1978. After earning a master's degree in natural resources from Cornell University in 1991, she went to Harvard University for doctoral study in statistics. She earned a second master's degree in 1992 before completing her Ph.D. in 1997. Her doctoral dissertation, Error Analysis of Food Stamp Microsimulation Models, was jointly advised by Alan M. Zaslavsky and Donald Rubin.

She stayed at Harvard as a postdoctoral research fellow (1997–2000) and research associate (2000–2002) before moving to her present position at the University of Rochester in 2002. She added a second affiliation in oncology in 2005, and was tenured in 2008.

== Personal life ==
Thurston is the daughter of mathematician Hassler Whitney. Her mother Mary Barnett Garfield was a granddaughter of Harry Augustus Garfield and great-granddaughter of James A. Garfield.

== Recognition ==
Thurston became an Elected Member of the International Statistical Institute in 2006. She is a Fellow of the American Statistical Association, elected in 2019.
