= Alberto Abadie =

Spanish economist and academic (born 1968)

- Born: April 3, 1968 (age 58); Basque Country, Spain
- Spouse: Judith Lok

Academic background
- Education: Massachusetts Institute of Technology (PhD); CEMFI (MA); University of the Basque Country (BA)
- Doctoral advisor: Joshua Angrist; Whitney K. Newey

Academic work
- Discipline: Econometrics; Causal inference Program evaluation
- Institutions: Massachusetts Institute of Technology; Harvard University
- Notable ideas: Synthetic controls
- Website: Information at IDEAS / RePEc

Alberto Abadie (born April 3, 1968) is a Spanish economist who has served as a professor of economics at the Massachusetts Institute of Technology since 2016, where he is also Associate Director of the Institute for Data, Systems, and Society (IDSS). He is principally known for his work in econometrics and empirical microeconomics, and is a specialist in causal inference and program evaluation. He has made fundamental contributions to important areas in econometrics and statistics, including treatment effect models, instrumental variable estimation, matching estimators, difference in differences, and synthetic controls.

== Biography ==
Born in the Basque Country in 1968, Abadie received a BA in economics from the Universidad del País Vasco in 1992, where he specialized in mathematical economics and econometrics. He received an MA in economics from the Centro de Estudios Monetarios y Financieros in 1995, and a PhD in economics from the Massachusetts Institute of Technology in 1999, where his doctoral advisers were Joshua Angrist and Whitney K. Newey. Abadie was appointed an assistant professor of public policy at Harvard University in 1999, where he became an associate professor in 2004, and a full professor in 2005. He returned to the Department of Economics at his alma mater, MIT, in 2016, where he is currently a professor of economics, and Associate Director of the Institute for Data, Systems, and Society (IDSS).

== Career ==
Abadie has been a research associate at the NBER since 2009, where he was a faculty research fellow within its Labor Studies Program from 2002 to 2009. He co-edited the Review of Economics and Statistics from 2007 to 2011, and has served as an associate editor of several academic journals, including Econometrica. He was elected a Fellow of the Econometric Society in 2016, and was elected to the American Academy of Arts and Sciences in 2022.
