= Rajeev Dehejia =

Rajeev H. Dehejia
- Born: 1973 (age 52–53)

Academic background
- Education: Harvard University (Ph.D.); Carleton University (B.A.)
- Doctoral advisor: Gary Chamberlain; Guido Imbens; Lawrence F. Katz; Edward Glaeser

Academic work
- Discipline: Labor economics, Econometrics, Development economics
- Institutions: New York University
- Website: Information at IDEAS / RePEc

Rajeev Dehejia is a professor of public policy in the Robert F. Wagner Graduate School of Public Service at New York University. He is the author of numerous academic articles in econometrics, labor economics, and development economics, including two widely cited papers on the evaluation of propensity score matching. He graduated in 1992 from Carleton University with the Governor General's Medal. He completed his Ph.D. in economics from Harvard University in 1997. From 2007-2015, he served as co-editor of the Journal of Human Resources. From 2016-2018, he served as the co-editor of the Journal of Business and Economic Statistics.
