= Elizabeth A. Stuart =

Professor of mental health, biostatistics

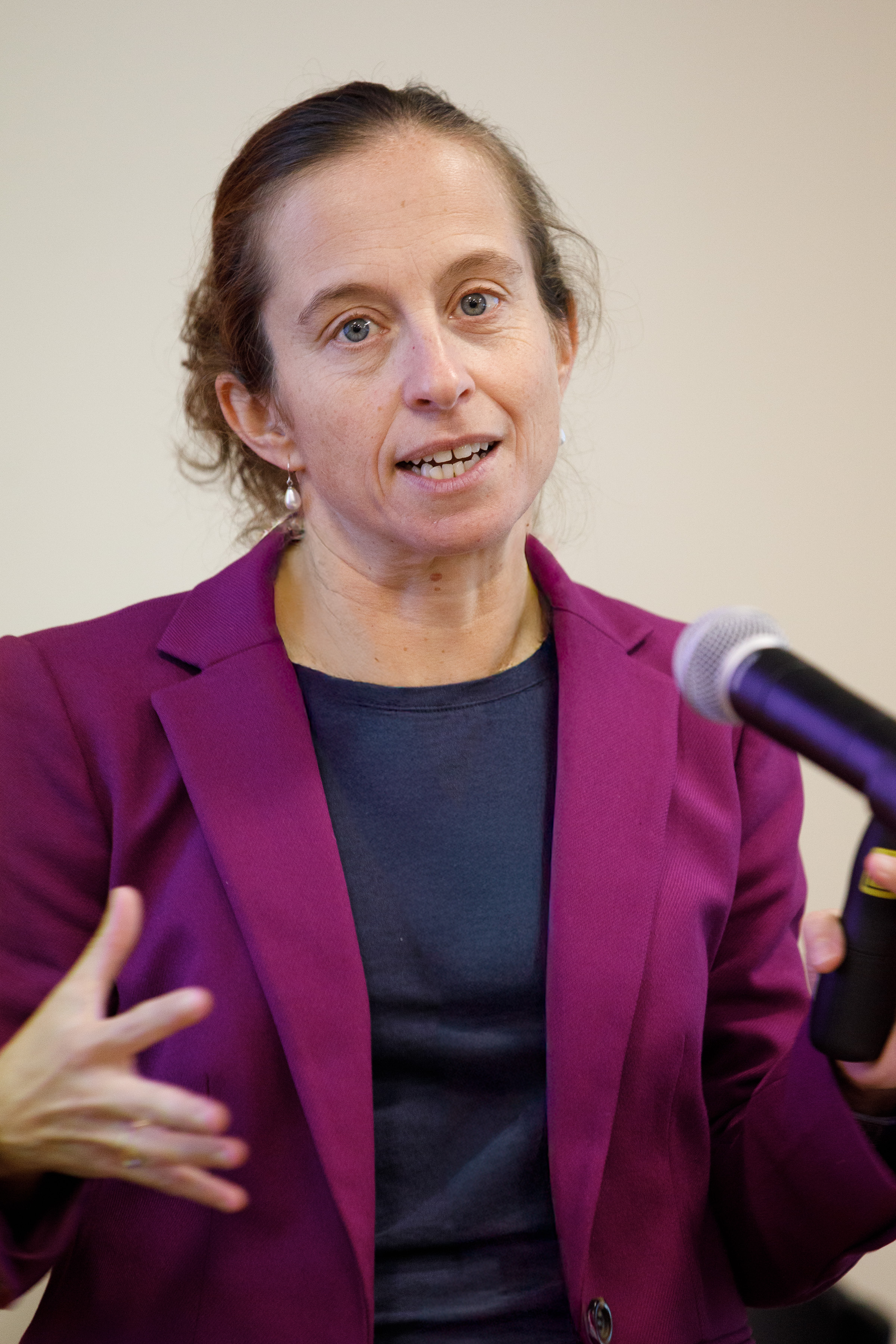
- Born: September 2, 1975 (age 50); Sydney, Australia
- Education: Harvard University; Smith College
- Scientific career
- Fields: Statistics
- Workplaces: Mathematica Policy Research; Johns Hopkins Bloomberg School of Public Health

Elizabeth A. Stuart is a professor of mental health, biostatistics, and health policy and management in the Johns Hopkins Bloomberg School of Public Health. Her research involves causal inference and missing data in the statistics of mental health. She was a co-author on a study showing that post-suicide-attempt counseling can significantly reduce the risk of future suicide.

== Education and career ==
Stuart graduated from Smith College in 1997, with a mathematics major and chemistry minor. She completed her Ph.D. at Harvard University in 2004, in statistics, under the supervision of Donald Rubin. After working for two years as a researcher at Mathematica Policy Research, she joined the Johns Hopkins faculty in 2006. In 2023, she was promoted to The Frank Hurley and Catharine Dorrier Professor and Chair of the Hopkins Biostatistics department.

== Recognition ==
In 2014 she was elected as a Fellow of the American Statistical Association "for outstanding contributions to research in the estimation of causal effects; for extensive efforts in the dissemination of statistical methods in education and mental health, including the development of widely used software; and for extensive service to the ASA and the profession." In 2020, she was elected Fellow of the American Association for the Advancement of Science, in the Section on Statistics. In 2020, she became a Bloomberg Professor of American Health.
