= Pedro H.C. Sant'Anna =

- Occupation: Associate professor at Emory University

Academic background
- Education: Universidad Carlos III de Madrid

Academic work
- Discipline: Econometrician
- Sub-discipline: Difference in differences, Causal inference
- Institutions: Emory University, formerly Vanderbilt University

Pedro H.C. Sant'Anna is an associate professor of economics at Emory University. His areas of research primarily concern difference in differences and other quasi-experimental methods used for causal inference.

== Education and career ==
In 2009, Sant'Anna received his bachelor's degree in economics from Ibmec, a university in Brazil. He then received a master's degree in 2011, and a PhD in 2015, from Charles III University of Madrid, also in the subject of economics. He then worked at Vanderbilt University as an assistant professor, before becoming an associate professor at Emory University.

== Research ==
Sant'Anna's research spans multiple areas of econometrics. Along with Brantly Callaway, Sant'Anna developed a variation of difference in differences intended to work with multiple time periods, conditioning on observed covariates, and treatment being implemented in different time periods. This paper also includes a discussion of how the Callaway-Sant'Anna estimator finds different results than a two-way fixed effects model of minimum wage policies on teen employment.

=== Coding ===
Sant'Anna has developed packages for R, including the did package, which implements the Callaway-Sant'Anna estimator for difference-in-difference models. Another of his packages is DRDID, which implements a doubly-robust difference-in-differences estimator that he developed together with Jun Zhao.
