= Donald Rubin =

American statistician (born 1943)

Donald Bruce Rubin
- Born: Donald Bruce Rubin; December 22, 1943 (age 82); Washington, D.C., U.S.
- Education: Princeton University (BA); Harvard University (MA, PhD)
- Known for: Rubin causal model Expectation–maximization algorithm
- Scientific career
- Fields: Statistics
- Workplaces: Educational Testing Service; Princeton University; University of Wisconsin–Madison; University of Chicago; Harvard University; Tsinghua University; Temple University
- Thesis: The Use of Matched Sampling and Regression Adjustment in Observational Studies (1971)
- Doctoral advisor: William Gemmell Cochran
- Doctoral students: Andrew Gelman; Jennifer Hill; Xiao-Li Meng; Elizabeth A. Stuart; Sally Thurston; Xinran Li

Donald Bruce Rubin (born December 22, 1943) is an American statistician, and Emeritus Professor of Statistics at Harvard University, where he chaired the department of statistics for 13 years. He also works at Tsinghua University in China and at Temple University in Philadelphia.

He is most well known for the Rubin causal model, a set of methods designed for causal inference with observational data, and for his methods for dealing with missing data.

== Biography ==
Rubin was born in Washington, D.C. into a Jewish family of lawyers. As an undergraduate, Rubin attended the accelerated Princeton University PhD program where he was one of a cohort of 20 students mentored by the physicist John Wheeler (the intention of the program was to confer degrees within 5 years of freshman matriculation). He switched to psychology and graduated in 1965. He began graduate school in psychology at Harvard with a National Science Foundation fellowship, but because his statistics background was considered insufficient, he was asked to take introductory statistics courses.

Rubin became a PhD student again, this time in statistics under William Cochran at the Harvard Statistics Department. After graduating from Harvard in 1970, he began working at the Educational Testing Service in 1971 and served as a visiting faculty member at Princeton's new statistics department. He published his major papers on the Rubin causal model in 1974–1980, seminal papers on propensity score matching in the early 1980s with Paul Rosenbaum, and a textbook on the subject with Nobel Prize-winning econometrician Guido Imbens in 2015.

In 1977, he was elected as a Fellow of the American Statistical Association. In 2007, Rubin was awarded the George W. Snedecor Award by the Committee of Presidents of Statistical Societies.
