= Observational study =

Study with uncontrolled variable of interest

An observational study is a type of research design in which outcomes are measured to identify patterns or associations without attempts by the investigator to manipulate variables or conditions.

Observational studies are commonly used in fields such as medicine, epidemiology, psychology, sociology, and statistics.

Observational studies are one of two types of clinical study design, which can be either experimental or observational. In an experimental study, particularly a randomized controlled trial (RTC), test subjects are randomly assigned to either a treatment group (who receive the intervention or treatment being studied, i.e. the independent variable) or a control group (who do not), and the researcher compares the outcomes of the two groups. By contrast, in an observational study, the researcher does not determine the assignment of subjects, and there may not be a control group; if there is a control group, assignment of the independent variable is not under the control of the researcher.

Although such studies can be rigorously designed, due to the lack of a random assignment mechanism, observational studies naturally present difficulties for inferential analysis, are susceptible to confounding and bias, and produce a lower quality of evidence than RTCs.

An observational study might be performed if an RCT is unethical, impractical, or outside the control of the investigator. Observational studies are often pragmatic, being designed to show real-world effectiveness without attempting to understand underlying mechanisms. Indeed, regardless of its quality, an observational study cannot, on its own, establish causality.

== Motivations ==
The independent variable may be beyond the control of the investigator for a variety of reasons, for instance:

- Conducting an RCT may violate ethical standards. For instance, in a hypothetical trial seeking to prove that smoking cigarettes causes lung cancer, it would be unethical to randomly assign a group of participants to smoke. (However, observational studies are not automatically free of ethical considerations, and, depending on the study design, may still put participants at risk of harm; for instance they may involve an invasive or high-risk means of collecting data from participants.)
- The researcher may lack control over the situation. Suppose a scientist wants to study the public health effects of a community-wide ban on smoking in public indoor areas. In a controlled experiment, the investigator would randomly pick a set of communities to be in the treatment group. However, it is typically up to each community and/or its legislature to enact a smoking ban. The investigator can be expected to lack the political power to cause precisely those communities in the randomly selected treatment group to pass a smoking ban. In an observational study, the investigator would typically start with a treatment group consisting of those communities where a smoking ban is already in effect.
- A randomized experiment may be impractical. Suppose a researcher wants to study the suspected link between a certain medication and a very rare group of symptoms arising as a side effect. Setting aside any ethical considerations, a randomized experiment may not be practical due to rare outcomes. There may not be a subject pool large enough for the symptoms to be observed in at least one treated subject. An observational study would typically start with a group of symptomatic subjects and work backwards to find those who were given the medication and later developed the symptoms. So the treated group is identified based on symptoms, instead of by random assignment.
- Many randomized controlled trials are not broadly representative of real-world patients and this may not reflect real-world conditions. Patients who are eligible for inclusion in a randomized controlled trial are usually younger, more likely to be male, healthier and more likely to be treated according to recommendations from guidelines. If and when the intervention is later added to routine-care, a large portion of the patients who will receive it may be old with many concomitant diseases and drug-therapies.

== Types ==
- Case-control study: study originally developed in epidemiology, in which two groups with different outcomes are compared on the basis of some supposed causal attribute.
- Cross-sectional study: involves data collection from a population, or a representative subset, data collected at a single point in time.
- Longitudinal study: correlational research study that involves repeated observations of the same variables over long periods of time. Cohort study and Panel study are particular forms of longitudinal study.
- Target trial emulation: an observational study that tries to emulate a randomized controlled trial.

== Degree of usefulness and reliability ==
"Although observational studies cannot prove cause-and-effect relationships about safety or effectiveness" of a practice, they can:

1. provide information on 'real world' use and practice;
2. detect signals about the benefits and risks of...[the] use [of practices] in the general population;
3. help formulate hypotheses to be tested in subsequent experiments;
4. provide part of the community-level data needed to design more informative pragmatic clinical trials; and
5. inform clinical practice."

== Bias and compensating methods ==
In all of those cases, if a randomized experiment cannot be carried out, the alternative line of investigation suffers from the problem that the decision of which subjects receive the treatment is not entirely random and thus is a potential source of bias. A major challenge in conducting observational studies is to draw inferences that are acceptably free from influences by overt biases, as well as to assess the influence of potential hidden biases. The following are a non-exhaustive set of problems especially common in observational studies.

=== Matching techniques bias ===
In lieu of experimental control, multivariate statistical techniques allow the approximation of experimental control with statistical control by using matching methods. Matching methods account for the influences of observed factors that might influence a cause-and-effect relationship. In healthcare and the social sciences, investigators may use matching to compare units that nonrandomly received the treatment and control. One common approach is to use propensity score matching in order to reduce confounding, although this has recently come under criticism for exacerbating the very problems it seeks to solve.

=== Multiple comparison bias ===
Multiple comparison bias can occur when several hypotheses are tested at the same time. As the number of recorded factors increases, the likelihood increases that at least one of the recorded factors will be highly correlated with the data output simply by chance.

=== Omitted variable bias ===
An observer of an uncontrolled experiment (or process) records potential factors and the data output: the goal is to determine the effects of the factors. Sometimes the recorded factors may not be directly causing the differences in the output. There may be more important factors which were not recorded but are, in fact, causal. Also, recorded or unrecorded factors may be correlated which may yield incorrect conclusions.

=== Selection bias ===
Another difficulty with observational studies is that researchers may themselves be biased in their observational skills. This would allow for researchers to (either consciously or unconsciously) seek out the information they're looking for while conducting their research. For example, researchers may exaggerate the effect of one variable, or downplay the effect of another: researchers may even select in subjects that fit their conclusions. This selection bias can happen at any stage of the research process. This introduces bias into the data where certain variables are systematically incorrectly measured.

== Quality ==
A 2014 (updated in 2024) Cochrane review concluded that observational studies produce results similar to those conducted as randomized controlled trials. The review reported little evidence for significant effect differences between observational studies and randomized controlled trials, regardless of design. Differences need to be evaluated by looking at population, comparator, heterogeneity, and outcomes.

== See also ==
- Observational interpretation fallacy
- Correlation does not imply causation
- Observation
- Difference-in-differences
- Randomized controlled trial (RCT)
- Blinded experiment
- Scientific method
