= Humbert =

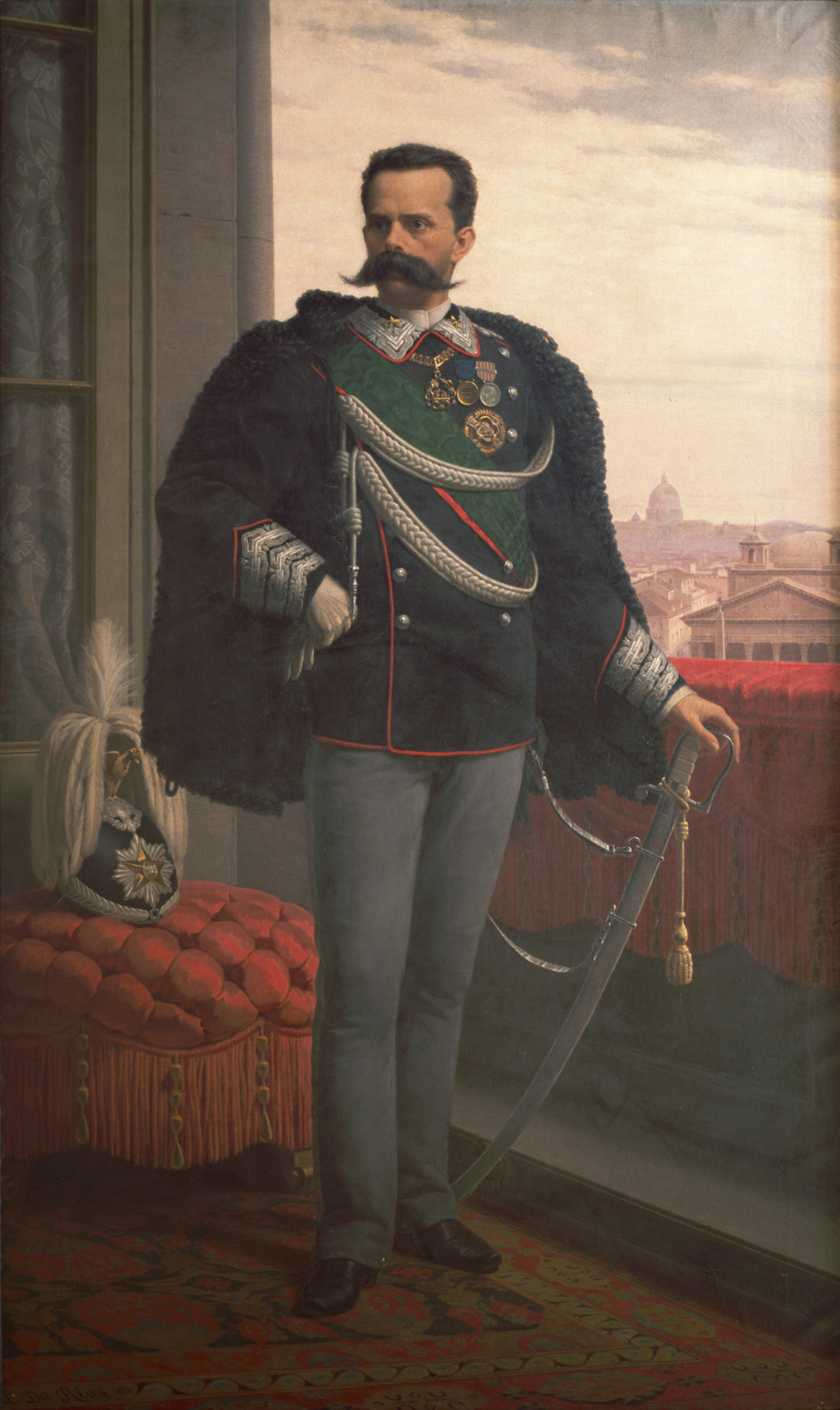
- Humbert I of Italy
- Pronunciation: /ˈhʌmbərt/
- Gender: Male

Origin
- Meaning: "warrior-bright"
- Region of origin: Germanic countries

Other names
- Related names: Umberto

Humbert, Umbert or Humberto (Latinized Humbertus) is a Germanic given name, from hun "warrior" and beraht "bright". It also came into use as a surname.

== Given name ==
Royalty and Middle Ages

- Emebert (died 710)
- Humbert of Maroilles (before 652 – 680)
- Humbert (bishop of Würzburg) (died 842)
- Humbert I, Count of Savoy (980 – 1047 or 1048)
- Humbert II, Count of Savoy (1065–1103)
- Humbert III, Count of Savoy (1135–1189)
- Humbert, bastard of Savoy (c.1318–1374), soldier
- Humbert V de Beaujeu (1198–1250)
- Humbert I of Viennois (1240–1307), Dauphin of the Viennois
- Humbert II of Viennois (1312–1355), Dauphin of the Viennois
- Humbert I of Italy (1844–1900)
- Humbert II of Italy (1904–1983)
- Humbert of Silva Candida (1015–1061), Roman Catholic cardinal and Benedictine oblate
- Humbert of Romans (died 1277), master general of the Dominicans

Others

- Humbert Achamer-Pifrader, Austrian jurist, member of the SS of Nazi Germany and commander of Einsatzgruppe A, one of the major perpetrators of the Holocaust
- Marshal Humberto de Alencar Castelo Branco, Brazilian military leader and politician, President of Brazil and the first President of the Brazilian military dictatorship
- Humberto Delgado, General of the Portuguese Air Force, diplomat and politician
- Humberto Ortega, Nicaraguan military leader and published writer, Minister of Defense of Nicaragua, one of the principal commanders of Sandinista revolution
- Humbert Roque Versace, United States Army officer

== Surname ==
- Agnès Humbert (1894–1963), French art historian and member of the French Resistance during World War II, daughter of Charles Humbert
- Albert Jenkins Humbert (1822–1877), British architect
- Charles Humbert (1866–1927), French politician and newspaper proprietor, father of Agnès Humbert
- Christophe Humbert (born 1979), French judoka
- Gustav Humbert (born 1950), German CEO
- Jean-Henri Humbert (1887–1967), French botanist
- Jean Humbert (painter) (1734–1749), Dutch painter
- Jean Emile Humbert (1771–1839), Dutch military engineer who rediscovered ancient Carthage
- Jean Joseph Amable Humbert (1755–1823), French general
- Mady Humbert-Lavergne (née Humbert) (1898–1987), French ethnomusicologist and composer
- Manon Humbert (born 1989), French curler
- Marie Humbert, Ghanaian actress
- Marie Georges Humbert (1859–1921), mathematician
  - Humbert surface
- Pierre Humbert (architect) (1848–1919)
- Pierre Humbert (mathematician) (1891–1953), for whom are named:
  - Humbert polynomials
  - Humbert series
- Nicole Humbert (née Rieger) (born 1972), German pole vaulter
- Thérèse Humbert (1856–1918), French female fraudster
- Ugo Humbert (born 1998), French tennis player

== Companies ==
- Humbert Aviation, a French aircraft manufacturer

== Fictional characters ==
- Humbert Humbert, narrator of the novel Lolita
- Baron Humbert von Gikkingen, an animated cat creation from Whisper of the Heart (film) and The Cat Returns
- Puff Puff Humbert, frontman of the virtual band Your Favorite Martian.
- Graham Humbert, character Once Upon a Time (TV Series)

== See also ==
- Humbert, Pas-de-Calais, a commune in the Pas-de-Calais département in France
- Humberht (disambiguation)
- Umberto, an Italian masculine given name
- Humberto, a Portuguese and Spanish masculine given name
