= Umberto =

Umberto is a masculine Italian given name. It is the Italian form of Humbert. People with the name include:

- King Umberto I of Italy (1844–1900)
- King Umberto II of Italy (1904–1983)
- Prince Umberto, Count of Salemi (1889–1918)
- Umberto I, Count of Savoy (980 – 1047 or 1048)
- Umberto II, Count of Savoy (1065–1103)
- Umberto III, Count of Savoy (1135–1189)
- Umberto Anastasia, Italian-American mobster
- Umberto Bassignani (1878–1944), Italian sculptor
- Umberto Boccioni (1882–1916), Italian artist and sculptor
- Umberto Calvello (1897–1919), Italian naval aviator
- Umberto Calzolari (1938–2018), Italian baseball player
- Umberto Cassuto (1883–1951), Italian historian and rabbi
- Umberto Chiacchio (1930–2001), Italian politician and entrepreneur
- Umberto Colombo (1927–2006), Italian scientist
- Umberto De Morpurgo (1896–1961), Italian tennis player
- Umberto Eco (1932–2016), Italian writer
- Umberto Giordano (1867–1948), Italian composer
- Umberto Meoli (1920–2002), Italian economic historian
- Umberto Merlin (1885–1964), Italian lawyer and politician
- Umberto Nobile (1885–1978), Italian pilot and explorer
- Umberto Panerai (born 1953), Italian water polo player
- Umberto Pinardi (1928–2025), Italian football player and coach
- Umberto Ricci (1879–1946), Italian academic and economist
- Umberto Tozzi (born 1952), Italian singer and musician

== See also ==
- Umberto D., a 1952 Italian film directed by Vittorio De Sica
- Humbert
- Umbertina, a 1979 novel by Helen Barolini
