= Chiacchio =

Chiacchio is a surname. Notable people with the surname include:

== People ==
- Martina Chiacchio (born 2000), Italian weightlifter
- Matias Chiacchio (born 1988), Argentine footballer
- Umberto Chiacchio (1930–2001), Italian politician

== See also ==
- Darren Chiacchia, (born 1964), American equestrian
- Kenneth Chiacchia, (born 1961), American writer
