= Pincherle =

Pincherle is a surname. Notable people with the surname include:

- Salvatore Pincherle (1853–1936), Italian mathematician
  - Pincherle derivative, in mathematics
- Marc Pincherle (1888–1974), French musicologist, music critic
- Alberto Pincherle (1907–1990), Italian novelist, better known by his pen name Alberto Moravia
