= Humberht =

Humberht (also Humbearht, Hunbearht, Humberrht, Humbreht, Humbrhth, Hunbercht, Hunberht, Hunberhtus, Humberhtus, Hunbrht or Hunberght) is an Anglo-Saxon name that may refer to:

- Hunberght (died c. 830), bishop of Lichfield
- Humberht of the Tomsaete (fl. 835–866), Mercian nobleman
- Hunbeorht (died 870) a.k.a. Humbertus, bishop of Elmham

== See also ==
- Humbert, Germanic given name and surname
