= Tony Lancaster =

American economist (1938–2022)

Anthony Lancaster
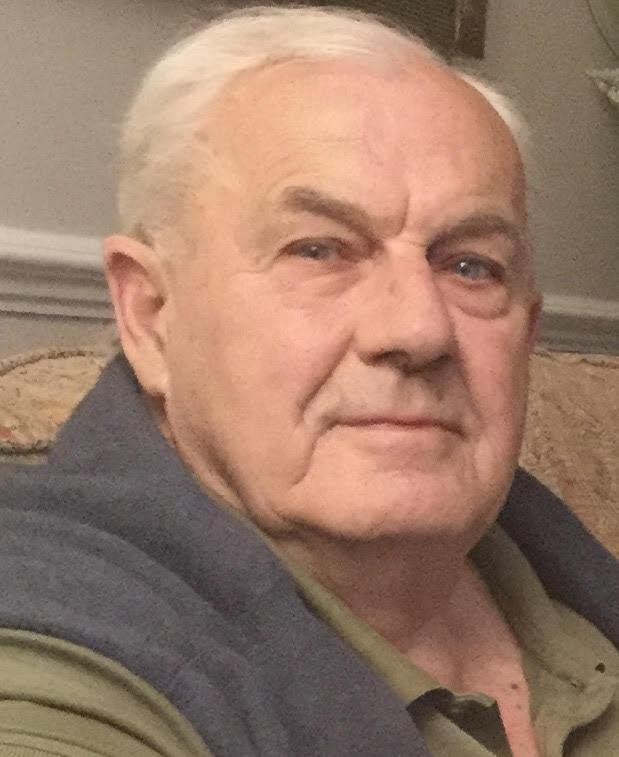
- Born: June 25, 1938; Eccles, Manchester, England
- Died: December 10, 2022 (aged 84); Providence, Rhode Island, U.S.

Academic background
- Education: University of Liverpool (B.A.); St Catharine's College, Cambridge (Ph.D.)
- Doctoral advisor: Michael James Farrell

Academic work
- Discipline: Bayesian econometrics
- Institutions: Brown University; Cemmap
- Doctoral students: Guido Imbens

Anthony Lancaster (June 25, 1938 – December 10, 2022) was a British-American Bayesian econometrician. He was the Herbert H. Goldberger Professor Emeritus at Brown University and a fellow of the Econometric Society from 1991 until his death.

== Early life and education ==
Lancaster was born in Eccles, Manchester, on June 25, 1938. He failed his eleven-plus, but passed at a second attempt and spent the next four years at the bottom of the C stream at King George V Grammar School, Southport. He gained a first class honours in economics from the University of Liverpool in 1959. He was awarded a State Studentship and moved to St Catharine's College, Cambridge, where he earned a doctorate in economics under M.J. Farrell.

== Career ==
In 1963–64 Lancaster finished his PhD dissertation as a research fellow at the Economic and Social Research Institute, Dublin, and in 1964 he was hired at the University of Birmingham. In 1973 he moved to Hull University as a professor and became department chair. In 1986 he was hired by Brown University in Providence, Rhode Island, USA. He served as department chair at Brown and retired in 2006. While at Brown he worked in health economics and was a member of the Department of Community Health in addition to the Economics department. Among the students whose graduate work he supervised were Nobel laureate Guido Imbens, Wilbert Van der Klaauw, Orna Intrator, Tieman Woutersen and Peter Hansen.

Lancaster was an international fellow at the Centre for Microdata Methods and Practice at University College London.

== Personal life and death ==
Lancaster married Jane Heawood in 1967; the couple had two sons, and a daughter from a first marriage.

Lancaster died in Providence, Rhode Island, on December 10, 2022, at the age of 84.

== Publications ==
- Lancaster, Anthony (2004). An Introduction to Modern Bayesian Econometrics (PDF). Blackwells.
- Lancaster, Anthony (2002). "T Orthogonal Parameters and Panel Data". Review of Economic Studies. 69 (3): 647–666. doi:10.1111/1467-937X.t01-1-00025.
- Lancaster, Anthony (1990). The Econometric Analysis of Transition Data: An Econometric Society Monograph. Cambridge University Press.
- Lancaster, Anthony; Imbens, Guido (1995). "Optimal Stock/Flow Panels". Journal of Econometrics. 66 (1–2): 325–348. doi:10.1016/0304-4076(94)01620-F.
- Lancaster, Anthony; Imbens, Guido (1994). "Combining Micro and Macro Data in Microeconometric Model". Review of Economic Studies.
- Lancaster, Anthony (1997). "Bayes WESML: Posterior Inference from Choice-Based Samples". Journal of Econometrics. 79 (2): 297–303. doi:10.1016/S0304-4076(96)00024-3.
- Lancaster, Anthony; Imbens, Guido (1996). "Inference from Contaminated Samples".
- Lancaster, Anthony; Imbens, Guido (1996). "Efficient Estimation and Stratified Sampling". Journal of Econometrics.
- Lancaster, Anthony (April 1997). "Exact Structural Inference in Optimal Job Search Models". Journal of Business Economics and Statistics. 15 (2): 165–179. doi:10.1080/07350015.1997.10524698.
- Lancaster, Anthony; Intrator, Orna (March 1998). "Panel Data with Survival: Hospitalization of HIV Patients". Journal of the American Statistical Association. doi:10.1080/01621459.1998.10474086.
