= Guido Imbens =

Dutch-American econometrician

- Imbens in 2025
- Born: Guido Wilhelmus Imbens; 3 September 1963 (age 63); Geldrop, Netherlands
- Spouse: Susan Athey

Academic background
- Education: Erasmus University (BA); University of Hull (MSc); Brown University (MA, PhD)
- Thesis: Two essays in econometrics (1991)
- Doctoral advisor: Anthony Lancaster

Academic work
- Discipline: Econometrics
- Institutions: Stanford University
- Doctoral students: Rajeev Dehejia; Alfred Galichon
- Awards: Nobel Memorial Prize in Economic Sciences (2021)
- Website: Information at IDEAS / RePEc

Guido Wilhelmus Imbens (born 3 September 1963) is a Dutch-American economist whose research concerns econometrics and statistics. He holds the Applied Econometrics Professorship in Economics (Emeritus) at the Stanford Graduate School of Business at Stanford University, where he has taught since 2012.

In 2021, Imbens was awarded half of the Nobel Memorial Prize in Economic Sciences jointly with Joshua Angrist "for their methodological contributions to the analysis of causal relationships." Their work focused on natural experiments, which can offer empirical data in contexts where controlled experimentation may be expensive, time-consuming, or unethical. In 1994 Imbens and Angrist introduced the local average treatment effect (LATE) framework, an influential mathematical methodology for reliably inferring causation from natural experiments that accounted for and defined the limitations of such inferences. Imbens' work with Angrist, together with the work of Alan Krueger and co-recipient of the prize David Card is credited with catalysing the "credibility revolution" in empirical microeconomics.

== Early life and education ==
Guido Wilhelmus Imbens was born on 3 September 1963 in Geldrop, the Netherlands. As a child, Imbens was an avid chess player. In a 2021 interview, Imbens connected his passion for econometrics to his childhood interest in the game.

In high school Imbens was introduced to the work of Dutch economist Jan Tinbergen. Influenced by Tinbergen's work, Imbens chose to study econometrics at Erasmus University Rotterdam, where Tinbergen had taught and established a program in econometrics. Imbens graduated with a Candidate's degree in Econometrics from Erasmus University Rotterdam in 1983. He subsequently obtained an M.Sc. degree with distinction in Economics and Econometrics from the University of Hull in Kingston upon Hull, UK in 1986.

In 1986, one of Imbens' mentors at the University of Hull, Anthony Lancaster, moved to Brown University in Providence, Rhode Island. Imbens followed Lancaster to Brown to pursue further graduate and doctoral studies. Imbens received an A.M. and a Ph.D. degree in economics from Brown in 1989 and 1991, respectively.

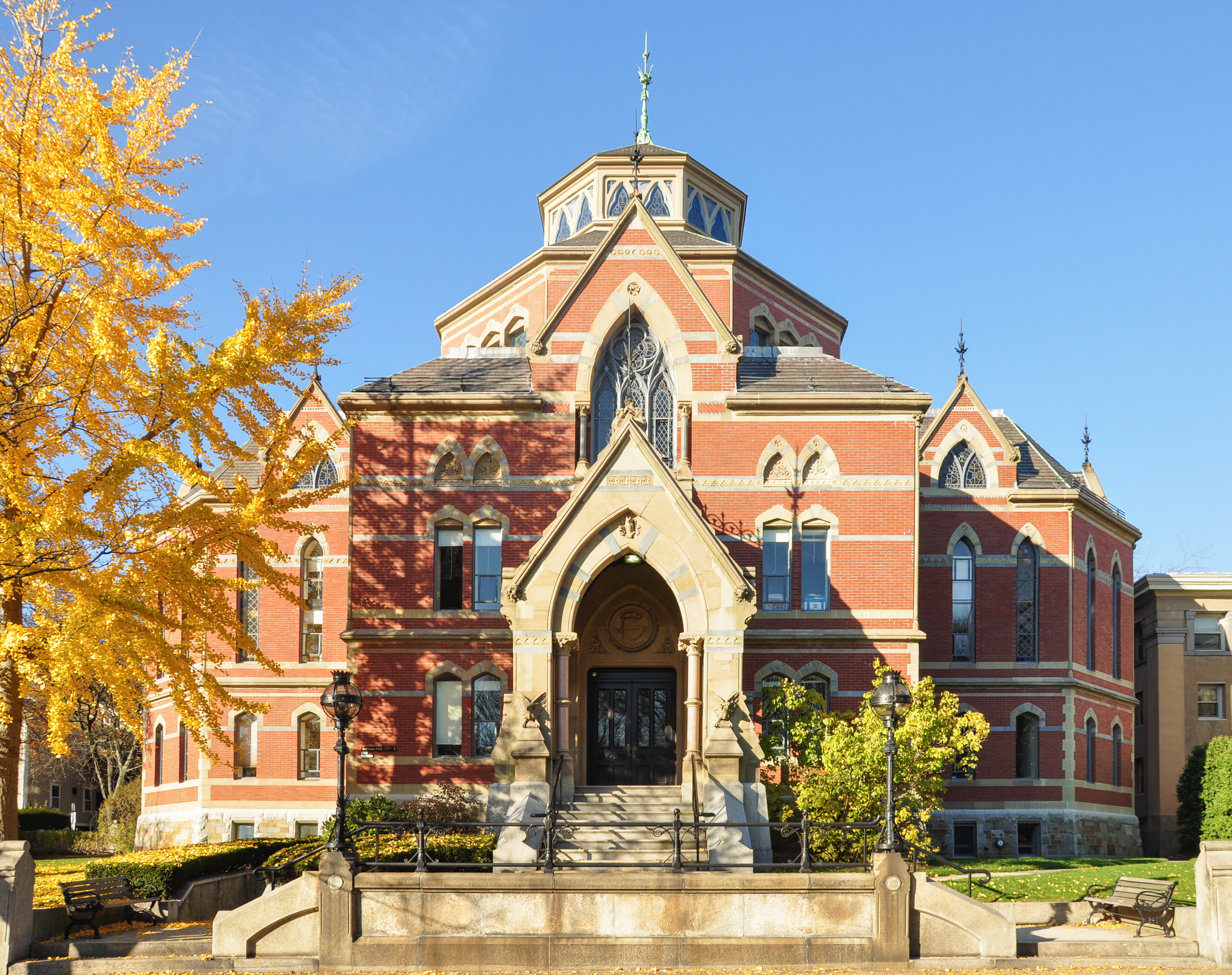
The Department of Economics at Brown University

== Career ==
Imbens has taught at Tilburg University (1989–1990), Harvard University (1990–97, 2007–12), the University of California, Los Angeles (1997–2001), and the University of California, Berkeley (2001–07). He specializes in econometrics, which are particular methods for drawing causal inference. He became the editor of Econometrica in 2019, with his term anticipated (as of 2022) to end in 2025. As of 2026, he is the Applied Econometrics Professor Emeritus at Stanford Graduate School of Business. He is also a senior fellow at the Stanford Institute for Economic Policy Research (SIEPR) and a professor of economics at the institute's School of Humanities and Sciences.

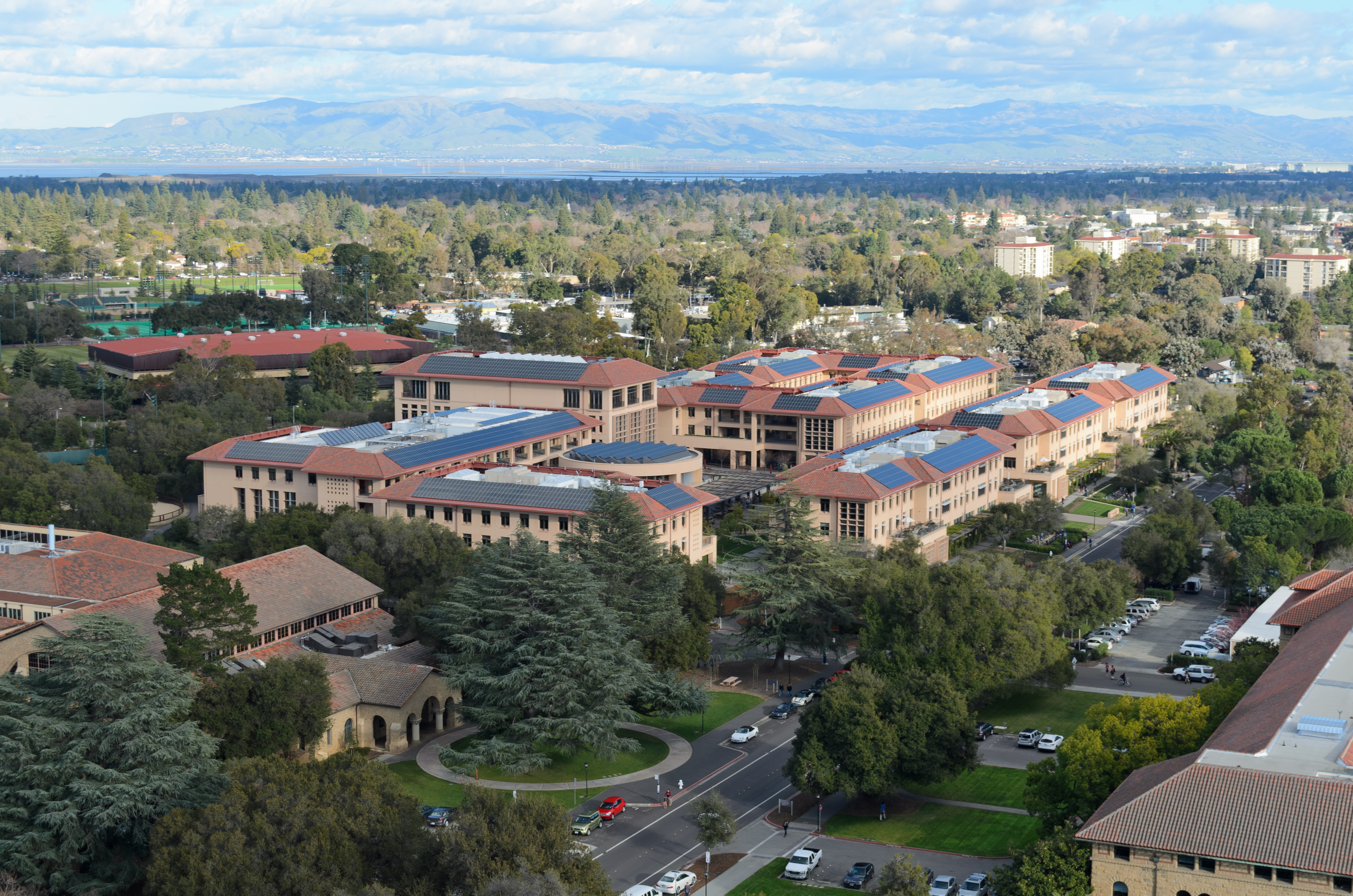
The Stanford Graduate School of Business, where Imbens has taught since 2012

Imbens is a fellow of the Econometric Society (2001) and the American Academy of Arts and Sciences (2009). Imbens was elected to the Royal Netherlands Academy of Arts and Sciences as a foreign member in 2017. He was elected as a Fellow of the American Statistical Association in 2020.

=== Econometrics and work on causal relationships ===
Working with fellow economists including Joshua Angrist and Alan Krueger, Imbens focused on developing methodologies and frameworks that help economists use a kind of real-life situations known as natural experiments to test hypotheses about causal relationships, such as the impact of additional years of school education on earnings. His frameworks for causal relationships study found use in multiple other fields including social and biomedical sciences. It provided researchers with tools to understand the limitations of real-world experiments, improving their ability to better understand the effects of field and experimental data based interventions.

In one of his earliest collaborations with Angrist, Imbens introduced a concept called Local Average Treatment Effect (LATE) to draw causal inference from observational data. In a 1994 Econometrica paper titled "Identification and Estimation of Local Average Treatment Effects", the pair employed the idea of natural experiments, where one studies the effects of key changes by using chance and randomization that naturally occur in the real world, instead of controlled conditions, which can be expensive, time-consuming, or even unethical. The paper and the concept had significant impact on other research efforts across econometrics, statistics and other fields.

In a 2001 paper, Imbens partnered with statistician Donald Rubin and economist Bruce Sacerdote to study the impact of unearned earnings on labor supply, i.e. the implications of policy interventions such as Universal Basic Income or other federal and state wage assistance programs on citizens' willingness to participate in the labor force and the eventual impact on labor supply. To devise a natural experiment, the group studied the winners of the Massachusetts state lottery where the winners were paid incrementally over many years as opposed to a lump-sum payment. In doing so, the group was able to study the causal effects of guaranteed income. They found that winning the lottery had only a small impact on how much people worked. Winners of $80,000 a year for 20 years reduced their working hours somewhat, but winners of $15,000 a year for 20 years did not. Among unemployed persons who played the lottery, winners worked more than non-winners in the six years after playing.

Some of Imbens' work was summarized in a 2015 book co-written with American statistician Donald B. Rubin, Causal Inference for Statistics, Social, and Biomedical Sciences.

Around 2016, he (along with his wife Susan Athey) worked on using machine learning methods, particularly modifications to random forests called causal forests, to estimate heterogeneous treatment effects in causal inference models.

=== Nobel Memorial Prize in Economics ===
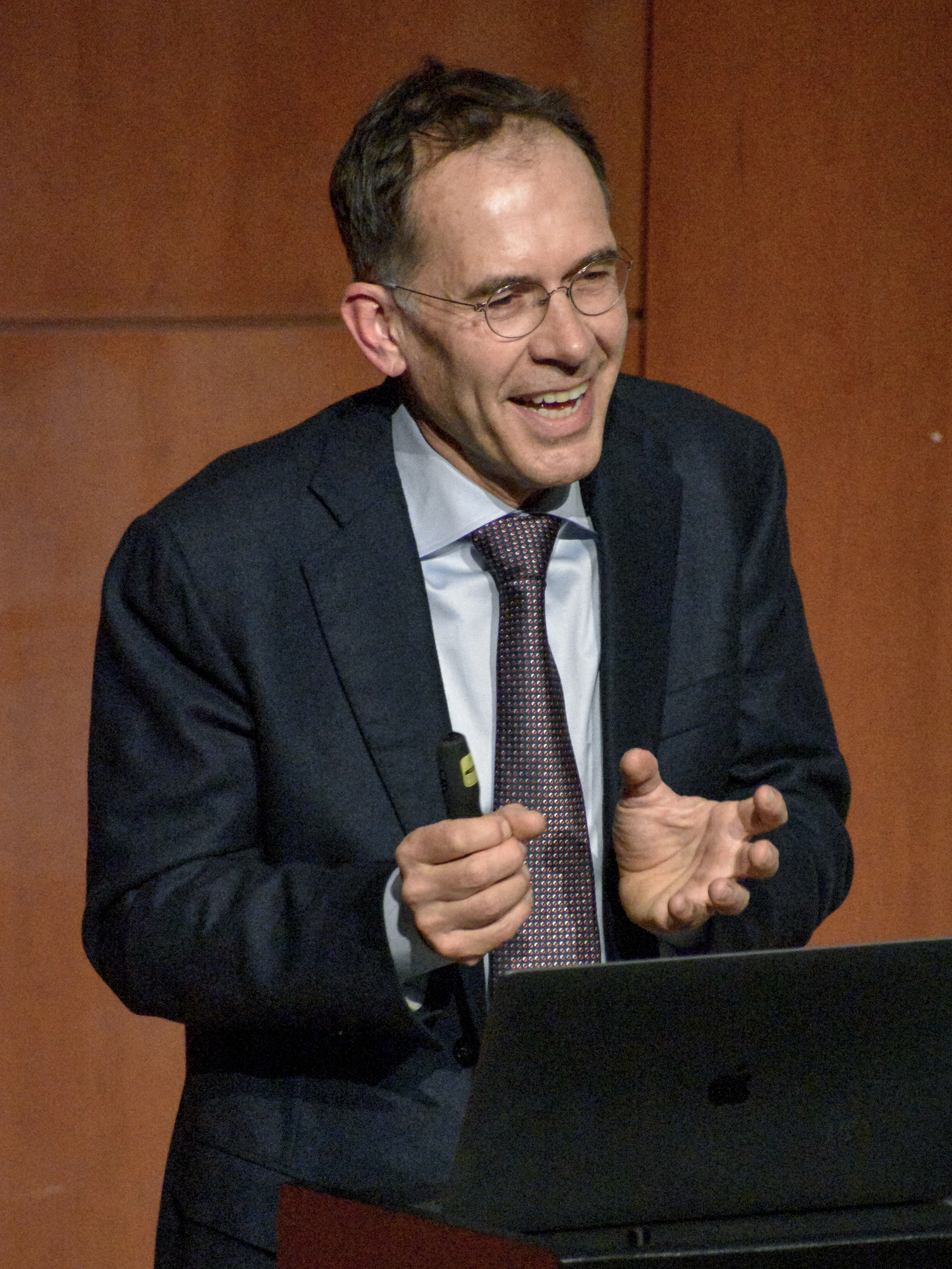
Imbens speaking at Brown University in March 2022

Imbens received the 2021 Nobel Memorial Prize in Economic Sciences along with fellow economists David Card and Joshua Angrist for their contributions toward methodologies for the analysis of causal relationships. In its press release, the Royal Swedish Academy of Sciences stated that they "have provided us with new insights about the labour market and shown what conclusions about cause and effect can be drawn from natural experiments. Their approach has spread to other fields and revolutionised empirical research."

== Personal life ==
Imbens has been married to fellow economist Susan Athey since 2002. Athey likewise teaches at the Stanford Graduate School of Business where she holds the Economics of Technology Professorship. The best man at Imbens and Athey's wedding was Joshua Angrist, with whom Imbens would share the Nobel prize 19 years later.

He holds dual citizenship in the United States and the Netherlands.

== Honors and awards ==
- Honorary Doctorate, University of St. Gallen, 2014
- Horace Mann Medal, Brown University Graduate School, 2017
- Nobel Memorial Prize in Economic Sciences, 2021
- Doctorate of Humane Letters, Brown University, 2022
- Great Immigrants Award, Carnegie Corporation of New York
- Honorary Doctorate, Erasmus University Rotterdam, 2023

== Bibliography ==
- (with Lisa M. Lynch) Re-employment probabilities over the business cycle. Cambridge, MA: National Bureau of Economic Research, 1993.
- (with Richard H. Spady and Phillip M. Johnson) Information Theoretic Approaches to Inference in Moment Condition Models. Cambridge, Mass.: National Bureau of Economic Research, 1995.
- (with Gary Chamberlain) Nonparametric applications of Bayesian inference. Cambridge, MA: National Bureau of Economic Research, 1996.
- (with Donald B. Rubin and Bruce Sacerdote) Estimating the effect of unearned income on labor supply, earnings, savings, and consumption : evidence from a survey of lottery players. Cambridge, MA: National Bureau of Economic Research, 1999.
- (with V. Joseph Hotz and Jacob Alex Klerman) The long-term gains from GAIN : a re-analysis of the impacts of the California GAIN Program. Cambridge, MA: National Bureau of Economic Research, 2000.
- (with Thomas Lemieux) Regression discontinuity designs: a guide to practice. Cambridge, Mass. : National Bureau of Economic Research, 2007.
- (with Jeffrey M. Wooldridge) Recent Developments in the Econometrics of Program Evaluation. Cambridge, Mass. : National Bureau of Economic Research, 2008.
- (with Karthik Kalyanaraman) Optimal bandwidth choice for the regression discontinuity estimator. Cambridge, Mass.: National Bureau of Economic Research, 2009.
- (with Alberto Abadie) A martingale representation for matching estimators. Cambridge, Mass.: National Bureau of Economic Research, 2009.
- Imbens, Guido W.; Rubin, Donald B. (6 April 2015). Causal Inference for Statistics, Social, and Biomedical Sciences: An Introduction. Cambridge University Press. ISBN 9780521885881.
