= M. J. Farrell =

M. J. Farrell may refer to:

- Michael James Farrell (1926–1975), British economist
- Molly Keane (1904–1996), Irish novelist and playwright, who also wrote as M. J. Farrell
