= Galichon =

Galichon is a French surname. Notable people with the surname include:

- Alfred Galichon (born 1977), French economist and mathematician
- Rich Galichon (born 1968), American drummer
