= Feyrer =

Feyrer is a surname. Notable people with the surname include:

- James Feyrer (born 1968), American economist
- Julia Feyrer (born 1982), Canadian artist, performer, and writer
- Sebastian Feyrer (born 1997), Austrian footballer

== See also ==
- Ferrer (surname)
