= Circle group =

Lie group of complex numbers of unit modulus; topologically a circle

Multiplication on the circle group is equivalent to addition of angles.

In mathematics, the circle group, denoted by $\mathbb T$ or $S^1$, is the multiplicative group of all complex numbers with absolute value 1, that is, the unit circle in the complex plane or simply the unit complex numbers

$$\mathbb T = \{ z \in \C : |z| = 1 \}.$$

The circle group plays a fundamental role in many areas of mathematics.

When a given unit complex number $u$ multiplies the other points of the circle, the effect is to rotate them through an angle determined by $u$. In this way, the circle group becomes the group of symmetries of the circle which preserve its orientation (do not flip it). Composition of two rotations is the ordinary multiplication of complex numbers. Multiplication is commutative, $z_1z_2 = z_2z_1$, making the circle group commutative (an abelian group); correspondingly several rotations of the plane can be composed in any order with the same result. Rotations can alternately be parametrized by the angle measure $\theta$, which is related to $z$ by the complex exponential function:
$$\theta \mapsto z = e^{i\theta} = \cos\theta + i\sin\theta.$$

The circle group is sometimes denoted by $U(1)$, which is the unitary group of $1\times 1$ complex matrices. It is structurally the same as (i.e., isomorphic to) the group of 2-dimensional rotation matrices, i.e., the special orthogonal group $\mathrm{SO}(2)$. The angle measure gives a periodic parameterization of the circle group, so the group is often treated as a periodic interval $[0,2\pi]$ with the endpoints glued together, and the group operation as addition modulo $2\pi$: the usual addition of angles. The notation $\mathbb T$ for the circle group stems from the fact that a circle is a 1-dimensional torus. More generally, $\mathbb T^n$ (the direct product of $\mathbb T$ with itself $n$ times) is geometrically an $n$-torus. The notation $S^1$ stands for 1-dimensional sphere.

The circle group has applications throughout mathematics, especially in advanced mathematics. It is the group underlying classical Fourier series. It is dual to the additive group of the integers. It also has applications throughout topology and mathematical physics. It is the group underlying electromagnetism. Electromagnetic theory can be formulated as a theory of bundles associated to the circle group, which are primary objects of study in homotopy theory and algebraic topology.

== Elementary introduction ==
Elements of the circle group can be thought of as representing rotations of the Euclidean plane about a particular point, those geometric transformations which keep that point fixed while preserving the distance between arbitrary points as well as the orientation of shapes. The group operation then corresponds to composition of rotations, that is, the combination of two rotations resulting from applying one rotation and then the other.

If a point $p$ with rectangular coordinates $(x_p, y_p)$ in the Euclidean plane is represented by a complex number $z_p = x_p + y_pi$ (see complex plane), then multiplication by a unit complex number $z_R$ results in the complex number $z_R\cdot z_p$ which represents the point $R(p)$, the result of rotating $p$ around the origin $(0, 0)$ by some rotation $R$. Each unit complex number corresponds to a different rotation, and vice versa. So the unit complex number $z_R$ can be used to represent the corresponding rotation $R$. If two different rotations $R_1$ and $R_2$ are represented by the unit complex numbers $z_1$ and $z_2$, then their composition $R_2\circ R_1$ is represented by the product of the complex numbers $z_2 \cdot z_1$.

Another common way of representing a rotation is by an angle measured in degrees or radians, often denoted by the Greek letter $\theta$. Conventionally, a positive angle is considered to represent a counterclockwise rotation. Two angles which differ by $360^\circ$ or $2\pi$ radians represent the same rotation, so it is common to pick the representative angle for the rotation to be between $0^\circ$ and $360^\circ$ (or $[0, 2\pi)$ radians) or, more symmetrically, between $-180^\circ$ and $+180^\circ$ (or $(-\pi, +\pi]$ radians). Two rotations represented by angle measure can be composed simply by adding them together; sometimes the new angle falls outside the designated interval for representative angles – we have looped around the circle – and we can then add or subtract a multiple of $360^\circ$ ($2\pi$ radians) to return to the interval.

A rotation of a point in the complex plane by an angle $\theta$ about the origin (measured in radians) corresponds to multiplication by the complex number $e^{\theta i} = \cos \theta + i\sin \theta$, where $e^z$ is the complex exponential function and $\sin$ and $\cos$ are trigonometric functions). Adding angles corresponds to multiplying unit complex numbers:
$$e^{(\theta_1 + \theta_2) i} = e^{\theta_1 i} e^{\theta_2 i}.$$

In some contexts, instead of using degrees in the interval $[0, 360)$ or radians in the interval $[0, 2\pi)$, angles are represented by fractions of a full turn in the interval $[0, 1)$. This version makes arithmetic convenient because an angle which has fallen outside of the interval can be brought back inside it by taking its fractional part: for a positive number, this amounts to throwing away any digits before the decimal point. For example, to compose a $0.75$ turn rotation and a $0.5$ turn rotation, add the two numbers, $0.75 + 0.5 = 1.25$, and then throw away the leading $1$, resulting in a $0.25$ turn rotation.

The periodic interval $[0, 1)$ can be considered to be the quotient group of the real numbers modulo the integers, symbolically written $\R/\Z$; this is the group of equivalence classes of real numbers, with any two real numbers which differ by an integer considered to be equivalent. Each equivalence class includes one real number in the finite interval $[0, 1)$, which can be used to represent it. As a group under addition, $\R/\Z$ is isomorphic to the circle group $\mathbb T$ of unit complex numbers under multiplication, meaning the two groups are structurally the same.

== Isomorphisms and conventions ==
The circle group shows up in a variety of forms in mathematics. We list some of the more common forms here. Specifically, we show that
$$\mathbb T \cong \mbox{U}(1) \cong \R/\Z \cong \mathrm{SO}(2),$$
where the slash ($~\!/~\!$) denotes group quotient and $\cong$ the existence of an isomorphism between the groups.

=== Unitary group U(1) ===
A $1\times1$ matrix has $1$ row and $1$ column, and only a single entry. The product of two $1\times1$ matrices is the matrix whose single entry is the product of the entries of each of the matrices:
$$\begin{bmatrix}z_1\end{bmatrix} \begin{bmatrix}z_2\end{bmatrix} = \begin{bmatrix}z_1z_2\end{bmatrix}.$$
Therefore any group of $1\times1$ matrices under matrix multiplication can be trivially related to the group of corresponding entries under multiplication. A unitary matrix is a matrix with complex entries for which multiplication by the conjugate transpose results in the identity matrix; for a $1\times1$ matrix, an equivalent condition is that the single entry has unit absolute value, making it an element of the circle group. This makes the circle group canonically isomorphic to the first unitary group $\mathrm{U}(1)$, the group of $1\times1$ unitary matrices under matrix multiplication. That is,
$$\mathbb T \cong \mbox{U}(1).$$

It is routine to conflate a $1\times1$ matrix with its single entry, considering elements of $\mathrm{U}(1)$ to be unit complex numbers directly. The symbol $\mathrm{U}(1)$ can be used as an abbreviation for the multiplicative group of unit complex numbers.

=== Periodic interval under addition ===
The exponential function gives rise to a map $\exp\colon \R \to \mathbb T$ from the additive real numbers $\R$ to the circle group $\mathbb T$, elements of which can be separated into real and imaginary components using Euler's formula,
$$\theta \mapsto e^{i\theta} = \cos\theta + i \sin \theta,$$
where the real number $\theta$ corresponds to an angle (argument) of a unit complex number as measured counterclockwise from the positive real axis. The exponential function converts sums in the domain to products in the image. In particular, for any pair of real numbers $\theta_1$ and $\theta_2$,
$$e^{i(\theta_1+\theta_2)} = e^{i\theta_1} e^{i\theta_2}.$$
This property makes $\exp\colon \R \to \mathbb T$ a group homomorphism. While the map is surjective, it is not injective and therefore not an isomorphism. The kernel of this map (the elements which map to the complex number $1$) is the set of all integer multiples of $2\pi$. By the first isomorphism theorem we then have that
$$\mathbb T \cong \R~\!/~\!2\pi\Z.$$
After rescaling we can also say that $\mathbb T$ is isomorphic to $\R/\Z$.

=== Special orthogonal group SO(2) ===
Rotations of the Euclidean vector plane about the origin are examples of linear transformations, which can be represented as $2\times 2$ matrices with real entries, specifically as rotation matrices (also called special orthogonal matrices), those matrices $Q$ which yield the identity matrix when multiplied by their transpose, $QQ^\mathsf{T} = Q^\mathsf{T} Q = I$, and whose determinant is 1. Such a matrix always takes the form
$$Q = \begin{bmatrix}
x & -y \\
y & \phantom{-}x \\
\end{bmatrix},$$
with $\operatorname{det}(Q) = x^2 + y^2 = 1$. The matrix $Q$ can be uniquely identified with the unit complex number $z = x + iy$. If the matrix represents a rotation by angle $\theta$, then $z = e^{i\theta}$, $x = \cos\theta$, and $y = \sin\theta$, so $Q$ can be written as
$$Q = \begin{bmatrix}
\cos \theta & -\sin \theta \\
\sin \theta & \phantom{-}\cos \theta \\
\end{bmatrix}.$$

The squared modulus of the complex number, $|z|^2 = \bar{z}z = x^2 + y^2$, corresponds to the determinant and the complex conjugate, $\bar{z} = x - iy$, corresponds to the transpose of the matrix. Matrix multiplication of such matrices is consistent with addition of corresponding angles or multiplication of corresponding complex numbers (see Angle sum identities).
$$\begin{align}
&\begin{bmatrix}
\cos \theta_1 & -\sin\theta_1 \\
\sin \theta_1 & \phantom{-}\cos\theta_1
\end{bmatrix}
\begin{bmatrix}
\cos \theta_2 & -\sin\theta_2 \\
\sin \theta_2 & \phantom{-}\cos\theta_2
\end{bmatrix}
\\[3pt]
&\quad= \begin{bmatrix}
\cos\theta_1\cos\theta_2 - \sin\theta_1\sin\theta_2 & -\cos\theta_1\sin\theta_2 - \sin\theta_1\cos\theta_2 \\
\cos\theta_1\sin\theta_2 + \sin\theta_1\cos\theta_2 & \phantom{-}\cos\theta_1\cos\theta_2 - \sin\theta_1\sin\theta_2
\end{bmatrix}
\\[3pt]
&\quad= \begin{bmatrix}
\cos(\theta_1 + \theta_2) & -\sin(\theta_1 + \theta_2) \\
\sin(\theta_1 + \theta_2) & \phantom{-}\cos(\theta_1 + \theta_2)
\end{bmatrix}.
\end{align}$$
Therefore the circle group is isomorphic to the special orthogonal group $\mathrm{SO}(2)$, that is,
$$\mathbb T \cong \mathrm{SO}(2).$$
This isomorphism has the geometric interpretation that multiplication by a unit complex number is a proper rotation in the complex (and real) plane, and every such rotation is of this form.

=== Conventions ===
While the symbol $\mathbb T$ and the name "circle group" often refer to the unit complex numbers under multiplication, it is common to give this name and symbol to one of the other isomorphic groups, depending on convenience. The three common definitions of the circle group are:

- $\mathbb T = \{ z\in\C : |z| = 1\}$
- $\mathbb T = \R/\Z$
- $\mathbb T = \R/2\pi\Z$

In the first, the group operation is written multiplicatively, while in the latter two the operation is written additively.

== Topological, measurable, and analytic structure ==
The circle group is more than just an abstract algebraic object. It has a natural topology when regarded as a subspace of the complex plane. It is a metric space with (at least) two natural notions of distance between elements: the absolute value of the difference between two unit complex numbers (the length of the chord between points in the complex plane), or the absolute value of the difference between nearest representative angles (the arc length of the shortest arc between points on the complex unit circle). The open balls are circular arcs. Since multiplication and inversion are continuous functions on $\C^\times$, the circle group has the structure of a topological group. Moreover, since the unit circle is a closed subset of the complex plane, the circle group is a closed subgroup of $\C^\times$ (itself regarded as a topological group). It is compact, connected, but not simply connected. Its fundamental group is the additive group of integers, with each integer corresponding to the number of times a closed path loops around the circle.

=== Integration and Haar measure ===
Integration in the circle group can be defined in a canonical invariant way. For a continuous function $f$, the integral takes the form:

- For the convention $\mathbb T=U(1)$,

$$\int_{U(1)} f(z) d\mu(z) = \frac1{2\pi}\int_0^{2\pi}f(e^{i\theta})\,d\theta.$$

- For the convention $\mathbb T=\mathbb R/2\pi\mathbb Z$,

$$\int_{\mathbb R/2\pi\mathbb Z} f(\theta) d\mu(\theta) = \frac1{2\pi}\int_0^{2\pi}f(\theta)\,d\theta.$$

- For the convention $\mathbb T=\mathbb R/\mathbb Z$,

$$\int_{\mathbb R/\mathbb Z} f(x) d\mu(x) = \int_0^1f(x)\,dx.$$
Here, $d\theta$ and $dx$ refer to the usual Lebesgue measure on the real line. In each case, this is a probability measure, meaning that the integral of the constant function $1$ over the whole group is equal to 1. This integral is not arbitrary, but is the unique (Borel) probability measure that is invariant under constant change of variables $z\to e^{iC}z$ for $U(1)$ (or $\theta\to\theta + C$ for $\mathbb R/\mathbb Z$ or $\mathbb R/2\pi\mathbb Z$). The asserted uniqueness is a special case of Haar's theorem, and the measure is known as the (normalized) Haar measure.

=== Invariant metrics ===
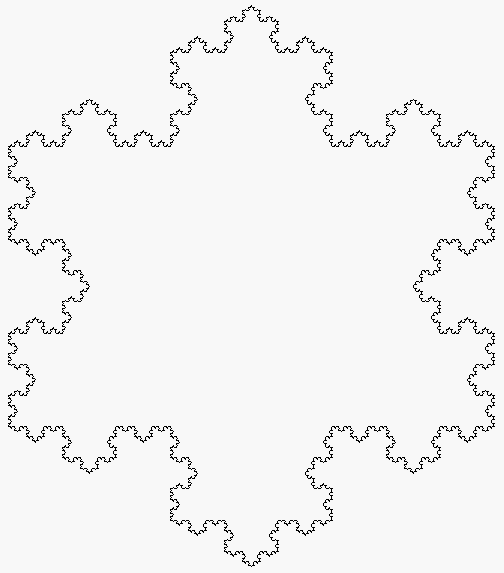
Lipschitz embedding of a snowflake metric on the circle group into the Euclidean plane, the Koch snowflake

The chordal and length metrics already defined give a pair of invariant metrics on the circle group. They are invariant in the sense that the distance between two points is unchanged if the points are rotated through the same angle. These metrics are equivalent, in the sense that there is a positive constant $C$ with
$$\frac{1}{C}d_{\text{chord}}(x,y)\le d_{\text{length}}(x,y) \le C d_{\text{chord}}(x,y)$$
for every pair of points $x,y\in\mathbb T$. The arclength metric is the only invariant Riemannian metric on the circle, and in fact the only invariant length metric, up to a constant normalization.

Other invariant distance functions defining an invariant metric space structure on the circle group can also be defined. In general, an invariant metric is determined by specifying the distance from a point $1$ to each point $x\in\mathbb T$, $\lambda(x) = d(1,x)$. If $\lambda:\mathbb T\to[0,\infty)$ is continuous, satisfies $\lambda(1)=0$, $\lambda(x)>0$ for $x\ne1$, $\lambda(x)=\lambda(x^{-1})$, and $\lambda(xy)\leq\lambda(x)+\lambda(y)$, then $d(x,y)=\lambda(x^{-1}y)$ defines a compatible invariant metric on $\mathbb T$.

An example is $d(x,y) = d_{\text{chord}}(x,y)^\alpha$ where $0 < \alpha \le 1$, called a snowflake metric. It is not equivalent to the chord (or length) metric unless $\alpha=1$. With this metric, the Hausdorff dimension of $\mathbb T$ is $1/\alpha$, and so gives the group the structure of a fractal curve. The snowflake interpolates between the usual chordal metric $\alpha=1$, which is one-dimensional, and metrics that have unbounded Hausdorff dimension. The snowflake metric with $\alpha=\log(3)/\log(4)$ can be embedded in the plane into the Koch snowflake plane curve, whose chordal metric is equivalent.

Other invariant metrics on the circle are used in areas of data analysis and machine learning, and exhibit similar metric-measure properties as the snowflake metrics. One family derives from the study of diffusion on the circle, or equivalently is given by the Sobolev distance between Dirac delta functions on the circle group:
$$d_s(x,y)^2 = \|\delta_x-\delta_y\|_{H^{-s}}^2 = \sum_{n\in\mathbb Z\setminus\{0\}} |n|^{-2s}|x^n-y^n|^2,\quad s > 1/2.$$

=== Manifold and Lie group structure ===
The circle is a 1-dimensional real manifold, and multiplication and inversion are real-analytic maps on the circle. This gives the circle group the structure of a one-parameter group, an instance of a Lie group. In fact, up to isomorphism, it is the unique 1-dimensional compact, connected Lie group. Moreover, every $n$-dimensional compact, connected, abelian Lie group is isomorphic to $\mathbb T^n$.

Every compact Lie group $\mathrm{G}$ of positive dimension contains a non-trivial maximal torus as a subgroup, and therefore a subgroup isomorphic to the circle group. This means that, thinking in terms of symmetry, a compact symmetry group acting continuously can be expected to have one-parameter circle subgroups acting; the consequences in physical systems are seen, for example, at rotational invariance and spontaneous symmetry breaking.

== Subgroups ==
The circle group has many subgroups, but its only proper closed subgroups consist of roots of unity: For each integer $n > 0$, there are $n$ distinct $n$th roots of unity, which form a cyclic group of order $n$, which is the unique subgroup of that order.

All other subgroups of the circle group have infinitely many elements and are dense. Some examples are:

- The set of all roots of unity. This is the group $\{e^{2\pi i q}\mid q\in\mathbb Q\}$, where $\mathbb Q$ is the set of rational numbers. It is dense in the same way that the rational numbers are dense in the reals.
- A different dense subgroup is the group of rational points on the unit circle, that is pairs $(x,y)$ of rational numbers satisfying $x^2+y^2=1$. This is because the rational numbers are mapped to rational points of the circle under stereographic projection, the same parametrization that produces primitive Pythagorean triples.
- When $p$ is a prime number, the subgroup of all roots of unity whose order is a power of $p$ is also dense. Equivalently, under the isomorphism $\mathbb R/\mathbb Z\cong\mathbb T$, this is the subgroup consisting of rationals whose denominator is a power of $p$. This subgroup is called the Prüfer $p$-group.
- For an irrational number $a$ in $\mathbb R/\mathbb Z$, the multiples of $a$, $\{na|n\in\mathbb Z\}$ is a dense subgroup which is discussed further below.

=== Endomorphisms and covering maps ===
The continuous group endomorphisms of the circle group (written multiplicatively) are the power maps
$$z\mapsto z^n,\qquad n\in\mathbb Z.$$
For $n\ne 0$, this map is an $|n|$-fold covering homomorphism whose kernel is the group of $|n|$th roots of unity. In particular, the automorphism group of $\mathbb T$ as a topological group is
$$\operatorname{Aut}(\mathbb T)\cong\{\pm 1\},$$
corresponding to $z\mapsto z$ and $z\mapsto z^{-1}$.

== Representations ==
The finite-dimensional continuous representations of the circle group are easy to describe. It follows from Schur's lemma that the irreducible finite-dimensional continuous complex representations of an abelian compact group are all 1-dimensional. Since the circle group is compact, any continuous representation
$$\rho\colon \mathbb T \to \mathrm{GL}(1, \C) \cong \C^\times$$
must take values in $\mbox{U}(1) \cong \mathbb T$. Therefore, the irreducible finite-dimensional continuous complex representations of the circle group are just the continuous homomorphisms from the circle group to itself.

For each integer $n$ we can define a representation $\phi_n$ of the circle group by $\phi_n(z) = z^n$. These representations are all inequivalent. The representation $\phi_{-n}$ is conjugate to $\phi_{n}$:
$$\phi_{-n} = \overline{\phi_n}.$$

These representations are just the continuous characters of the circle group. The continuous character group of $\mathbb T$, also called its Pontryagin dual, is an infinite cyclic group generated by $\phi_1$:
$$\operatorname{Hom}_{\mathrm{cts}}(\mathbb T, \mathbb T) \cong \Z.$$

The finite-dimensional continuous irreducible real representations of the circle group are the trivial representation (which is 1-dimensional) and the representations
$$\rho_n\bigl(e^{i\theta}\bigr) = \begin{bmatrix}
\cos n\theta & -\sin n\theta \\
\sin n\theta & \cos n\theta
\end{bmatrix}, \quad
n \in \Z^+ ,$$
taking values in $\mathrm{SO}(2)$. Here we only have positive integers $n$, since the representation $\rho_{-n}$ is equivalent to $\rho_n$. After complexification, $\rho_n$ decomposes as the direct sum of the two complex characters $\phi_n$ and $\phi_{-n}$.

The representations of the circle group play a role in constructing the representations of all compact Lie groups. Every compact Lie group has a maximal torus, which is the product of $n$ copies of the circle group. The number $n$ is called the rank of the Lie group. The representations of the torus determine the weight lattice, and, when the group is connected, the representations of the full group can be found by highest weight theory.

== Fourier analysis ==
=== Fourier series ===
The characters of $\mathbb T$ are the fundamental building blocks of Fourier series. The characters form an orthonormal basis for $L^2(\mathbb T)$ with respect to normalized Haar measure. Thus any square-integrable function on $\mathbb T$ has an expansion
$$f=\sum_{n=-\infty}^{\infty} \widehat f(n)e_n$$
with convergence in $L^2$, where
$$\widehat f(n)=\int_{\mathbb T}\overline{e_n(t)}f(t)\,d\mu(t)$$
is its $n$th Fourier coefficient.

In the three common conventions for realizing the circle group, the characters are:

- For $U(1)$, they are $e_n(z)=z^n$.
- For $\mathbb R/2\pi\mathbb Z$, they are $e_n(\theta)=e^{in\theta}$.
- For $\mathbb R/\mathbb Z$, they are $e_n(x)=e^{2\pi i n x}$.

These conventions place the factor $2\pi$ in different parts of the notation. The first is the unit-circle or Laurent convention (and $2\pi$ is the usual arc length of the circle). When the series is regarded as a Laurent series in a complex variable $z$, it is closely related to the bilateral z-transform. The second is the angular frequency convention, using a coordinate of period $2\pi$. The third is the ordinary frequency convention using a coordinate of period $1$, with $2\pi$ appearing in the character.

=== Heat equation and diffusion ===
Diffusion is an invariant process on the circle that governs the statistics of motion of Brownian particles and the flow of heat in a one-dimensional periodic domain. Diffusion is governed by the standard translation-invariant Laplacian, which on $\mathbb T=\mathbb R/\mathbb Z$ is $\Delta=d^2/dx^2$, and the heat equation is
$$\frac{\partial u}{\partial t} = \frac{\partial^2u}{\partial x^2}.$$
This equation can be solved for initial data the character $e^{2\pi i n x}$, giving the diagonal evolution
$$e^{t\Delta}e^{2\pi i n x}=e^{-4\pi^2n^2t}e^{2\pi i n x}.$$
Thus the heat kernel on the circle is the Fourier series
$$p_t(x)=\sum_{n\in\mathbb Z}e^{-4\pi^2n^2t}e^{2\pi i n x}
=1+2\sum_{n=1}^{\infty}e^{-4\pi^2n^2t}\cos(2\pi n x).$$
Equivalently, by Poisson summation,
$$p_t(x)=\frac{1}{\sqrt{4\pi t}}\sum_{k\in\mathbb Z}
\exp\!\left(-\frac{(x+k)^2}{4t}\right).$$
This is a periodized Gaussian and may be expressed in terms of a Jacobi theta function. The solution of the heat equation with initial data $f$ is convolution with this kernel, $u(t,x)=(p_t*f)(x)$.

An analogous method, essentially replacing $t$ by $it$, can be used to study the Schrödinger equation.

=== Use in central extensions ===
The circle group serves an important role in projective representations of other groups. A projective unitary representation is a continuous group homomorphism from a group $G$ to the projective unitary group of a Hilbert space $H$, $\rho\colon G\to PU(H)$. Such a representation can be locally lifted to a function $\tilde \rho\colon G\to U(H)$ that makes a choice of phase factor, such that $\tilde \rho(g)\tilde \rho(h)=\omega(g,h)\tilde\rho(gh)$. The obstruction $\omega$ is a 2-cocycle on $G$ with values in the circle group. In this setting, the circle group is used to construct a group $\widetilde G$ for which the representation becomes linear rather than projective, by taking the central extension
$$1\to\mathbb T\to \widetilde G\to G\to 1$$
obtained by pulling back $U(H)\to PU(H)$ along $\rho$ and described algebraically by the cocycle $\omega$. This construction underlies the Heisenberg group, where phase factors give the central extension appearing in the canonical commutation relations and the Stone–von Neumann theorem. In conformal field theory, one version of the Virasoro group is a central extension of the oriented diffeomorphisms of the circle by the circle group.

== Ergodic theory ==
The circle group is a fundamental starting point in the study of ergodic theory and dynamical systems. For each $a\in\mathbb T=\mathbb R/\mathbb Z$, consider the operation of translation by $a$ on the circle group $\mathbb T$, $R_a\colon \mathbb T\to\mathbb T$, $R_a(x) = a+x$. Several natural questions are:

- What structure does the orbit of a point have? For instance, is it dense in the group? Is the orbit of a point equidistributed?
- What is the effect of averaging functions on the circle over many applications of the operator $R_a$?

The answers turn on whether $a$ is rational or irrational, that is whether $a\in\mathbb Q/\mathbb Z$ or not.

If $a$ is rational with (least) denominator $n$, then one has $R_a^n=1$, and so the orbits are periodic. If not, then the orbit is dense, and in fact equidistributed.

Similarly, the semigroup of translations $R_a,R_a^2,\dots$ is minimal and acts ergodically if and only if $a$ is irrational. It is uniquely ergodic in that case. One version of the ergodicity states that, given any Haar-integrable function $f$ on $\mathbb T$, the average value of $f$ over the whole circle is equal to the average of the function computed over the countable family translates $f(R_ax),f(R_a^2x),\dots$, for almost every $x$ More formally,
$$\frac1N\sum_{n=1}^N f(R_a^nx) \to \int_{\mathbb T} f(x)\,dx$$
for almost every $x$, and also in $L^1(\mathbb T)$.

== Line bundles and gauge theory ==
The circle group appears naturally in the theory of Hermitian complex line bundles over manifolds and algebraic varieties such as Riemann surfaces. If $L\to X$ is a complex line bundle with a Hermitian metric, the unit vectors in the fibers from a principal $U(1)$-bundle. Conversely, a principal $U(1)$-bundle determines an associated complex line bundle.

For suitable spaces, the isomorphism classes of principal $U(1)$-bundles are classified by the first Chern class, $c_1\in H^2(X;\mathbb Z)$. Equivalently, the classifying space of $U(1)$, $BU(1)$, is an infinite complex projective space $\mathbb{CP}^\infty$ of rays in a separable complex Hilbert space, whose second cohomology group is generated by the first Chern class.

In gauge theory, $U(1)$ is the structure group of electromagnetism. A connection on a principal $U(1)$-bundle may be represented locally by an imaginary-valued one-form $A$, which corresponds to the electromagnetic potential, whose curvature two-form $F=dA$ represents the field.

== Pontryagin duality and Banach algebras ==
The Pontryagin dual of the circle group is naturally isomorphic to the additive group of integers. The character corresponding to $n\in\mathbb Z$ is the homomorphism $\chi_n\colon \mathbb T\to\mathbb T$ given by $\chi_n(z)=z^n$. Conversely, the Pontryagin dual of the discrete group $\mathbb Z$ is naturally isomorphic to $\mathbb T$, because every character of the integers has the form $n\to z^n$ for some unit complex number $z$.

These dualities are reflected in the associated commutative Banach algebras. The group algebra $L^1(\mathbb T)$, with convolution, has Gelfand transform given by the Fourier transform, and its characters are indexed by $\mathbb Z$; equivalently its space of maximal ideals is $\mathbb Z$. In the opposite direction, the group algebra $\ell^1(\mathbb Z)$ has maximal ideal space naturally homeomorphic to $\mathbb T$. Its Gelfand transform maps a summable sequence $(a_n)_{n\in\mathbb Z}$ to the function $\textstyle z\mapsto \sum_{n\in\mathbb Z} a_n z^n$. The image is the Wiener algebra $A(\mathbb T)$, the algebra of continuous functions on the circle with absolutely convergent Fourier series. This is a proper subalgebra, under pointwise multiplication, of the Banach algebra $C(\mathbb T)$.

The same duality appears for group $C^*$-algebras. The group $C^*$-algebra of the discrete group $\mathbb Z$ is the universal unital $C^*$-algebra generated by one unitary element, and is naturally isomorphic to $C(\mathbb T)$; the generator corresponds to the coordinate function $z\mapsto z$. In the opposite direction, the group $C^*$-algebra of the circle group, formed using convolution on $\mathbb T$, is identified by the Fourier transform with $c_0(\mathbb Z)$, the space of bi-infinite sequences of complex numbers that tend to zero at $\pm\infty$. The statement encodes the Riemann-Lebesgue lemma for Fourier series.

The circle group also appears as the basic building block of solenoids. If $n_1,n_2,\ldots$ are integers with $|n_i|>1$, the inverse limit $\vphantom{\Bigg|}\mathbb T \xleftarrow{z~\!\mapsto z^{n_1}} \mathbb T\xleftarrow{z~\!\mapsto z^{n_2}} \cdots$ is a compact connected abelian group. Its Pontryagin dual is the direct limit $\vphantom{\bigg|}\mathbb Z \xrightarrow{\!\times n_1\,} \mathbb Z\xrightarrow{\!\times n_2\,} \cdots$, which may be identified with a rank-one subgroup of $\mathbb Q$. In this way solenoids are one-dimensional compact connected abelian groups obtained from the circle by inverse limits of covering homomorphisms.

Every Pontryagin dual of a torsion-free rank one discrete abelian group is either a circle or a solenoid. Here a torsion-free abelian group $A$ has rank one if $A\otimes_{\mathbb Z}\mathbb Q\cong\mathbb Q$; equivalently, $A$ is isomorphic to a nonzero subgroup of $\mathbb Q$. The cyclic rank-one group $\mathbb Z$ has dual $\mathbb T$; noncyclic rank-one subgroups of $\mathbb Q$ give the one-dimensional solenoids.

== Abstract group structure ==
The circle group $\mathbb T$ can be regarded as an abstract group without regard for its topology, or equivalently as a (non-compact) topological group equipped with the discrete topology.

The circle group is a divisible group. Its torsion subgroup is given by the set of all $n$-th roots of unity for all $n$ and is isomorphic to $\Q/\Z$. The structure theorem for divisible groups and the axiom of choice together tell us that $\mathbb T$ is isomorphic, as an abstract group, to the direct sum of $\Q/\Z$ with a number of copies of $\Q$.

The number of copies of $\Q$ must be $\mathfrak c$ (the cardinality of the continuum) in order for the cardinality of the direct sum to be correct. But the direct sum of $\mathfrak c$ copies of $\Q$ is isomorphic to $\R$, as $\R$ is a vector space of dimension $\mathfrak c$ over $\Q$. Thus, in this sense,
$$\mathbb T \cong \R \oplus (\Q/\Z).$$

The isomorphism of abstract groups
$$\C^\times \cong \R \oplus (\Q/\Z)$$
can be proved in the same way, since $\C^\times$ is also a divisible abelian group whose torsion subgroup is the same as the torsion subgroup of $\mathbb T$.

== Algebraic group structure ==
The circle group can also be viewed as an algebraic torus. The field norm from $\mathbb C$ to $\mathbb R$ is
$$N_{\mathbb C/\mathbb R}(z)=z\bar z=|z|^2,$$
and the circle group is the kernel of the norm homomorphism
$$N_{\mathbb C/\mathbb R}\colon \mathbb C^\times\to\mathbb R^\times.$$
Equivalently,
$$\mathbb T=\{z\in\mathbb C^\times:z\bar z=1\}.$$
In algebraic group terminology, this is the group of real points of the norm-one torus associated with the field extension $\mathbb C/\mathbb R$.

== Non-standard analysis ==
In non-standard analysis, the most natural replacement of the circle group is the hyperfinite cyclic group
$$C_N={}^*\mathbb Z/N{}^*\mathbb Z,$$
where $N$ is an infinite hyperinteger, that is a number that is greater than every standard natural number. The map $[k]\mapsto\operatorname{st}(k/N)\bmod\mathbb Z$, with $0\le k<N$ and $\operatorname{st}$ denoting the standard part, maps $C_N$ to the circle group $\mathbb R/\mathbb Z$. Moreover, it carries a natural normalized counting measure $\mu_N(A) = |A|/N$ on internal subsets, whose associated Loeb measure has pushforward under this map equal to the usual Haar measure on the circle group. The topology on the standard part is recovered by imposing an invariant metric on $C_N$.

The group $C_N$ is the natural setting for non-standard Fourier analysis. One reason is that, being a cyclic group, it is isomorphic to its dual group (internally). Non-standard Fourier series are ordinary (hyper-)finite sums. For continuous functions on the circle, standard Fourier coefficients are recovered by taking standard parts of normalized hyperfinite Riemann sums.

There is an embedding of $C_N$ into the non-standard circle ${}^*S^1$, but its image is a proper subgroup. The internal dual group of ${}^*S^1$, with continuity understood by transfer, is the full group of non-standard integers ${}^*\mathbb Z$, which is not hyperfinite, and so the Fourier theory on the full non-standard circle group is less finite.

== See also ==
- One-parameter subgroup
- n-sphere
- Orthogonal group
- Phase factor (application in quantum-mechanics)
- Rotation number
- Versor
