= Appell–Humbert theorem =

Describes the line bundles on a complex torus or complex abelian variety

In mathematics, the Appell–Humbert theorem describes the line bundles on a complex torus or complex abelian variety. It was proved for 2-dimensional tori by Appell (1891) and Humbert (1893), and in general by Lefschetz (1921)

== Statement ==
Suppose that $T$ is a complex torus given by $V/\Lambda$ where $\Lambda$ is a lattice in a complex vector space $V$. If $H$ is a Hermitian form on $V$ whose imaginary part $E = \text{Im}(H)$ is integral on $\Lambda\times\Lambda$, and $\alpha$ is a map from $\Lambda$ to the unit circle $U(1) = \{z \in \mathbb{C} : |z| = 1 \}$, called a semi-character, such that

$$\alpha(u+v) = e^{i\pi E(u,v)}\alpha(u)\alpha(v)\$$

then

$$\alpha(u)e^{\pi H(z,u)+H(u,u)\pi/2}\$$

is a 1-cocycle of $\Lambda$ defining a line bundle on $T$. For the trivial Hermitian form, this just reduces to a character. Note that the space of character morphisms is isomorphic with a real torus

$\text{Hom}_{\textbf{Ab}}(\Lambda,U(1)) \cong \mathbb{R}^{2n}/\mathbb{Z}^{2n}$

if $\Lambda \cong \mathbb{Z}^{2n}$ since any such character factors through $\mathbb{R}$ composed with the exponential map. That is, a character is a map of the form

$\text{exp}(2\pi i \langle l^*, -\rangle )$

for some covector $l^* \in V^*$. The periodicity of $\text{exp}(2\pi i f(x))$ for a linear $f(x)$ gives the isomorphism of the character group with the real torus given above. In fact, this torus can be equipped with a complex structure, giving the dual complex torus.

Explicitly, a line bundle on $T = V/\Lambda$ may be constructed by descent from a line bundle on $V$ (which is necessarily trivial) and a descent data, namely a compatible collection of isomorphisms $u^*\mathcal{O}_V \to \mathcal{O}_V$, one for each $u \in \Lambda$. Such isomorphisms may be presented as nonvanishing holomorphic functions on $V$, and for each $u$ the expression above is a corresponding holomorphic function.

The Appell–Humbert theorem (Mumford 2008) says that every line bundle on $T$ can be constructed like this for a unique choice of $H$ and $\alpha$ satisfying the conditions above.

== Ample line bundles ==
Lefschetz proved that the line bundle $L$, associated to the Hermitian form $H$ is ample if and only if $H$ is positive definite, and in this case $L^{\otimes 3}$ is very ample. A consequence is that the complex torus is algebraic if and only if there is a positive definite Hermitian form whose imaginary part is integral on $\Lambda\times\Lambda$

== See also ==
- Complex torus for a treatment of the theorem with examples
