= Tomsaete =

Anglo-Saxon clan

The Tomsaete or Tomsæte (dwellers of the Tame valley) were a tribe or clan in Anglo-Saxon England living in the valley of the River Tame in the West Midlands of England from around 500 and remaining around Tamworth throughout the existence of the Kingdom of Mercia. The tribe was identified as Anglian Mercens who came from the north, following the Trent Valley, and eventually settling along the valleys of the Tame.

An Anglo-Saxon charter of 849 describes an area of Cofton Hackett in the Lickey Hills south of Birmingham as "the boundary of the Tomsæte and the Pencersæte", and another charter of 835 describes Humberht as "Princeps of the Tomsæte", suggesting that the group retained its identity long after being subsumed into Mercia. The said boundary between Tomsæte and the Pencersæte often had Late Iron Age hill forts that also served as collecting points for territorial produce. As part of Mercia, the Tomsaete was considered an important early group that settled in the heartland.
