= Pencersæte =

Tribe or clan in Anglo-Saxon England

The Pencersæte (Old English: [ˈpentʃersæːte], "dwellers of the Penk valley") were a tribe or clan in Anglo-Saxon England. They lived in the valley of the River Penk in the West Midlands, and remained around Penkridge throughout the existence of the Kingdom of Mercia.

An Anglo-Saxon charter of 849 describes an area of Cofton Hackett in the Lickey Hills south of Birmingham as "the boundary of the Tomsæte and the Pencersæte".
