= Pincherle polynomials =

In mathematics, the Pincherle polynomials P_{n}(x) are polynomials introduced by S. Pincherle (1891) given by the generating function

$$\displaystyle (1-3xt+t^3)^{-1/2}=\sum^\infty
_{n=0}P_n(x)t^n$$

Humbert polynomials are a generalization of Pincherle polynomials.
