= Marie Henri Andoyer =

French astronomer and mathematician

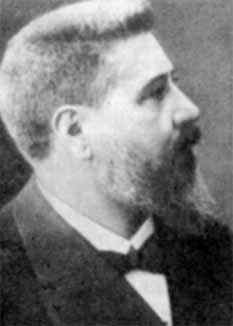
- Born: 1 October 1862; Paris, France
- Died: 12 June 1929 (aged 66); Paris, France
- Education: École Normale Supérieure; University of Paris (Phd)
- Spouse: Céleste Antoinette Marguerite Perissé (m. 1889)
- Children: 3
- Scientific career
- Fields: Mathematical astronomy
- Workplaces: Toulouse Observatory; Sorbonne University
- Thesis: Contribution à la théorie des orbites intermédiares (1886)

Marie Henri Andoyer (1 October 1862 – 12 June 1929) was a French astronomer and mathematician.

== Biography ==
Andoyer was born in Paris, 1 October 1862 to Marie Antionette Doubliez and Louis Jules Andoyer. His father was bureau chief at the Banque de France. Andoyer studied at the Lycée d’Harcourt, before attending the École Normale Supérieure, graduating in 1884 with a degree in mathematical sciences. The same year he began working at Toulouse Observatory and was a lecturer at the Faculty of Sciences in Toulouse.

In 1886 he was awarded a doctorate in mathematical sciences by the University of Paris. In 1889 he married Céleste Antoinette Marguerite Perissé, with whom he had three children. One of his sons was killed in World War I, his daughter married the mathematician Pierre Humbert.

From 1892 he taught at the Sorbonne, being elected a professor in 1903.

Andoyer was elected member of the French Académie des sciences on June 30, 1919 in the astronomy section. He was member of the Bureau des longitudes.

== Manuscripts ==
- Henri Andoyer. Nouvelles tables trigonométriques fondamentales. Valeurs naturelles (Bibliothèque de la Sorbonne, MS 1864-1875)

== Publications ==
- Many articles are available here: http://adsabs.harvard.edu/cgi-bin/nph-abs_connect?return_req=no_params&author=Andoyer,%20H.&db_key=AST
- On Mathematics:
  - Charles Hermite: Cours professé pendant le 2e semestre 1881-1882 [à la Faculté des sciences de Paris], written by Andoyer, 1882 (4th edition in 1891: )
  - On geometry:
    - Henri Andoyer: Sur un problème de géométrie, Annales de la Faculté des Sciences de Toulouse, Sér. 1 Vol. 3 (1889), p. D1-D6, http://archive.numdam.org/article/AFST_1889_1_3__D1_0.pdf
    - Henri Andoyer: Leçons élémentaires sur la théorie des formes et ses applications géométriques, à l'usage des candidats à l'agrégation des sciences mathématiques, 1898
    - Henri Andoyer: Leçons sur la théorie des formes et la géométrie analytique supérieure : à l'usage des étudiants des facultés des sciences. Tome I, 1900, http://www.hti.umich.edu/cgi/t/text/text-idx?c=umhistmath;idno=AAM8328
    - Henri Andoyer: Cours de géométrie : à l'usage des élèves de l'enseignement primaire supérieur : ouvrage rédigé conformément au programme officiel de 1893, 1894 (1st edition), 1895 (2nd edition), 1896 (3rd edition)
    - Henri Andoyer: Cours de géométrie, 1910
    - Henri Andoyer: Formule donnant la longueur de la géodésique joignant 2 points de l’ellipsoïde donnés par leurs coordonnées géographiques, Bulletin Géodésique, Volume 34, Number 1, April 1932, pages 77–81, https://doi.org/10.1007%2FBF03030136
  - On algebra:
    - Henri Andoyer: Cours d'algèbre à l'usage des élèves de l'enseignement primaire supérieur, 1896
  - On arithmetic:
    - Henri Andoyer : Cours d'arithmétique à l'usage des élèves de l'enseignement primaire supérieur, 2e édition, 1898
  - Miscellaneous :
    - D. Selivanov, J. Bauschinger, H. Andoyer : Calcul des différences et interpolation. Encyclopédie des sciences mathématiques pures et appliquées, tome I (4e volume), Calcul des probabilités, théorie des erreurs et applications diverses, Paris, Gauthier-Villars, 1906, p. 47-160.
- On the theory of the Moon:
  - Henri Andoyer: Sur quelques inégalités de la longitude de la lune, Annales de la Faculté des Sciences de Toulouse, Sér. 1 Vol. 6 no. 3 (1892), p. J1-J33, http://archive.numdam.org/article/AFST_1892_1_6_3_J1_0.pdf
  - Henri Andoyer: Sur quelques inégalités de la longitude de la Lune (deuxième mémoire), Annales de la Faculté des Sciences de Toulouse, Sér. 1 Vol. 7 no. 2 (1893), p. E1-E19, http://archive.numdam.org/article/AFST_1893_1_7_2_E1_0.pdf
  - Henri Andoyer: La Théorie de la lune, 1902, 1926, http://gallica.bnf.fr/ark:/12148/bpt6k82011r.r=.langFR
  - Henri Andoyer: Sur la théorie analytique du mouvement de la lune, Journal de mathématiques pures et appliquées, 9e série, tome 7, 1928, pages 61–74, https://web.archive.org/web/20110717152849/http://www-mathdoc.ujf-grenoble.fr/JMPA/PDF/JMPA_1928_9_7_A4_0.pdf
- On celestial mechanics in general:
  - Henri Andoyer : Sur la réduction du problème des brachistochrones aux équations canoniques, 1885. C.R. [Comptes Rendus des Séances de l'Académie des Sciences. Paris.] 100, 1577-1578. http://gallica.bnf.fr/ark:/12148/bpt6k3056t/f1577n2.capture
  - Henri Andoyer: Contribution à la théorie des orbites intermédiaires, Annales de la Faculté des Sciences de Toulouse, 1re série, tome 1, numéro 4, 1887, pages M1-M72, http://archive.numdam.org/ARCHIVE/AFST/AFST_1887_1_1_4/AFST_1887_1_1_4_M1_0/AFST_1887_1_1_4_M1_0.pdf
  - Henri Andoyer : Sur une équation différentielle que l'on rencontre dans la théorie des orbites intermédiaires, 1887. C.R. [Comptes Rendus des Séances de l'Académie des Sciences. Paris.] 104, 1425-1427. http://gallica.bnf.fr/ark:/12148/bpt6k30607/f1424n3.capture
  - Henri Andoyer: Sur les formules générales de la mécanique céleste, Annales de la Faculté des Sciences de Toulouse, Sér. 1 Vol. 4 no. 2 (1890), p. K1-K35, http://archive.numdam.org/article/AFST_1890_1_4_2_K1_0.pdf
  - Henri Andoyer : Sur l'extension que l'on peut donner au théorème de Poisson, relatif à l'invariabilité des grands axes, 1896. C.R. [Comptes Rendus des Séances de l'Académie des Sciences. Paris.] 123, 790-793. http://gallica.bnf.fr/ark:/12148/bpt6k30799/f790n4.capture
  - Henri Andoyer: Sur la détermination d'une orbite képlérienne par trois observations rapprochées, Bulletin Astronomique, Serie I, vol. 34 (1917), pp. 36–67 http://adsabs.harvard.edu/full/1917BuAsI..34...36A
  - Henri Andoyer: Formules et tables nouvelles : relatives à l'étude du mouvement des comètes et a différents problèmes de la théorie des orbites, 1918
  - Henri Andoyer: Cours de mécanique céleste, 1923 (volume 1), 1926 (volume 2), https://archive.org/details/coursdemcaniqu00andouoft (volume 1), https://archive.org/details/coursdemcaniqu01andouoft (volume 2)
- Tables of logarithms and trigonometric functions:
  - Henri Andoyer: Nouvelles tables trigonométriques fondamentales : contenant les logarithmes des lignes trigonométriques de centième en centième du quadrant avec dix-sept décimales, de neuf en neuf minutes avec quinze décimales, et de dix en dix secondes avec quatorze décimales, 1911 (reconstructed on http://locomat.loria.fr)
  - Henri Andoyer: Nouvelles tables trigonométriques fondamentales contenant les valeurs naturelles des lignes trigonométriques de centième en centième du quadrant avec vingt décimales, de neuf en neuf minutes avec dix-sept décimales et de dix en dix secondes avec quinze décimales, 1915-1918 (3 volumes), https://archive.org/details/nouvellestablest01andouoft, https://archive.org/details/nouvellestablest02andouoft, https://archive.org/details/nouvellestablest03andouoft (reconstructed on http://locomat.loria.fr)
  - Henri Andoyer: Tables logarithmiques à treize décimales, 1922 (review in 1923 by C. H. Forsyth, http://projecteuclid.org/DPubS/Repository/1.0/Disseminate?view=body&id=pdf_1&handle=euclid.bams/1183485665) (reconstructed on http://locomat.loria.fr)
  - Henri Andoyer: Tables fondamentales pour les logarithmes d'addition et de soustraction. In Bulletin Astronomique, volume 2, pages 5–32, 1922.
- Astronomy and cosmography:
  - F. Tisserand et H. Andoyer: Leçons de cosmographie, 1895, 1899, 1907 (4th edition), 1909 (5th edition), 1912 (6th edition), 1916 (7th edition), 1920 (8th edition), 1925 (9th edition), 1929 (10th edition), http://gallica.bnf.fr/ark:/12148/bpt6k95058b (review by Ernest W. Brown: Bull. Amer. Math. Soc. Volume 5, Number 5 (1899), 259. http://projecteuclid.org/DPubS/Repository/1.0/Disseminate?view=body&id=pdf_1&handle=euclid.bams/1183415717)
  - Henri Andoyer: Cours d'astronomie (only the first two volumes are by Andoyer).
    - volume 1: Astronomie théorique (1st edition: 1906 http://gallica.bnf.fr/ark:/12148/bpt6k947957, 2nd edition: 1911, 3rd edition: 1923)
    - volume 2: Astronomie pratique (1st edition: 1909 http://gallica.bnf.fr/ark:/12148/bpt6k94796k, 2nd edition (with A. Lambert): 1924)
    - volume 3: Astrophysique (1928, by Jean Bosler only) (review: A. Pogo, Astrophysical Journal, volume 69, page 242, 1929 http://adsabs.harvard.edu/full/1929ApJ....69..242P)
- Historical works:
  - Henri Andoyer: L'œuvre scientifique de Laplace, 1922, https://archive.org/details/loeuvrescientifi00andouoft
  - Henri Andoyer, Pierre Humbert, Histoire de la Nation Française. Tome XIV, Histoire des Sciences en France; première partie, Histoire des Mathématiques, de la Mécanique et de l'Astronomie. Paris, 1924. xx+620 pp
- Notice sur les travaux scientifiques de M. H. Andoyer, (several versions : 1902 (29 pages), 1904 (32 pages), 1907 (58 pages), 1918 (28 pages))
