= James Feyrer =

Academic background
- Education: Brown University; Stanford University

Academic work
- Discipline: Macroeconomics; Economic growth Productivity
- Institutions: Dartmouth College
- Website: www.dartmouth.edu/~jfeyrer/; Information at IDEAS / RePEc

James Donald Feyrer (born May 27, 1968) is a Professor of Economics at Dartmouth College, and the vice-chair of Dartmouth's Department of Economics. His research focuses on economic growth, macroeconomics and productivity.

== Education ==
Feyrer graduated from Stanford University in 1990 with a B.A. in Mechanical Engineering and from Brown University in 2001 with a Ph.D. in Economics.

== Career and research ==
Feyrer was previously a visiting associate professor at the Massachusetts Institute of Technology. As of 2010 he was also a Faculty Research Fellow at the National Bureau of Economic Research. His work has been published in journals including the Journal of Economic Perspectives, Population and Development Review, the Quarterly Journal of Economics and The Review of Economics and Statistics. He is a co-editor of the Journal of Development Economics.

A 2005 working paper by Feyrer found a correlation between economic productivity and the proportion of its workforce who were aged between 40 and 49. In 2012 the National Research Council's Committee on the Long-Run Macroeconomic Effects of the Aging U.S. Population described Feyrer's conclusions as "implausible"; however in 2016 Jason Furman, the chair of the Council of Economic Advisers in the Executive Office of the President, said that research since 2012 supported Feyrer's results.

A 2011 study by Feyrer and Bruce Sacerdote found that the American Recovery and Reinvestment Act of 2009, a stimulus package designed to protect and create jobs, had a positive effect on employment. Their methodology involved comparing stimulus spending with employment growth at the state and county level in the 20 months following the passing of the legislation, and comparing state-level spending and employment on a month-by-month basis. Dylan Matthews of The Washington Post named Feyrer and Sacerdote's study one of the nine "best studies" on the Recovery Act.

A 2013 National Bureau of Economic Research working paper by Feyrer, Dimitra Politi and David N. Weil found that the introduction of iodized salt in the United States in 1924 resulted in a 15-point increase in IQ in iodine-deficient areas, and a 3.5-point increase nationally.

A 2015 study led by Feyrer found that the expansion of hydraulic fracturing (fracking) in the United States resulted in an increase in employment, most of which was centered on the county where fracking occurred. The study found that 13 percent of the total value of production from fracking stayed within the county, and 36 percent within 100 miles of the well.

In 2024, Feyrer signed a faculty letter supporting the actions of Dartmouth College president Sian Beilock, who ordered the arrests of 90 students and faculty members nonviolently protesting the Gaza war.
