= Umberto Meoli =

Italian historian of economics

- Born: 26 August 1920; Padua
- Died: 17 May 2002 (aged 81)
- Occupation: Historian of economics
- Spouse: Rachel Toulmin

Umberto Meoli (26 August 1920 – 17 May 2002) was an Italian historian of economics, known as a maverick of the Italian leftists who eschewed Marxism in favour of British pragmatism.

== Biography ==
=== Early life ===
Meoli was born in Padua, one of nineteen brothers; his father was a pharmacist from a small town near Benevento, and his mother was from Padua.

=== Education ===
In 1940, at age 20, Meoli began his service in the Italian Army fighting in World War II, and, three years later, with the Resistance after the 1943 armistice between Italy and the Allied armed forces. As a result, Meoli was imprisoned by the Benito Mussolini Fascist government, and spent several months in the Palazzo Giusti detention center in Padua. The Palazzo Giusti detention center was notorious for the cruelty of some Fascists in Padua during the Italian Social Republic. For example, Giovanni Gonelli, a barely literate jail keeper at Palazzo Giusti in Padua and a member of the Banda Carità, apparently enjoyed dehumanizing his prisoners by refusing their requests for food or blankets. The sentence of the Appellate Court of 8 January 1946 states that Gonelli would tell prisoners who asked for water to "piss and drink." There is no doubt that Meoli experienced such cruelty while imprisoned in Palazzo Giusti, and that this cruelty affected his thoughts.

=== Marriage and children ===
In 1961 Meoli married Rachel Toulmin, an Englishwoman and lecturer at Padua University. Rachel Toulmin was the younger sister of Stephen Toulmin, a historian and philosopher of science at the University of Southern California.

=== Academia ===
Meoli was briefly a Communist, and after graduating, he worked for a time in the trade unions (Camera del Lavoro) in Vicenza, but he was soon at odds with the rigid militancy of organized labor. He found his vocation in the late 1950s, when he obtained a teaching post at the University of Parma.

It was during his time at Camera del Lavoro that Meoli became influenced by the Canadian Harry Gordon Johnson, one of the most active and prolific economists of all time. Gordon's main research was in the area of international trade, international finance, and monetary policy. In 1961, Meoli made a special journey to the University of Manchester in England to meet Johnson. He quickly became a close friend of both Philip Andrews, a senior researcher at Nuffield College at the time, and his research assistant Elizabeth Brunner, with whom Meoli shared an admiration for Alfred Marshall and a more skeptical view of John Maynard Keynes.

In 1961, Meoli published the first book in steady flow of books, in which would increasingly concentrate on the history of economic thought and ideas.

By 1970, Meoli became Professor of the History of Economic Thought at Camera del Lavoro, and shortly afterwards was invited to occupy a similar chair at the University of Venice.

== Italian academic circles ==
In addition to his chair positions, from 1992 to 1998 Umberto Meoli was president of the Italian Association for the History of Economic Thought (L'Associazione Italiana per la Storia del Pensiero Economico, AISPE).

Meoli always thought of himself as a man of the Left. However, he early became convinced of the unacceptable limitations of Marxist economic theory, and his books and articles struck many of his leftist colleagues as a kind of apostasy. Meoli's writings exhibited an ever-growing respect for British pragmatism, and the economic liberalism of Adam Smith, David Ricardo, and Alfred Marshall. As an example of his unconventional approach, the figure of Gustav von Schmoller has been highlighted by authors like Francesco Traniello, who has indicated the importance that Schmoller, like Gustav von Schönberg, Adolph Wagner and Albert Schäffle, among others, gave the ethical element of the political Economy, whereas Umberto Meoli associates the figure of Schmoller to those of Lujo Brentano and Karl Bücher as the most representative authors of the development of the Economic Historiography. Eventually seen in Italian academic circles as a maverick and a great Anglophile, Meoli's leftist friends tolerated the irony, largely because Meoli would comment on their dismay with sudden eruptions of laughter.

== Works ==
- Umberto Meoli, Lineamenti di storia delle idee economiche, unknown binding, UTET Libreria, ISBN 88-7750-018-2

== See also ==
- History of economic thought
