= Pierre Humbert (mathematician) =

French mathematician (1891–1953)

Pierre Humbert (13 June 1891, Paris – 17 November 1953, Montpellier) was a French mathematician who worked on the theory of elliptic functions and introduced Humbert polynomials. He was the son of the mathematician Georges Humbert and married the daughter of Henri Andoyer.

Pierre Humbert was an Invited Speaker of the ICM in 1928 in Bologna.

== See also ==
- Humbert series

== Publications ==
- Introduction à l'études des fonctions elliptiques, à l'usage des étudiants des facultés des sciences, Paris, Hermann 1922
- with Henri Andoyer: Histoire de la Nation Française. Tome XIV, Histoire des Sciences en France; première partie, Histoire des Mathématiques, de la Mécanique et de l'Astronomie. Paris 1924
- Calcul Symbolique, Paris, Hermann 1934
- with Serge Colombo: Le calcul symbolique et ses applications à la physique mathématique, Paris, Gauthier-Villars 1949, 2nd edn. 1965
- Potentiels et Prepotentiels, Gauthier-Villars 1937
- Exercises numeriques d´ astronomie, Paris 1933
- L´Oeuvre astronomique de Gassendi, Hermann 1936
- Histoire des découvertes astronomiques, Paris 1948 (book for young people)
- Pierre Duhem, Paris 1934
- Philosophes et Savants, Paris, Flammarion 1953
- with Serge Colombo: Introduction mathématique à l’étude des théories électromagnétiques, Gauthier-Villars 1949
