= Alfred Galichon =

French economist and mathematician (born 1977)

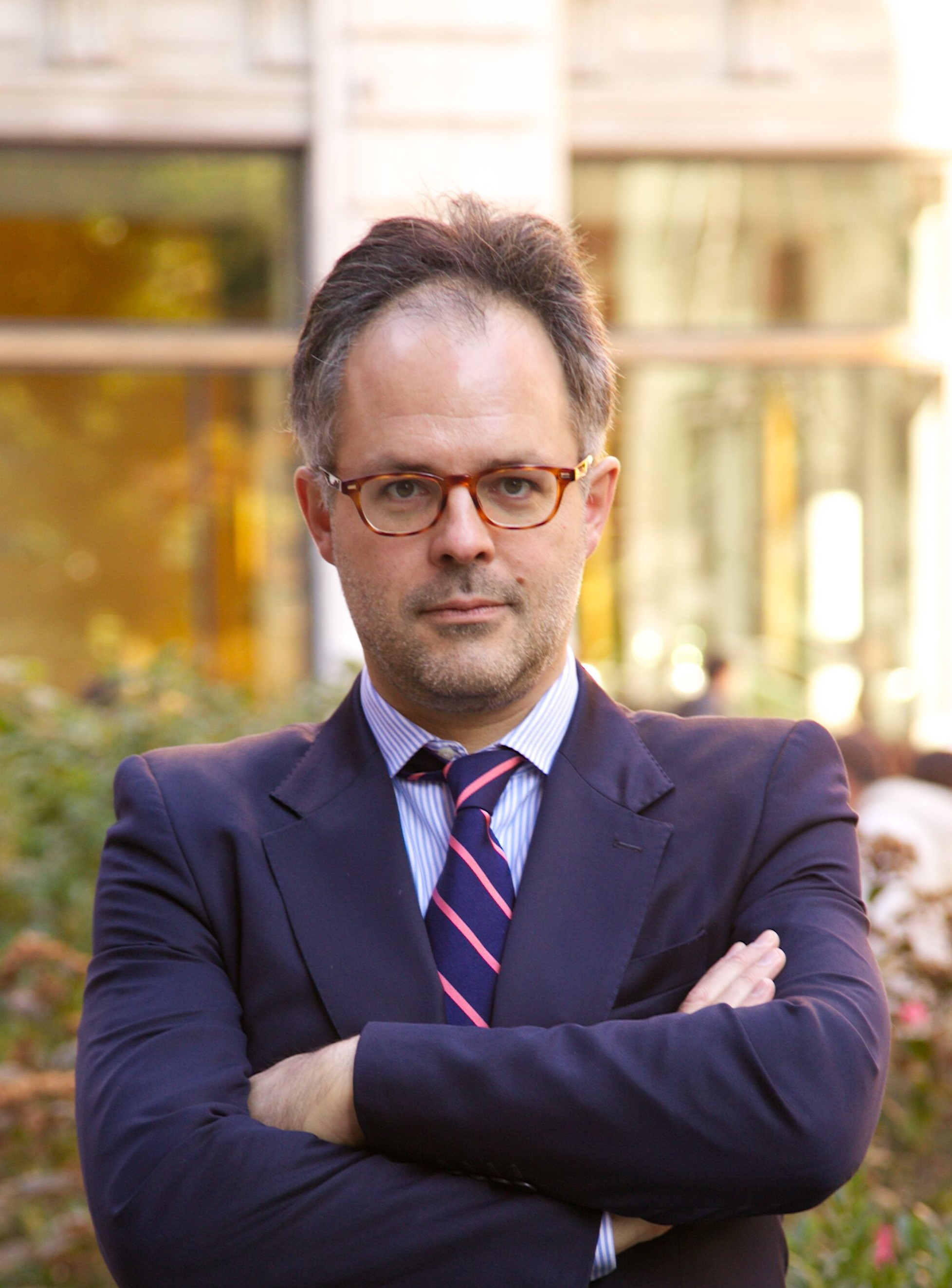
- Alfred Galichon
- Born: May 4, 1977 (age 49); Paris, France
- Education: École Polytechnique; École des Mines; Harvard University
- Awards: Edmond Malinvaud Prize of the French Association of Economic Sciences (2015)
- Scientific career
- Fields: Quantitative economics; econometrics; applied mathematics; optimal transport; data science
- Workplaces: (current) New York University; (formerly) École Polytechnique; (formerly) Sciences Po
- Doctoral advisor: Guido Imbens
- Website: alfredgalichon.com

Alfred Galichon (French pronunciation: [alfʁɛd ɡaliʃɔ̃]; born May 4, 1977) is a French economist and mathematician. His work focuses on quantitative economics and econometrics. He is a professor of economics and of mathematics at New York University.

== Life and work ==
Galichon was born in Paris. He is a professor at New York University in the Courant Institute, and the director of NYU Paris. Previously, he had been a full professor at Ecole Polytechnique, and then at Sciences Po, Paris. He is a graduate of Ecole Polytechnique and Corps des Mines, and holds a PhD in Economics from Harvard University.

His work lies within quantitative economics, in particular on the economic applications of optimal transport. He has contributed to the econometrics of matching markets, discrete choice models, martingale optimal transport, and quantile regression.

He is a fellow of the Econometric Society and the author of Optimal Transport Methods in Economics.

== Research ==
Galichon is the author of more than forty peer-reviewed articles. His research has been funded by the National Science Foundation (2017-2020) and twice by the European Research Council, for a total amount of approximately 3 million Euros.

== Awards and distinctions ==
- Edmond Malinvaud Prize from the French Association of Economic Sciences, 2015.
- Starting grant, European Research Council, 2013-2016.
- 'Young Leader' of the French-American Foundation, 2018.
- Economic Theory Fellow, 2019.
- Fellow of the Econometric Society, 2020.
- Consolidator grant, European Research Council, 2020-2025.

== Selected publications ==
=== Books ===
- Galichon, Alfred (April 21, 2026). Discrete Choice Models: Mathematical Methods, Econometrics, and Data Science. Princeton, NJ, USA: Princeton University Press. p. 376. ISBN 9780691221809.
- Galichon, Alfred (September 6, 2016). Optimal Transport Methods in Economics. Princeton, NJ, USA: Princeton University Press. p. 184. ISBN 9780691172767.
- Véron, Nicolas; Autret, Matthieu; Galichon, Alfred (2006). Smoke & Mirrors, Inc: Accounting for Capitalism. Ithaca, NY, USA: Cornell University Press. p. 233. ISBN 0801444160.

=== Articles ===
- Chernozhukov, Victor; Fernández-Val, Iván; Galichon, Alfred (2009). "Improving point and interval estimators of monotone functions by rearrangement". Biometrika. 96 (3). Oxford University Press: 559–575. arXiv:0806.4730. doi:10.1093/biomet/asp030. JSTOR 27798848.
- Chernozhukov, Victor; Fernández-Val, Iván; Galichon, Alfred (May 21, 2010). "Quantile and Probability Curves Without Crossing". Econometrica. 78 (3): 1093–1125. arXiv:0704.3649. doi:10.3982/ECTA7880. S2CID 10238289.
- Dupuy, Arnaud; Galichon, Alfred (2014). "Personality Traits and the Marriage Market". Journal of Political Economy. 122 (6): 1271–1319. arXiv:2102.07476. doi:10.1086/677191. S2CID 53660184.
- Galichon, Alfred; Henry-Labordère, Pierre; Touzi, Nizar (2014). "A stochastic control approach to no-arbitrage bounds given marginals, with an application to lookback options". The Annals of Applied Probability. 24 (1): 312–336. arXiv:1401.3921. doi:10.1214/13-AAP925.
- Galichon, Alfred; Henry, Marc (2011). "Set identification in models with multiple equilibria". The Review of Economic Studies. 78 (4): 1264–1298. arXiv:2102.12249. doi:10.1093/restud/rdr008. JSTOR 41407061.
- Galichon, Alfred; Salanie, Bernard (2020). "Cupid's invisible hand: Social surplus and identification in matching models". SSRN Scholarly Paper. ID: 1804623. Rochester, NY, USA: Social Science Research Network. arXiv:2106.02371. SSRN 1804623.
