= Pincherle derivative =

Type of derivative of a linear operator

In mathematics, the Pincherle derivative $T'$ of a linear operator $T: \mathbb{K}[x] \to \mathbb{K}[x]$ on the vector space of polynomials in the variable x over a field $\mathbb{K}$ is the commutator of $T$ with the multiplication by x in the algebra of endomorphisms $\operatorname{End}(\mathbb{K}[x])$. That is, $T'$ is another linear operator $T': \mathbb{K}[x] \to \mathbb{K}[x]$

$$T' := [T,x] = Tx-xT = -\operatorname{ad}(x)T,\,$$

(for the origin of the $\operatorname{ad}$ notation, see the article on the adjoint representation) so that

$$T'\{p(x)\}=T\{xp(x)\}-xT\{p(x)\}\qquad\forall p(x)\in \mathbb{K}[x].$$

This concept is named after the Italian mathematician Salvatore Pincherle (1853–1936).

== Properties ==
The Pincherle derivative, like any commutator, is a derivation, meaning it satisfies the sum and products rules: given two linear operators $S$ and $T$ belonging to $\operatorname{End}\left( \mathbb{K}[x] \right),$

1. $(T + S)^\prime = T^\prime + S^\prime$;
2. $(TS)^\prime = T^\prime\!S + TS^\prime$ where $TS = T \circ S$ is the composition of operators.

One also has $[T,S]^{\prime} = [T^{\prime}, S] + [T, S^{\prime}]$ where $[T,S] = TS - ST$ is the usual Lie bracket, which follows from the Jacobi identity.

The usual derivative, D = d/dx, is an operator on polynomials. By straightforward computation, its Pincherle derivative is

$$D'= \left({d \over {dx}}\right)' = \operatorname{Id}_{\mathbb K [x]} = 1.$$

This formula generalizes to

$$(D^n)'= \left({{d^n} \over {dx^n}}\right)' = nD^{n-1},$$

by induction. This proves that the Pincherle derivative of a differential operator

$$\partial = \sum a_n {{d^n} \over {dx^n} } = \sum a_n D^n$$

is also a differential operator, so that the Pincherle derivative is a derivation of $\operatorname{Diff}(\mathbb K [x])$.

When $\mathbb{K}$ has characteristic zero, the shift operator

$$S_h(f)(x) = f(x+h) \,$$

can be written as

$$S_h = \sum_{n \ge 0} {{h^n} \over {n!} }D^n$$

by the Taylor formula. Its Pincherle derivative is then

$$S_h' = \sum_{n \ge 1} {{h^n} \over {(n-1)!} }D^{n-1} = h \cdot S_h.$$

In other words, the shift operators are eigenvectors of the Pincherle derivative, whose spectrum is the whole space of scalars $\mathbb{K}$.

If T is shift-equivariant, that is, if T commutes with S_{h} or $[T,S_h] = 0$, then we also have $[T',S_h] = 0$, so that $T'$ is also shift-equivariant and for the same shift $h$.

The "discrete-time delta operator"

$$(\delta f)(x) = {{ f(x+h) - f(x) } \over h }$$

is the operator

$$\delta = {1 \over h} (S_h - 1),$$

whose Pincherle derivative is the shift operator $\delta' = S_h$.

== See also ==
- Commutator
- Delta operator
- Umbral calculus
