= Humbert series =

In mathematics, Humbert series are a set of seven hypergeometric series Φ_{1}, Φ_{2}, Φ_{3}, Ψ_{1}, Ψ_{2}, Ξ_{1}, Ξ_{2} of two variables that generalize Kummer's confluent hypergeometric series _{1}F_{1} of one variable and the confluent hypergeometric limit function _{0}F_{1} of one variable. The first of these double series was introduced by Pierre Humbert (1920).

== Definitions ==
The Humbert series Φ_{1} is defined for |x| < 1 by the double series:

$$\Phi_1(a,b,c;x,y) = F_1(a,b,-,c;x,y) = \sum_{m,n=0}^\infty \frac{(a)_{m+n} (b)_m} {(c)_{m+n} \,m! \,n!} \,x^m y^n ~,$$

where the Pochhammer symbol (q)_{n} represents the rising factorial:

$$(q)_n = q\,(q+1) \cdots (q+n-1) = \frac{\Gamma(q+n)}{\Gamma(q)}~,$$

where the second equality is true for all complex $q$ except $q=0,-1,-2,\ldots$.

For other values of x the function Φ_{1} can be defined by analytic continuation.

The Humbert series Φ_{1} can also be written as a one-dimensional Euler-type integral:

$$\Phi_1(a,b,c;x,y) = \frac{\Gamma(c)} {\Gamma(a) \Gamma(c-a)}
\int_0^1 t^{a-1} (1-t)^{c-a-1} (1-xt)^{-b} e^{yt} \,\mathrm{d}t,
\quad \real \,c > \real \,a > 0 ~.$$

This representation can be verified by means of Taylor expansion of the integrand, followed by termwise integration.

Similarly, the function Φ_{2} is defined for all x, y by the series:

$$\Phi_2(b_1,b_2,c;x,y) = F_1(-,b_1,b_2,c;x,y) = \sum_{m,n=0}^\infty \frac{(b_1)_m (b_2)_n} {(c)_{m+n} \,m! \,n!} \,x^m y^n ~,$$

the function Φ_{3} for all x, y by the series:

$$\Phi_3(b,c;x,y) = \Phi_2(b,-,c;x,y) = F_1(-,b,-,c;x,y) = \sum_{m,n=0}^\infty \frac{(b)_m} {(c)_{m+n} \,m! \,n!} \,x^m y^n ~,$$

the function Ψ_{1} for |x| < 1 by the series:

$$\Psi_1(a,b,c_1,c_2;x,y) = F_2(a,b,-,c_1,c_2;x,y) = \sum_{m,n=0}^\infty \frac{(a)_{m+n} (b)_m} {(c_1)_m (c_2)_n \,m! \,n!} \,x^m y^n ~,$$

the function Ψ_{2} for all x, y by the series:

$$\Psi_2(a,c_1,c_2;x,y) = \Psi_1(a,-,c_1,c_2;x,y) = F_2(a,-,-,c_1,c_2;x,y) = F_4(a,-,c_1,c_2;x,y) = \sum_{m,n=0}^\infty \frac{(a)_{m+n}} {(c_1)_m (c_2)_n \,m! \,n!} \,x^m y^n ~,$$

the function Ξ_{1} for |x| < 1 by the series:

$$\Xi_1(a_1,a_2,b,c;x,y) = F_3(a_1,a_2,b,-,c;x,y) = \sum_{m,n=0}^\infty \frac{(a_1)_m (a_2)_n (b)_m} {(c)_{m+n} \,m! \,n!} \,x^m y^n ~,$$

and the function Ξ_{2} for |x| < 1 by the series:

$$\Xi_2(a,b,c;x,y) = \Xi_1(a,-,b,c;x,y) = F_3(a,-,b,-,c;x,y) = \sum_{m,n=0}^\infty \frac{(a)_m (b)_m} {(c)_{m+n} \,m! \,n!} \,x^m y^n ~.$$

== Related series ==
There are four related series of two variables, F_{1}, F_{2}, F_{3}, and F_{4}, which generalize Gauss's hypergeometric series _{2}F_{1} of one variable in a similar manner and which were introduced by Paul Émile Appell in 1880.
