= Marie Georges Humbert =

French mathematician (1859–1921)

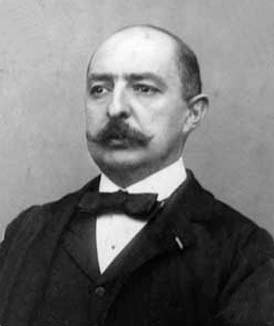
- Born: 7 January 1859; Paris, France
- Died: 22 January 1921 (aged 62); Paris, France
- Children: Pierre Humbert
- Scientific career
- Fields: Mathematics
- Thesis: Sur les courbes de genre un (1885)
- Doctoral advisor: Camille Jordan and Charles Hermite
- Doctoral students: Gaston Julia

Marie Georges Humbert (7 January 1859 Paris, France – 22 January 1921 Paris, France) was a French mathematician who worked on Kummer surfaces and the Appell–Humbert theorem and introduced Humbert surfaces. His son was the mathematician Pierre Humbert. He won the Poncelet Prize of the Académie des Sciences in 1891.

He studied at the École Polytechnique. He was the brother-in-law of Charles Mangin.

== Works ==
- Application de la théorie des fonctions fuchsiennes à l'étude des courbes algébriques, Journal de mathematiques pure et appliquées, 4th Series, Vol. 2, 1886, pp. 239–328
- Pierre Humbert, Gaston Julia (Editor): Georges Humbert- Oeuvres, Gauthier-Villars 1929
- Cours d'Analyse, 2 volumes, Gauthier-Villars 1902, 1904 (Lecturers given at École Polytechnique)
