= Character group =

In mathematics, a character group is the group of representations of an abelian group by complex-valued functions. These functions can be thought of as one-dimensional matrix representations and so are special cases of the group characters that arise in the related context of character theory. Whenever a group is represented by matrices, the function defined by the trace of the matrices is called a character; however, these traces do not in general form a group. Some important properties of these one-dimensional characters apply to characters in general:

- Characters are invariant on conjugacy classes.
- The characters of irreducible representations are orthogonal.

The primary importance of the character group for finite abelian groups is in number theory, where it is used to construct Dirichlet characters. The character group of the cyclic group also appears in the theory of the discrete Fourier transform. For locally compact abelian groups, the character group (with an assumption of continuity) is central to Fourier analysis.

== Preliminaries ==
Let $G$ be an abelian group. A function $f: G \to \mathbb{C}^\times$ mapping $G$ to the group of non-zero complex numbers $\mathbb{C}^\times = \mathbb{C}\setminus\{0\}$ is called a character of $G$ if it is a group homomorphism—that is, if $f(g_1 g_2) = f(g_1)f(g_2)$ for all $g_1, g_2 \in G$.

If $f$ is a character of a finite group (or more generally a torsion group) $G$, then each function value $f(g)$ is a root of unity, since for each $g \in G$ there exists $k \in \mathbb{N}$ such that $g^k = e$, and hence $f(g)^k = f(g^k) = f(e) = 1$.

A finite abelian group of order n has exactly n distinct characters. These are denoted by f_{1}, ..., f_{n}. The function f_{1} is the trivial representation, which is given by $f_1(g) = 1$ for all $g \in G$. It is called the principal character of G; the others are called the non-principal characters.

== Definition ==
If G is an abelian group, then the set of characters f_{k} forms an abelian group under pointwise multiplication. That is, the product of characters $f_j$ and $f_k$ is defined by $(f_j f_k)(g) = f_j(g) f_k(g)$ for all $g \in G$. This group is the character group of G and is sometimes denoted as $\hat{G}$. The identity element of $\hat{G}$ is the principal character f_{1}, and the inverse of a character f_{k} is its reciprocal 1/f_{k}. If $G$ is finite of order n, then $\hat{G}$ is also of order n. In this case, since $|f_k(g)| = 1$ for all $g \in G$, the inverse of a character is equal to the complex conjugate.

=== Alternative definition ===
There is another definition of character group^{pg 29} which uses $U(1) = \{z \in \mathbb{C}^*: |z|=1 \}$ as the target instead of just $\mathbb{C}^*$. This is useful when studying complex tori because the character group of the lattice in a complex torus $V/\Lambda$ is canonically isomorphic to the dual torus via the Appell–Humbert theorem. That is,

$\text{Hom}(\Lambda, U(1)) \cong V^\vee\!/\Lambda^\vee = X^\vee$

We can express explicit elements in the character group as follows: recall that elements in $U(1)$ can be expressed as

$e^{2\pi i x}$

for $x \in \mathbb{R}$. If we consider the lattice as a subgroup of the underlying real vector space of $V$, then a homomorphism

$\phi: \Lambda \to U(1)$

can be factored as a map

$\phi : \Lambda \to \mathbb{R} \xrightarrow{\exp({2\pi i \cdot })} U(1)$

This follows from elementary properties of homomorphisms. Note that

$$\begin{align}
\phi(x+y) &= \exp({2\pi i }f(x+y)) \\
&= \phi(x) + \phi(y) \\
&= \exp(2\pi i f(x))\exp(2\pi i f(y))
\end{align}$$

giving us the desired factorization. As the group

$\text{Hom}(\Lambda,\mathbb{R}) \cong \text{Hom}(\mathbb{Z}^{2n},\mathbb{R})$

we have the isomorphism of the character group, as a group, with the group of homomorphisms of $\mathbb{Z}^{2n}$ to $\mathbb{R}$. Since $\text{Hom}(\mathbb{Z},G)\cong G$ for any abelian group $G$, we have

$\text{Hom}(\mathbb{Z}^{2n}, \mathbb{R}) \cong \mathbb{R}^{2n}$

after composing with the complex exponential, we find that

$\text{Hom}(\mathbb{Z}^{2n}, U(1)) \cong \mathbb{R}^{2n}/\mathbb{Z}^{2n}$

which is the expected result.

== Examples ==
=== Finitely generated abelian groups ===
Since every finitely generated abelian group is isomorphic to

$G \cong \mathbb{Z}^n \oplus \bigoplus_{i=1}^m \mathbb{Z}/a_i$

the character group can be easily computed in all finitely generated cases. From universal properties, and the isomorphism between finite products and coproducts, we have the character groups of $G$ is isomorphic to

$\text{Hom}(\mathbb{Z},\mathbb{C}^*)^{\oplus n}\oplus\bigoplus_{i=1}^k\text{Hom}(\mathbb{Z}/n_i,\mathbb{C}^*)$

for the first case, this is isomorphic to $(\mathbb{C}^*)^{\oplus n}$, the second is computed by looking at the maps which send the generator $1 \in \mathbb{Z}/n_i$ to the various powers of the $n_i$-th roots of unity $\zeta_{n_i} = \exp(2\pi i/n_i)$.

== Orthogonality of characters ==
Consider the $n \times n$ matrix A = A(G) whose matrix elements are $A_{jk} = f_j(g_k)$ where $g_k$ is the kth element of G.

The sum of the entries in the jth row of A is given by

$\sum_{k=1}^n A_{jk} = \sum_{k=1}^n f_j(g_k) = 0$ if $j \neq 1$, and
$$\sum_{k=1}^n A_{1k} = n$$.

The sum of the entries in the kth column of A is given by

$\sum_{j=1}^n A_{jk} = \sum_{j=1}^n f_j(g_k) = 0$ if $k \neq 1$, and
$$\sum_{j=1}^n A_{j1} = \sum_{j=1}^n f_j(e) = n$$.

Let $A^\ast$ denote the conjugate transpose of A. Then

$$AA^\ast = A^\ast A = nI$$.

This implies the desired orthogonality relationship for the characters: i.e.,

$$\sum_{k=1}^n {f_k}^* (g_i) f_k (g_j) = n \delta_{ij}$$,

where $\delta_{ij}$ is the Kronecker delta and $f^*_k (g_i)$ is the complex conjugate of $f_k (g_i)$.

== See also ==
- Pontryagin duality
