= Humberht of the Tomsaete =

Humberht (fl. 835–866) was an official (titled duke or prince) among the Tomsaete, who was granted land in Derbyshire in return for what he would provide annually to Christ Church in Canterbury.
