= Philip Andrews (economist) =

British industrial economist (1914–1971)

Philip Walter Sawford Andrews (1914 – 1971) was an industrial economist. He spent most of his career at Oxford University as a fellow of Nuffield College, and finished his career, from 1967, as Foundation Professor of Economics at the University of Lancaster. He made his name with his detailed case study investigations of business behaviour and analysis of manufacturing firms, which he characterized as intensely competitive and oligopolistic. Andrews advocated for the use of empirical business case studies to advance industrial economics, writing in the Journal of Industrial Economics in 1952 that "empirical work on actual businesses" could help economists understand "prices in general" and generate a "workable theory" of business behaviour. He was founding editor of the Journal of Industrial Economics. From 1944 until his death in 1971 he worked and published with Elizabeth Brunner.

== Economics ==
Andrews' work has been summarized as follows. He rejected the concept of individual firm equilibrium in favour of what he describes as the 'steady state' in the industry. That at the heart of Andrew's story is his argument that manufacturing industry tend to be both oligopolistic and rather competitive in the long run. Also that actual or potential entry sets a limit to the price in each industry. Price is arrived at by adding a 'costing margin' to estimated average direct cost with this margin being calculated on the basis of estimates of 'normal' output and the profit that can be obtained without long run loss of custom due to competition. If there is an 'equilibrium', about which doubts are raised, it is the equilibrium price in the industry price rather than an equilibrium for an individual firm's output at a level where marginal cost equals marginal revenue. The share of the market share of each firm will depend on dynamic factors that determine the amount that the firm is able to sell at the going industry price. Thus, although large firms are thought likely in fact to be multiproduct each industry is analysable independently of the number of other industries in which a firm is active.

== Interpretations ==
Rather than viewing Andrews as having denied profit maximisation, Devine suggests that one should view his work as having raised 'the possibility that our existing method of theorizing may give wrong clues as to how profits maybe maximised'. For Devine the main thrust Andrew's argument is directed against 'the influence of atomistic methodology, which it is easy to argue from but difficult to argue to'. This is the methodology that, from Andrews's point of view, misleadingly focuses attention upon the equilibrium position of the firm. In the long run, Andrews argued, it is 'possible to question the analytical independence of cost and demand functions, which marginal equilibrium theorists take for granted and which, indeed, is essential for the formal validity of their work'.

Post-Keynesian economists draw on his work.

== Key works ==
- 1949 Manufacturing Business, Macmillan
- 1964 On Competition in Economic Theory
