= Matías Chiacchio =

Argentine footballer

Matias Chiacchio
- Chiacchio in the Lecco first team in 2005

Personal information
- Full name: Matias Alejandro Chiacchio
- Date of birth: 13 May 1988 (age 38)
- Place of birth: Necochea, Argentina
- Height: 1.86 m (6 ft 1 in)
- Position: Striker

Youth career
- 2004: Atlético Madrid
- 2004–2005: Rayo Majadahonda
- 2004–2005: Lecco

Senior career*
Years	Team	Apps	(Gls)
2005–2007	Lecco	19	(1)
2007–2008	Lyon B	12	(5)
2008–2009	→ FC Francavilla (loan)	?	(?)
2009–2010	Alavés B	2	(0)
2011	Noja		

International career
2007	Argentina U-20		
- * Club domestic league appearances and goals

Matias Alejandro Chiacchio (born 13 May 1988) is an Argentine former professional footballer who played as a striker.

== Career ==
Chiacchio began his career in Spain with Atlético Madrid and Rayo Majadahonda, before joining the youth ranks of Lecco. At Lecco, he was called up to the first team who were at the time playing in Serie C. He made 19 appearances with the club. Chiacchio was spotted by Jean-Marc Chanelet of Lyon and was put on trial with Lyon's CFA squad. Following his success, he was signed immediately and spent the rest of the season in the CFA. He was part of the preliminary squad for the Argentina national under-20 football team then coached by Hugo Tocalli, but was not included in the final roster that traveled to Canada for the 2007 World Cup. In 2008, he was loaned to FC Francavilla in Serie D. In the 2009 winter market he was purchased by Alavés B. He was released at the end of the following season.
