= Salvatore Pincherle =

Italian mathematician (1853–1936)

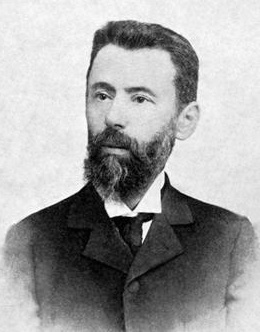
- Born: March 11, 1853 Monday; Trieste, Austrian Empire
- Died: July 10, 1936 (aged 83); Bologna, Italy
- Known for: Pincherle derivative Pincherle polynomials
- Awards: Fellow of the Royal Society of Edinburgh
- Scientific career
- Fields: Functional analysis
- Workplaces: University of Palermo; University of Bologna; Italian Mathematical Union
- Doctoral students: Carlo Severini; Ugo Amaldi

Salvatore Pincherle (March 11, 1853 – July 10, 1936) was an Italian mathematician. He contributed significantly to (and arguably helped to found) the field of functional analysis, established the Italian Mathematical Union (Italian: "Unione Matematica Italiana"), and was president of the Third International Congress of Mathematicians. The Pincherle derivative is named after him.

== Life and Works ==
Pincherle was born into a Jewish family in Trieste (then part of the Austrian Littoral) and spent his childhood in Marseille, France. After completing his basic schooling in Marseille, he left in 1869 to study mathematics at the University of Pisa, where he was a student under both Enrico Betti and Ulisse Dini. After he graduated in 1874, he taught at a school in Pavia until he received a scholarship in 1877.

After winning the scholarship and studying abroad at the University of Berlin, Pincherle met Karl Weierstrass. Pincherle contributed to Weierstrass' theory of analytic functions, and in 1880, influenced by Weierstrass, he wrote an expository paper in the Giornale di Matematiche, which proved to be a significant paper in the field of analysis. Throughout his life, Pincherle's work greatly reflected the influence that Weierstrass had on him. He later collaborated with Vito Volterra and explored Laplace transforms and other parts of functional analysis.

From 1880 until 1928, Pincherle was a Professor of Mathematics at the University of Bologna. In 1901, collaborating with Ugo Amaldi, he published his main scientific book, Le Operazioni Distributive e loro Applicazioni all'Analisi.

In Bologna in 1922, he established the Italian Mathematical Union and became its first President and held the position until 1936. In 1924, he attended the Second International Congress of Mathematicians in Toronto, Ontario, Canada. Four years later, he became President of the Third International Congress and played a significant role in re-admitting German mathematicians after a ban imposed because of World War I. At this Congress, Jacques Hadamard declared in his review lecture Le développement et le rôle scientifique du Calcul fonctionnel that Pincherle was one of the most prominent founders of functional analysis. Following the Third Congress, Pincherle retired from university.

In honor of the centenary of his birth, the Italian Mathematical Union edited a selection of 62 of his notes and treatises; they were published in 1954 in Rome.
