= Humbert surface =

Concept in algebraic geometry

In algebraic geometry, a Humbert surface, studied by Humbert (1899), is a surface in the moduli space of principally polarized abelian surfaces consisting of the surfaces with a symmetric endomorphism of some fixed discriminant.
