= Character (mathematics) =

Mathematical function

In mathematics, a character is (most commonly) a special kind of function from a group to a field (such as the complex numbers). There are at least two distinct, but overlapping meanings. Other uses of the word "character" are almost always qualified.

== Multiplicative character ==
A multiplicative character (or linear character, or simply character) on a group G is a group homomorphism from G to the multiplicative group of a field (Artin 1966), usually the field of complex numbers. If G is any group, then the set Ch(G) of these morphisms forms an abelian group under pointwise multiplication.

This group is referred to as the character group of G. Sometimes only unitary characters are considered (thus the image is in the unit circle); other such homomorphisms are then called quasi-characters. Dirichlet characters can be seen as a special case of this definition.

Multiplicative characters are linearly independent, i.e. if $\chi_1,\chi_2, \ldots , \chi_n$ are different characters on a group G to the same field then from $a_1\chi_1+a_2\chi_2 + \dots + a_n \chi_n = 0$ it follows that $a_1=a_2=\cdots=a_n=0$.

== Character of a representation ==
The character $\chi : G \to F$ of a representation $\phi \colon G\to\mathrm{GL}(V)$ of a group G on a finite-dimensional vector space V over a field F is the trace of the representation $\phi$ (Serre 1977), i.e.

$\chi_\phi(g) = \operatorname{Tr}(\phi(g))$ for $g \in G$

In general, the trace is not a group homomorphism, nor does the set of traces form a group. The characters of one-dimensional representations are identical to one-dimensional representations, so the above notion of multiplicative character can be seen as a special case of higher-dimensional characters. The study of representations using characters is called "character theory" and one-dimensional characters are also called "linear characters" within this context.

=== Alternative definition ===
If restricted to finite abelian group with $1 \times 1$ representation in $\mathbb{C}$ (i.e. $\mathrm{GL}(V) = \mathrm{GL}(1, \mathbb{C})$), the following alternative definition would be equivalent to the above (For abelian groups, every matrix representation decomposes into a direct sum of $1 \times 1$ representations. For non-abelian groups, the original definition would be more general than this one):

A character $\chi$ of group $(G, \cdot)$ is a group homomorphism $\chi: G \rightarrow \mathbb{C}^*$ i.e. $\chi (x \cdot y)=\chi (x) \chi (y)$ for all $x, y \in G.$

If $G$ is a finite abelian group, the characters play the role of harmonics. For infinite abelian groups, the above would be replaced by $\chi: G \to \mathbb{T}$ where $\mathbb{T}$ is the circle group.

== See also ==
- Character group
- Dirichlet character
- Harish-Chandra character
- Hecke character
- Infinitesimal character
- Alternating character
- Characterization (mathematics)
- Pontryagin duality
- Base (topology) § Weight and character
