= Elizabeth Brunner =

British economist

Elizabeth Brunner (1920 – 6 October 1983) was a British economist, best known for her work in industrial economics with Philip Andrews.

Brunner was partly responsible for "the resuscitation of industrial economics", giving the subject a new theoretical basis by defining an industry, as separate from a market, based on a group of firms with similar processes of production. Together with Andrews she made several contributions to business history: Capital Development in Steel (1951), The Eagle Ironworkers, Oxford (1965) and, their biography of British industrialist, The Life of Lord Nuffield (1955). Her clear style and disciplined approach contributed a lot to their joint work. In 1952 she helped create the Journal of Industrial Economics, first as editorial assistant and then assistant editor.

Brunner first studied English literature, later taking up economics as research assistant to Philip Andrews in 1944. From 1946 to 1957 she was economics tutor at St. Hugh's College, Oxford. In 1957 she helped found the economics department at University of Lancaster, serving twice as head of department. Her work with Andrews has been honoured by the annual Andrews and Brunner lecture since 2019, when the lecturer was Alvin E. Roth.
