= Michael James Farrell =

- Born: 9 May 1926; Swindon, England, UK
- Died: 27 October 1975 (aged 49); Cambridge, England, UK

Academic background
- Influences: Philip Andrews, D. G. Champernowne

Michael James Farrell (9 May 1926 – 27 October 1975) was a Cambridge economist professionally known as M. J. Farrell. Academically he is remembered largely for the celebrated parametric measure of productive efficiency that he published in 1957.

== Biography ==
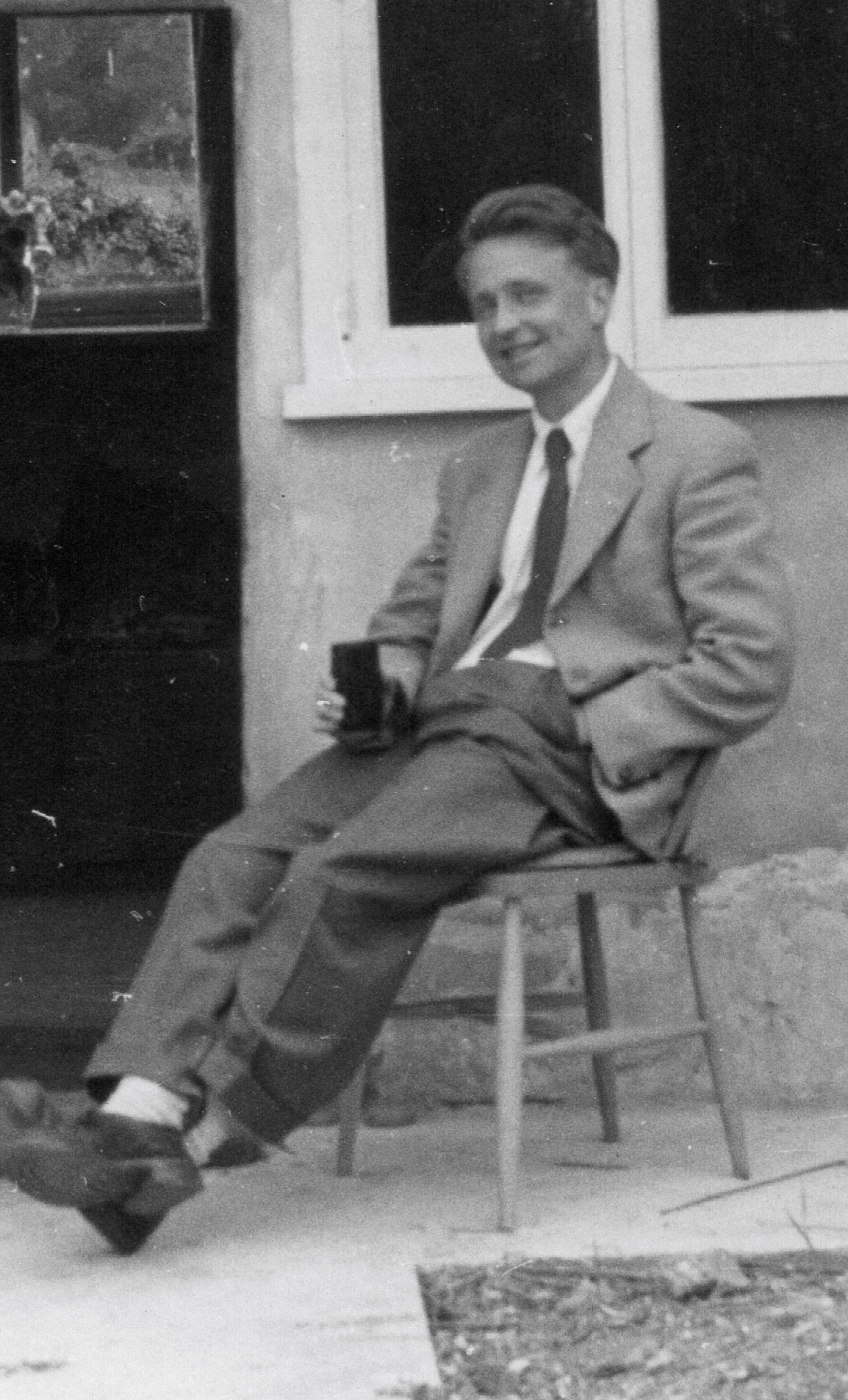
Michael Farrell at the Thatched Cottage Coton, 1954, Assistant Lecturer in Economics at Cambridge University

Mike Farrell was born in Swindon, England, in 1926. He was the son of Richard J. Farrell, OBE, an engineer for the Crown Agents for Overseas Governments and Administrations, and Margaret E. Deane. In 1934, his family moved to Sheffield, England, and in 1936 he entered King Edward VII School, Sheffield. In 1944 he won a scholarship to New College, Oxford.

He travelled to the US in 1951. While in the USA he met Margaret Bacon, later a psychologist and psychotherapist, daughter of Ernst Bacon, whom he married in 1952. He returned to Cambridge with Margaret in 1953. They had five sons.

In 1957, he contracted poliomyelitis. He spent most of a year in the hospital, never recovering fully. Being an avid tennis player and "rambler," the lasting effects of polio were severely limiting. Despite a dire initial prognosis that he would never walk again, through his determination, he eventually did walk, often unaided.

He died in Cambridge on 27 October 1975, aged 49.

== Career ==
He won an open scholarship worth £100 a year in mathematics to New College, Oxford. After his first year at Oxford, he served two years of National Service at the Statistics Division of the Board of Trade, after which he returned to Oxford and changed his studies to PPE. Upon graduating from Oxford in 1949 he moved to Cambridge to the Cambridge University department of applied economics, led by Richard Stone.

From 1951 to 1953, he was a Commonwealth Fund fellow, and spent two years with the Cowles Commission for Research in Economics, in Chicago.

He was made assistant lecturer in the faculty of economics and politics at Cambridge in 1953, lecturer in 1956, and reader in 1970. In 1958 he became a fellow of Gonville and Caius College, and he was college lecturer in economics from 1960 to 1968 and director of studies in economics and College Registrar until his death. He spent sabbatical leaves at Yale University, Carnegie Mellon University, and University of California, Berkeley, as well as at Center for Operations Research and Econometrics (CORE) in Leuven (also known as Louvain), Belgium.

In 1962 he was elected a fellow of the Econometric Society. He edited the Journal of Industrial Economics and was a joint managing editor of the Review of Economic Studies from 1965 to 1968. In 1969, applying for the post of Director of the Department of Applied Economics at Cambridge, Farrell wrote:

"My primary interest in economics has been in the quantification of economic theory and in relating it to empirical data. This has often led me to use econometric and other mathematical techniques… But my interest in making inferences from empirical evidence is in no way confined to situations where sophisticated mathematical techniques are applicable. …"

His influences included Philip Andrews, the author of Manufacturing Business, and D. G. Champernowne. He influenced notable economists, including Joseph E. Stiglitz and Richard Jolly.

In addition to The Measurement of Production Efficiency, his papers include a pamphlet "Fuller Employment?" (1965) and a theoretical discussion in Economica (1966) of the question whether destabilizing speculation can be profitable.

According to Dr Lucy Joan Slater, Farrell was the first person to use the Electronic delay storage automatic calculator (EDSAC) I and to program regression analysis. Dr. Slater reported years later "Professor Kaldor (Nicholas Kaldor) said that Mike had infected the economics faculty with numeracy!"

== Farrell efficiency ==
Leaving aside religious economic debates about whether productive inefficiency can exist, previous attempts to measure it largely fell into two classes. Labor productivity, one popular measure, is simply output divided by labor input. Clearly this raises the question of whether differences in labor productivity are explained by differences in other inputs; it also suggests that one could equally measure capital productivity, or paperclip productivity. One response to this is to fit a parameterized production function, but the results may depend sensitively on the functional form assumed. Farrell's solution was to deem an input-output vector inefficient only to the extent that it is Pareto-dominated by a convex combination of other observed input-output vectors. This amounts to approximating the feasible production set by the convex hull of observed input-output combinations.

This work (Journal of the Royal Statistical Society, 1957) has been very influential and exceptionally highly (and durably) cited. As of late 2015, Google Scholar estimates a total of over 14,300 citations for the article, 6,610 of them within the past five years.

== Sources ==
- M. R. Fisher, “The economic contributions of Michael James Farrell', Review of Economic Studies, 43/3 (Oct 1976), 371-82
- M. R. Fisher., Cambridge Review (21 Nov 1975), 47-8
- W. J. M., The Caian (1975-6), 63-5
- J. v. R. Farrell

== Bibliography ==
- Farrell, M. J., “The Measurement of Productive Efficiency.” Journal of the Royal Statistical Society, Vol. A 120 (1957), pp. 253–290.
- Farrell, M. J., "The Convexity Assumption in the Theory of Competitive Markets." Journal of Political Economy, Vol. 67, No. 4 (Aug., 1959), pp. 377–391
- Farrell, M. J., "Book Review: Demand for Automobiles in the United States: A Study in Consumer Durables Gregory C. Chow." Journal of Political Economy 67.3 (1959): 313
- Farrell, M. J., and M Fieldhouse, "Estimating efficient production functions under increasing returns to scale." Journal of the Royal Statistical Society (1962) 125 pp. 252–267
- Farrell, M. J., "Fuller employment?" London, Institute of Economic Affairs (1965) Hobart papers; no.34
- Farrell, M. J., "The Magnitude of 'Rate-of-Growth' Effects on Aggregate Savings." The Economic Journal Vol. 80, No. 320 (Dec., 1970), pp. 873–894
- Farrell, M. J., "Some Elementary Selection Processes in Economics." The Review of Economic Studies, Vol. 37, No. 3 (Jul., 1970), pp. 305–319
- Farrell, M. J., (Editor) "Readings in Welfare Economics Paperback." MacMillan, London, April, 1973
- Farrell, M. J., “Liberalism in the Theory of Social Choice,” Review of Economic Studies, 43 (1976), 3-10
