= Umberto Chiacchio =

Italian politician

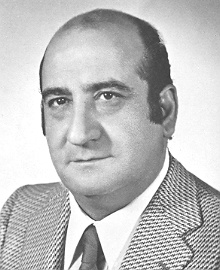

Member of the Chamber of Deputies
- In office 25 May 1972 – 4 July 1976

Personal details
- Born: Umberto Chiacchio; 8 February 1930 Grumo Nevano, Italy
- Died: 18 October 2001 (aged 71) Massa Lubrense, Italy
- Party: Italian Social Movement (1972–1995); National Alliance (1995–2001)
- Spouse: Rita Moselli
- Children: 3
- Occupation: entrepreneur

Umberto Chiacchio (8 February 1930 – 18 October 2001) was an Italian politician and entrepreneur.

== Biography ==
Born in Grumo Nevano into a noble family, he was married to Rita Moselli, and was a resident near Lake Patria.

== Career ==
He was close to Achille Lauro, and in his youth he was a member of the People's Monarchist Party. He was enrolled in the Grand Orient of Italy. During the 1972 general elections he was elected to the Chamber of Deputies in the Naples constituency, a candidate with Giorgio Almirante's Italian Social Movement until 1976. During his term as a member of parliament he was among the members of the finance and treasury commission chaired by Franco Maria Malfatti and Giuseppe La Loggia. In 1997 he was involved in the well-known Italgest scandal. His arrest was ordered, he turned himself in after a short period on the run, and ended up under house arrest. He died of illness on 18 October 2001.

== Electoral history ==
Election	House	Constituency	Party	Votes	Result
1972	Chamber of Deputies	Naples–Caserta	MSI	35.027	Elected
1976	Chamber of Deputies	Naples–Caserta	MSI	28.676	Not Elected
