= Humbert polynomials =

In mathematics, the Humbert polynomials π^{λ}_{n,m}(x) are a generalization of Pincherle polynomials introduced by Pierre Humbert given by the generating function

$$\displaystyle (1-mxt+t^m)^{-\lambda}=\sum^\infty
_{n=0}\pi^\lambda_{n,m}(x)t^n$$

== See also ==
- Umbral calculus
