= Bruce Sacerdote =

American economist

Academic background
- Education: Harvard University; Dartmouth College

Academic work
- Discipline: Child and Youth Outcomes; Education; Law and economics Causal Inference
- Institutions: Dartmouth College, Richard S. Braddock 1963 Professor in Economics
- Website: http://www.dartmouth.edu/~bsacerdo/; Information at IDEAS / RePEc

Bruce Sacerdote is an American economist and the Richard S. Braddock 1963 Professor in Economics at Dartmouth College, where he "enjoy[s] working with detailed data to enhance our understanding of why children and youth turn out the way they do. [He is] also involved in a series of studies to examine how students make choices about college going and how policy makers might influence that decision-making process."

== Background and research ==
Sacerdote's research focuses on child and youth outcomes, education, law and economics and causal inference. His research has been published in the American Economic Review, Econometrica, the Quarterly Journal of Economics, and the Journal of Political Economy. His work has been cited over 24,000 times. In addition to teaching an undergraduate seminar in finance, he is a research associate for the National Bureau of Economic Research, an affiliated professor for the Abdul Latif Jameel Poverty in Action Lab and an associate editor of the Quarterly Journal of Economics.

Sacerdote is often sought out by the media, and his opinions have been featured publications such as The New York Times, Time, and New York magazine, as well as in op-eds for The New York Times

He previously served as the chair of the Department of Economics at Dartmouth College. In 2024, Sacerdote signed a faculty letter expressing support for the actions of Dartmouth president Sian Beilock, who ordered the arrests of 90 students and faculty members nonviolently protesting the Gaza war.

== Education ==
Sacerdote graduated summa cum laude with a B.A. in economics from Dartmouth College in 1990 and was class salutatorian. He attended graduate school at Harvard University and graduated in 1997 with a Ph.D. in economics. While at Dartmouth, Sacerdote was a member of Delta Beta chapter of Sigma Nu fraternity.
