= Eliana =

- Pronunciation: /ˌɛliˈɑːnə/
- Gender: Female

Origin
- Origin: Hebrew, Latin
- Meaning: "My God has answered" (Hebrew), uncertain (Latin)

Other names
- Related names: Elian, Eliane, Éliane, Ileana, Iliana, Iljana, Ilana, Liana, Liane, Lianne, Eleana, Elyana, Eliah, Elianna, Elianah, Elliana, Ellianna, Eliena, Elienna, Elienah, Elianni, Elianny, Aliana, Elia

Eliana, Elianna, אֱלִיעָנָה (Hebrew), Eλιάνα (Greek), إليانا (Arabic), is a feminine given name found with that spelling in Hebrew, Italian, Portuguese, and Spanish.

== Origin and meaning ==
Many sources derive it from Hebrew, literally translated as "My God has answered." It is analysed as three Hebrew elements: el "god", anah "he has answered", and the yod following el, which marks first-person possession.

A separate proposed origin is the Late Latin Aeliāna, the feminine form of Aeliānus, an adjectival derivative of the Roman gens name Aelius. Teresa Norman derives this in turn from Greek ἥλιος (hēlios, "sun").

Some variants include Iliana, Ileana, and Eleana.

== Popularity ==
=== United States ===
Eliana first appeared in the Social Security Administration's top 1000 rankings in 1986 at rank 451. The name climbed steadily through the 2000s and 2010s, entering the top 50 in 2018 and the top 20 in 2024. In 2025, Eliana debuted in the top 10 at number 10, replacing Ava, with 8,191 births representing 0.466 percent of total female births that year.

The commercial parenting site BabyCenter, which compiles rankings from names submitted by its users, placed Eliana at number 7 for 2025, up from number 14 the previous year.

Rank of Eliana among female births in the United States, by year
Year	Rank
2025	10
2024	18
2023	34
2022	41
2021	47
2020	53
2019	62
2018	84
2017	88
2016	93
2015	102
2014	117
2013	125
2012	144
2011	155
2010	168
2009	193
2008	201
2007	248
2006	278
2005	304
2004	314
2003	347
2002	393
2001	493
2000	537
1999	624
1998	708
1997	782
1996	886
1994	995
1993	993
1992	917
1991	745
1987	827
1986	451

Rank 1 is the most popular. Years not listed are years in which Eliana did not rank within the top 1000. Data are drawn from Social Security card applications for births occurring in the United States.

== Notable people with the name ==
- Eliana Kalogeras a tiker
- Eliana Alexander, Mexican actress
- Eliana Benador, Swiss-American consultant
- Eliana Michaelichen Bezerra, Brazilian actress, known mononymously as Eliana
- Eliana Bórmida, Argentine architect
- Eliana Cardoso, Brazilian professor
- Eliana Chávez, Colombian sprinter
- Eliana Cuevas, Canadian musician
- Eliana Falco, Uruguayan handball player
- Eliana La Ferrara, Italian economist
- Eliana Gaete, Chilean track and field athlete
- Eliana Gil, Ecuadoran clinician
- Eliana González, Peruvian table tennis player
- Eliana Johnson, American journalist
- Eliana Jones, Canadian actress
- Eliana Krawczyk, Argentine naval officer
- Eliana García Laguna, Mexican politician
- Eliana Pintor Marin, American politician
- Eliana Mason, American goalball player
- Eliana Menassé, Mexican painter
- Eliana Navarro, Chilean poet
- Eliana Paco Paredes, Bolivian fashion designer
- Eliana Pittman, Brazilian singer and actress
- Eliana Printes, Brazilian singer and composer
- Eliana Ramos, Uruguayan fashion model
- Eliana Riggio, Italian UN official and author
- Eliana Rubashkyn, Colombian-born New Zealander LGBTI activist
- Eliana Stábile, Argentine footballer
- Eliana Tomkins, British musician
- Eliana Tranchesi, Brazilian entrepreneur
- Elyana, Malaysian singer and actress
- Elyanna, Palestinian-Chilean singer-songwriter

== Other uses ==
=== Places ===
- L'Eliana, a municipality in the province of Valencia, Spain

=== Ships ===
- SS Santa Eliana, previously the SS Mayaguez

=== Media ===
- Eliana, the romantic novel by Samuel Pordage;
- Eliana, Eliana, an Indonesian film directed by Riri Riza.
