= List of Nobel laureates affiliated with Princeton University as alumni or faculty =

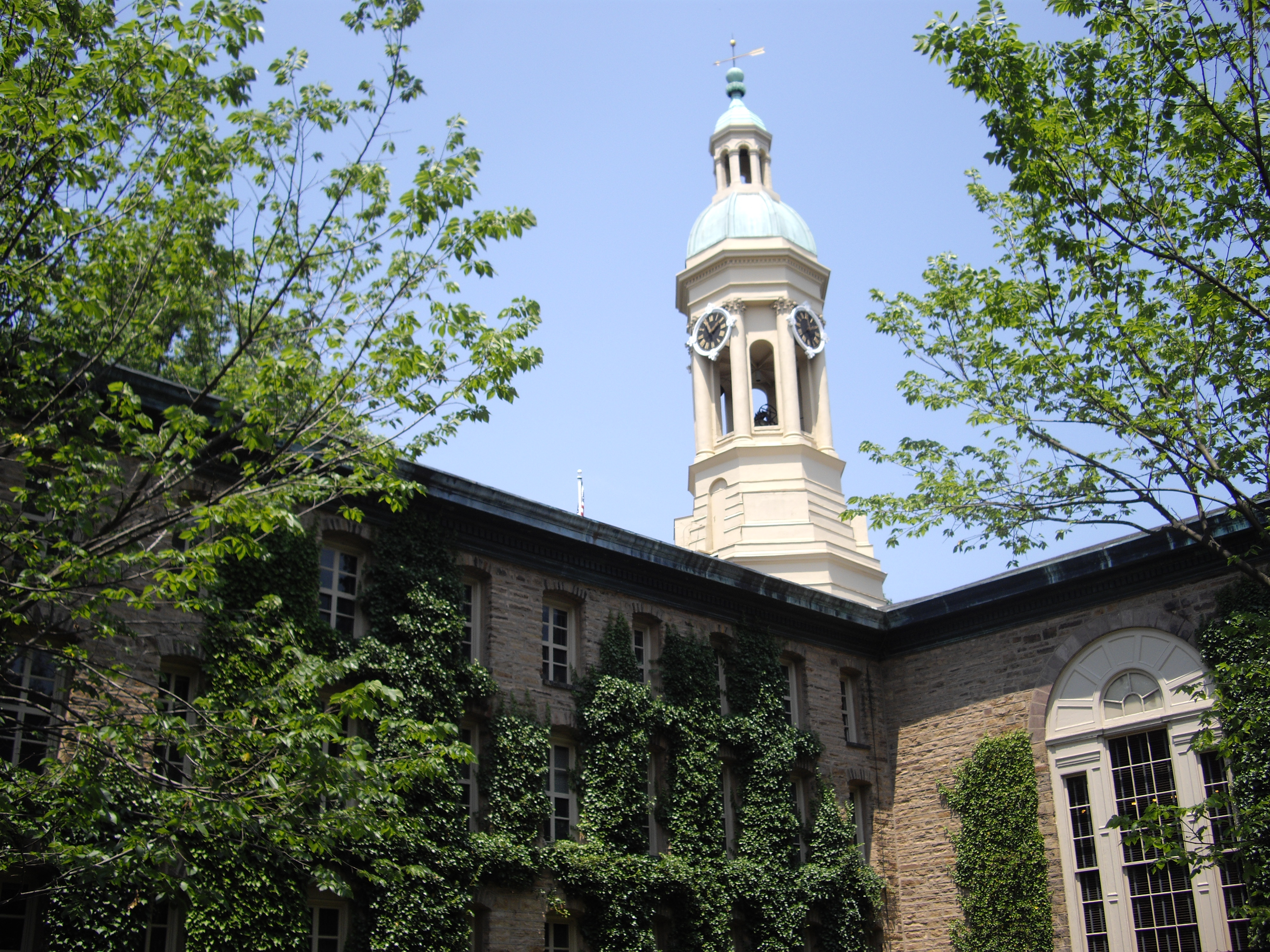
As of October 2026, 84 Nobel laureates have been affiliated with Princeton University.The building pictured is Nassau Hall.

This list of Nobel laureates affiliated with Princeton University as alumni or faculty comprehensively shows alumni (graduates and attendees) or faculty members (professors of various ranks, researchers, and visiting lecturers or professors) affiliated with Princeton University who were awarded the Nobel Prize or the Nobel Memorial Prize in Economic Sciences. People who have given public lectures, talks or non-curricular seminars; studied as non-degree students; received honorary degrees; or served as administrative staff at the university are excluded from the list. Summer school attendees and visitors are generally excluded from the list, since summer terms are not part of formal academic years.

The Nobel Prizes are awarded annually by the Royal Swedish Academy of Sciences, the Karolinska Institute, and the Norwegian Nobel Committee to individuals who make outstanding contributions in the fields of chemistry, physics, literature, peace, and physiology or medicine. They were established by the 1895 will of Alfred Nobel, which dictates that the awards should be administered by the Nobel Foundation. Another prize, the "Sveriges Riksbank Prize in Economic Sciences in Memory of Alfred Nobel" (commonly known as the Nobel Economics Prize), was established in 1968 (first awarded in 1969) by the Sveriges Riksbank, the central bank of Sweden, for contributors to the field of economics.

As of October 2026, 84 Nobel laureates have been affiliated with Princeton University as alumni or faculty. Among the 84 laureates, 47 are Nobel laureates in natural sciences; (Note: The total number of laureates in natural sciences: Physics, Chemistry, and Physiology or Medicine.) 24 are Princeton alumni (graduates and attendees) and 35 have been Princeton faculty members; and subject-wise, 31 laureates have won the Nobel Prize in Physics, more than any other subject. In 2021, Princeton scholars and alumni received an unprecedented five Nobel Prizes. (Note: For verification, see "Summary".)

Woodrow Wilson, the former president of Princeton University, was the first Princeton alumni to win the Nobel Prize, winning the Nobel Peace Prize in 1919. Five Nobel Prizes (same subject in the same year) were shared by Princeton laureates: James Cronin and Val Logsdon Fitch won the 1980 Nobel Prize in Physics; Russell Alan Hulse and Joseph Hooton Taylor, Jr. won the 1993 Nobel Prize in Physics; David Gross and Frank Wilczek won the 2004 Nobel Prize in Physics; David Card and Joshua Angrist won the 2021 Nobel Memorial Prize in Economics; and Ben Bernanke and Philip H. Dybvig won the 2022 Nobel Memorial Prize in Economics. John Bardeen received two Nobel Prizes in Physics, in 1956 and in 1972; since this is a list of laureates, not prizes, he is counted only once.

== Summary ==
All types of affiliations, namely alumni and faculty members, count equally in the following table and throughout the whole page. (Note: This is because, according to Wikipedia policies on no original research and objectivity/neutrality, it is not possible in Wikipedia to subjectively assign various weights to different types of affiliations.)

In the following list, the number following a person's name is the year they received the prize; in particular, a number with asterisk (*) means the person received the award while they were working at Princeton University (including emeritus staff). (Note: The table doesn't provide citations or details on entries; for citations and details, see "Nobel laureates by category".) A name underlined implies that this person has already been listed in a previous category (i.e., multiple affiliations).

Category	Alumni	Professors of various ranks	Researchers or visitors
Total: 84	24	35	36
Physics (31)	1. Jim Peebles – 2019; 2. Kip Thorne – 2017; 3. Frank Wilczek – 2004; 4. Steven Weinberg – 1979; 5. John Bardeen – 1956, 1972; 6. Richard Feynman – 1965; 7. Robert Hofstadter – 1961; 8. Clinton Davisson – 1937; 9. Arthur Compton – 1927	1. John Hopfield – 2024*; 2. Syukuro Manabe – 2021*; 3. Jim Peebles – 2019*; 4. Duncan Haldane – 2016*; 5. Arthur B. McDonald – 2015; 6. David Gross – 2004; 7. Daniel Tsui – 1998*; 8. Joseph H. Taylor – 1993*; 9. Russell Hulse – 1993*; 10. James Cronin – 1980; 11. Val Fitch – 1980*; 12. Philip W. Anderson – 1977; 13. Eugene Wigner – 1963*; 14. Robert Hofstadter – 1961; 15. Wolfgang Pauli – 1945*; 16. Owen Richardson – 1928	1. Roger Penrose – 2020; 2. Donna Strickland – 2018; 3. Kip Thorne – 2017; 4. Rainer Weiss – 2017; 5. John M. Kosterlitz – 2016; 6. Riccardo Giacconi – 2002; 7. Arno Penzias – 1978; 8. John van Vleck – 1977; 9. Eugene Wigner – 1963; 10. Robert Hofstadter – 1961; 11. William Shockley – 1956
Chemistry (11)	1. Frances Arnold – 2018; 2. Richard Smalley – 1996; 3. Edwin McMillan – 1951	1. David MacMillan – 2021*; 2. John B. Fenn – 2002	1. Tomas Lindahl – 2015; 2. Osamu Shimomura – 2008; 3. Frank Rowland – 1995; 4. John Polanyi – 1986; 5. Willard Libby – 1960; 6. Arne Tiselius – 1948
Physiology or Medicine (5)	1. Mary E. Brunkow - 2025	1. James Rothman – 2013; 2. Eric Wieschaus – 1995*	1. Salvador Luria – 1969; 2. Edward C. Kendall – 1950
Economics (28)	1. David Card – 2021; 2. Joshua Angrist – 2021; 3. Oliver S. Hart – 2016; 4. Lloyd Shapley – 2012; 5. Michael Spence – 2001; 6. James Heckman – 2000; 7. John F. Nash – 1994; 8. Gary Becker – 1992	1. Michael Woodford – 2026; 2. Ben Bernanke – 2022; 3. Philip Dybvig – 2022; 4. David Card – 2021; 5. Abhijit Banerjee – 2019; 6. Angus Deaton – 2015*; 7. Christopher Sims – 2011*; 8. Paul Krugman – 2008*; 9. Daniel Kahneman – 2002*; 10. Joseph Stiglitz – 2001; 11. John F. Nash – 1994*; 12. W. A. Lewis – 1979*	1. Esther Duflo – 2019; 2. Angus Deaton – 2015; 3. Jean Tirole – 2014; 4. Lloyd Shapley – 2012; 5. Thomas Sargent – 2011; 6. Chris Pissarides – 2010; 7. Eric Maskin – 2007; 8. Robert Aumann – 2005; 9. Clive Granger – 2003; 10. Lawrence Klein – 1980; 11. Herbert A. Simon – 1978; 12. Tjalling Koopmans – 1975
Literature (7)	1. Eugene O'Neill – 1936	1. Anne Carson – 2026; 2. Toni Morrison – 1993*	1. Mario Vargas Llosa – 2010; 2. Kenzaburō Ōe – 1994; 3. Saul Bellow – 1976; 4. Thomas Mann – 1929
Peace (2)	1. Maria Ressa – 2021; 2. Woodrow Wilson – 1919	1. Woodrow Wilson – 1919	1. Maria Ressa – 2021

== Nobel laureates by category ==
=== Nobel laureates in Physics ===
No.	Laureate	Year	Image	Affiliation	Rationale
31	John Hopfield	2024		Hopfield has been on the faculty since 1964	“for foundational discoveries and inventions that enable machine learning with artificial neural networks” (shared with Geoffrey Hinton)
30	Syukuro Manabe	2021		Senior Meteorologist; Manabe has been on the faculty since 1968	"for the physical modeling of Earth’s climate, quantifying variability and reliably predicting global warming.” (shared with Klaus Hasselmann and Giorgio Parisi)
29	Roger Penrose	2020		Research Fellow (1959); Visiting Researcher (1960s)	"for the discovery that black hole formation is a robust prediction of the general theory of relativity." (shared with Reinhard Genzel and Andrea Ghez)
28	Jim Peebles	2019		Ph.D. (1962); Albert Einstein Professor of Science, Emeritus; Peebles has been on the faculty since 1962	"for theoretical discoveries in physical cosmology." (shared with Michel Mayor and Didier Queloz)
27	Donna Strickland	2018		Researcher, Advanced Technology Center for Photonics and Opto-electronic Materials (1992–1997)	"for their method of generating high-intensity, ultra-short optical pulses." (shared with Gérard Mourou and Arthur Ashkin)
26	Kip Thorne	2017		M.A. in physics (1963) and Ph.D. in physics (1965); Postdoctoral Researcher (1965–1966)	"for decisive contributions to the LIGO detector and the observation of gravitational waves" (shared with Rainer Weiss and Barry C. Barish)
25	Rainer Weiss	2017		Research Associate in Physics (1962–1964)	"for decisive contributions to the LIGO detector and the observation of gravitational waves." (shared with Kip Thorne and Barry C. Barish)
24	Duncan Haldane	2016		Eugene Higgins Professor of Physics (1990–Present)	"for theoretical discoveries of topological phase transitions and topological phases of matter" (shared with David Thouless and J. Michael Kosterlitz)
23	John M. Kosterlitz	2016		Visiting Professor (1978)	"for theoretical discoveries of topological phase transitions and topological phases of matter." (shared with David Thouless and Duncan Haldane)
22	Arthur B. McDonald	2015		Professor of Physics (1982–1989)	"for the discovery of neutrino oscillations, which shows that neutrinos have mass" (shared with Takaaki Kajita)
21	David Gross	2004		Assistant Professor to Associate Professor (1969–1986), and Eugene Higgins Professor of Physics (1986–1996)	"for the discovery of asymptotic freedom in the theory of the strong interaction" (shared with H. David Politzer and Frank Wilczek)
20	Frank Wilczek	2004		M.A. in mathematics (1972) and Ph.D. in physics (1975)	"for the discovery of asymptotic freedom in the theory of the strong interaction" (shared with David Gross and H. David Politzer)
19	Riccardo Giacconi	2002		Research Associate, Cosmic Ray Laboratory (1958–1959)	"for pioneering contributions to astrophysics, which have led to the discovery of cosmic X-ray sources." (shared with Masatoshi Koshiba and Raymond Davis Jr.)
18	Daniel Chee Tsui	1998		Arthur Legrand Doty Professor of Electrical Engineering (1982–Present)	"for their discovery of a new form of quantum fluid with fractionally charged excitations" (shared with Robert B. Laughlin and Horst Ludwig Störmer)
17	Joseph Hooton Taylor, Jr.	1993		Professor of Physics (1980–1986), James S. McDonnell Distinguished University Professor of Physics (1986–2006), Dean of Faculty (2000–2006), and James S. McDonnell Distinguished University Professor of Physics Emeritus (2006–Present)	"for the discovery of a new type of pulsar, a discovery that has opened up new possibilities for the study of gravitation" (shared with Russell Alan Hulse)
16	Russell Alan Hulse	1993		Principal Research Physicist, Princeton Plasma Physics Laboratory (1977–2007)	"for the discovery of a new type of pulsar, a discovery that has opened up new possibilities for the study of gravitation" (shared with Joseph Hooton Taylor, Jr.)
15	James Cronin	1980		Assistant Professor of Physics (1958–1962), Associate Professor of Physics (1962–1964), and Professor of Physics (1964–1971)	"for the discovery of violations of fundamental symmetry principles in the decay of neutral K-mesons" (shared with Val Logsdon Fitch)
14	Val Logsdon Fitch	1980		Instructor to Professor of Physics (1954–1960), Cyrus Fogg Brackett Professor (1976–1983), Chair of the Department of Physics (1976–1981), James S. McDonnell Distinguished University Professor of Physics (1983–2005), and James S. McDonnell Distinguished University Professor Emeritus of Physics (2005–2015)	"for the discovery of violations of fundamental symmetry principles in the decay of neutral K-mesons" (shared with James Cronin)
13	Steven Weinberg	1979		Ph.D. (1957)	"for their contributions to the theory of the unified weak and electromagnetic interaction between elementary particles, including, inter alia, the prediction of the weak neutral current" (shared with Sheldon Glashow and Abdus Salam)
12	Arno Allan Penzias	1978		Lecturer in Astrophysical Science (1967–1972), and Visiting Professor of Astrophysical Science (1972–1985)	"for their discovery of cosmic microwave background radiation" (shared with Pyotr Kapitsa and Robert Woodrow Wilson)
11	Philip Warren Anderson	1977		Joseph Henry Professor of Physics (1975–1997), and Emeritus Professor of Physics (1997–2020)	"for their fundamental theoretical investigations of the electronic structure of magnetic and disordered systems" (shared with Nevill Francis Mott and John Hasbrouck Van Vleck)
10	John van Vleck	1977		Visiting Professor, Department of Physics (1937), taught a course for a semester	"for their fundamental theoretical investigations of the electronic structure of magnetic and disordered systems." (shared with Nevill Francis Mott and Philip Warren Anderson)
	John Bardeen*	1972		Ph.D. (1936) (*Another Physics prize in 1956)	"for their jointly developed theory of superconductivity, usually called the BCS-theory" (shared with Leon Cooper and John Robert Schrieffer)
9	Richard Feynman	1965		Ph.D. (1942)	"for their fundamental work in quantum electrodynamics, with deep-ploughing consequences for the physics of elementary particles" (shared with Sin-Itiro Tomonaga and Julian Schwinger)
8	Eugene Wigner	1963		Half-time Research Professor (1931–1934), Visiting Professor (1934–1936), Thomas D. Jones Professor of Mathematical Physics (1938–1971), and Thomas D. Jones Emeritus Professor of Mathematical Physics (1971–1995)	"for his contributions to the theory of the atomic nucleus and the elementary particles, particularly through the discovery and application of fundamental symmetry principles"(shared with Maria Goeppert Mayer and J. Hans D. Jensen)
7	Robert Hofstadter	1961		M.A. and Ph.D. (1938); Procter Fellow (1938–1939), and Assistant Professor of Physics (1946–1950)	"for his pioneering studies of electron scattering in atomic nuclei and for his thereby achieved discoveries concerning the structure of the nucleons" (shared with Rudolf Mössbauer)
6	John Bardeen*	1956		Ph.D. (1936) (*Another Physics prize in 1972)	"for their researches on semiconductors and their discovery of the transistor effect" (shared with William Shockley and Walter Houser Brattain)
5	William Shockley	1956		Lecturer (1946)	"for their researches on semiconductors and their discovery of the transistor effect." (shared with John Bardeen and Walter Houser Brattain)
4	Wolfgang Pauli	1945		Chair of Theoretical Physics (1940–1945)	"For the discovery of the Exclusion Principle, also called the Pauli Principle."
3	Clinton Davisson	1937		Ph.D. (1911)	"for their experimental discovery of the diffraction of electrons by crystals" (shared with George Paget Thomson)
2	Owen Richardson	1928		Professor of Physics (1906–1913)	"for his work on the thermionic phenomenon and especially for the discovery of the law named after him."
1	Arthur Compton	1927		M.A. and Ph.D (1916)	"for his discovery of the effect named after him" (shared with Charles Thomson Rees Wilson)

=== Nobel laureates in Chemistry ===
No.	Laureate	Year	Image	Affiliation	Rationale
11	David MacMillan	2021		Joined the faculty in 2006; James S. McDonnell Distinguished University Professor of Chemistry (2011–Present)	"for the development of asymmetric organocatalysis" (shared with Benjamin List)
10	Frances Arnold	2018		B.S. in Mechanical and Aerospace Engineering (1979)	"for the directed evolution of enzymes" (shared with George P. Smith and Gregory P. Winter)
9	Tomas Lindahl	2015		Postdoctoral researcher (1960s)	"for mechanistic studies of DNA repair" (shared with Paul L. Modrich and Aziz Sancar)
8	Osamu Shimomura	2008		Researcher, Department of Biology (1960–1982)	"for the discovery and development of the green fluorescent protein, GFP" (shared with Martin Chalfie and Roger Tsien)
7	John B. Fenn	2002		Professor of Mechanical Engineering (1959–1963), and Professor of Aerospace Sciences (1963–1966).	"for their development of soft desorption ionisation methods for mass spectrometric analyses of biological macromolecules." (shared with Koichi Tanaka and Kurt Wüthrich)
6	Richard Smalley	1996		Ph.D. (1974)	"for their discovery of fullerenes" (shared with Robert Curl and Harold Kroto)
5	F. Sherwood Rowland	1995		Instructor, Department of Chemistry (1952–1956)	"for their work in atmospheric chemistry, particularly concerning the formation and decomposition of ozone." (shared with Mario J. Molina and Paul J. Crutzen)
4	John Polanyi	1986		Research Associate (1954–1956)	"for their contributions concerning the dynamics of chemical elementary processes." (shared with Yuan T. Lee and Dudley R. Herschbach)
3	Willard Libby	1960		Guggenheim Memorial Foundation Fellow (Fall 1941)	"for his method to use carbon-14 for age determination in archaeology, geology, geophysics, and other branches of science."
2	Edwin McMillan	1951		Ph.D. (1933)	"for their discoveries in the chemistry of transuranium elements" (shared with Glenn T. Seaborg)
1	Arne Tiselius	1948		Rockefeller Fellow at H.S. Taylor's laboratory (1936)	"for his research on electrophoresis and adsorption analysis, especially for his discoveries concerning the complex nature of the serum proteins."

=== Nobel laureates in Physiology or Medicine ===
No.	Laureate	Year	Image	Affiliation	Rationale
5	Mary E. Brunkow	2025		Ph.D. (1991)	"for their discoveries concerning peripheral immune tolerance" (shared with Fred Ramsdell and Shimon Sakaguchi)
4	James Rothman	2013		E.R. Squibb Professor of Molecular Biology (1988–1991)	"for their discoveries of machinery regulating vesicle traffic, a major transport system in our cells" (shared with Randy Schekman and Thomas C. Südhof)
3	Eric F. Wieschaus	1995		Professor (1981–Present)	"for their discoveries concerning the genetic control of early embryonic development" (shared with Edward B. Lewis and Christiane Nüsslein-Volhard)
2	Salvador Luria	1969		Guggenheim Fellow (1943)	"for their discoveries concerning the replication mechanism and the genetic structure of viruses." (shared with Max Delbrück and Alfred Hershey)
1	Edward C. Kendall	1950		Visiting Professor of Chemistry (1951–1972)	"for their discoveries relating to the hormones of the adrenal cortex, their structure and biological effects." (shared with Philip Showalter Hench and Tadeusz Reichstein)

=== Nobel Memorial Prize laureates in Economics ===
No.	Laureate	Year	Image	Affiliation	Rationale
28	Michael Woodford	2026		Professor (1995–1998), Harold H. Helm ’20 Professor of Economics and Banking (1998–2004)	"for microeconomic foundations of macroeconomic stabilisation." (shared with Robert Hall)
27	Ben Bernanke	2022		Professor of Economics (1985–2002)	"for research on banks and financial crises." (shared with Douglas Diamond and Philip Dybvig)
26	Philip Dybvig	2022		Assistant Professor of Economics (1980–1981)	"for research on banks and financial crises." (shared with Ben Bernanke and Douglas Diamond)
25	David Card	2021		Ph.D. (1983); Professor of Economics (1983–1997)	"for his empirical contributions to labor economics." (shared with Joshua Angrist and Guido Imbens)
24	Joshua Angrist	2021		Ph.D. (1989)	"for their methodological contributions to the analysis of causal relationships." (shared with David Card and Guido Imbens)
23	Esther Duflo	2019		Visitor (2001–2002)	"for their experimental approach to alleviating global poverty." (shared with Michael Kremer and Abhijit Banerjee)
22	Abhijit Banerjee	2019		Assistant Professor (1988–1992)	"for their experimental approach to alleviating global poverty." (shared with Michael Kremer and Esther Duflo)
21	Oliver Hart	2016		Ph.D. (1974)	"for their contributions to contract theory" (shared with Bengt R. Holmström)
20	Angus Deaton	2015		Dwight D. Eisenhower Professor of Economics and International Affairs (1983–Present)	"for his analysis of consumption, poverty, and welfare"
19	Jean Tirole	2014		Visiting Scholar (Spring 2002)	"for his analysis of market power and regulation."
18	Lloyd Shapley	2012		Ph.D. (1953); Fine Instructor (1952–1954)	"for the theory of stable allocations and the practice of market design" (shared with Alvin E. Roth)
17	Christopher Sims	2011		Professor of Economics (1999–Present)	"for their empirical research on cause and effect in the macroeconomy" (shared with Thomas Sargent)
16	Thomas Sargent	2011		Visiting professor of economics (2010 and Fall 2011); taught several courses	"for their empirical research on cause and effect in the macroeconomy" (shared with Christopher Sims)
15	Chris Pissarides	2010		Visitor, Industrial Relations Section (1984)	"for their analysis of markets with search frictions." (shared with Peter Diamond and Dale T. Mortensen)
14	Paul Krugman	2008		Professor of Economics and International Affairs (since 2000)	"for his analysis of trade patterns and location of economic activity."
13	Eric Maskin	2007		Visiting Lecturer in Economics (2000–2012)	"for having laid the foundations of mechanism design theory." (shared with Leonid Hurwicz and Roger Myerson)
12	Robert Aumann	2005		Research Associate (1960–1961)	"for having enhanced our understanding of conflict and cooperation through game-theory analysis." (shared with Thomas Schelling)
11	Clive Granger	2003		Harkness Fellow (1959–1960)	"for methods of analyzing economic time series with common trends (cointegration)." (shared with Robert F. Engle)
10	Daniel Kahneman	2002		Eugene Higgins Professor of Psychology and professor of public affairs (1993–)	"for having integrated insights from psychological research into economic science, especially concerning human judgment and decision-making under uncertainty." (shared with Vernon L. Smith)
9	Michael Spence	2001		B.A. in philosophy	"for their analyses of markets with asymmetric information." (shared with George Akerlof and Joseph Stiglitz)
8	Joseph Stiglitz	2001		Professor of Economics (1979–1988)	"for their analyses of markets with asymmetric information." (shared with George Akerlof and Michael Spence)
7	James Heckman	2000		M.A. (1968) and Ph.D. (1971)	"for his development of theory and methods for analyzing selective samples." (shared with Daniel McFadden)
6	John Forbes Nash	1994		Ph.D. (1950); Senior research mathematician	"for their pioneering analysis of equilibria in the theory of non-cooperative games." (shared with John Harsanyi and Reinhard Selten)
5	Gary Becker	1992		B.A. (1951)	"for having extended the domain of microeconomic analysis to a wide range of human behaviour and interaction, including non-market behaviour."
4	Lawrence Klein	1980		Visiting Professor (Spring 1966)	"for the creation of econometric models and the application to the analysis of economic fluctuations and economic policies."
3	W. Arthur Lewis	1979		Lewis was on the faculty from 1963 to 1983; he was appointed professor of economics and international affairs, and later became James Madison Professor of Political Economy	"for their pioneering research into economic development research with particular consideration of the problems of developing countries." (shared with Theodore Schultz)
2	Herbert A. Simon	1978		Visiting Fellow, Council of Humanities (1981–1982)	"for his pioneering research into the decision-making process within economic organizations."
1	Tjalling Koopmans	1975		Research Associate (1940–1941)	"for their contributions to the theory of optimum allocation of resources." (shared with Leonid Kantorovich)

=== Nobel laureates in Literature ===
No.	Laureate	Year	Image	Affiliation	Rationale
7	Anne Carson	2026		Assistant Professor (1980-1987)	"for her bold and inventive oeuvre that, in playful dialogue with the classical tradition, has created new forms for contemporary literature".
6	Mario Vargas Llosa	2010		Distinguished Visitor, Program in Latin American Studies (Fall 2010); Llosa was on the faculty in 1992, and was associated with the Program in Latin American Studies for several years	"for his cartography of structures of power and his trenchant images of the individual's resistance, revolt, and defeat"
5	Kenzaburō Ōe	1994		Visiting Lecturer (1997)	"who with poetic force creates an imagined world, where life and myth condense to form a disconcerting picture of the human predicament today."
4	Toni Morrison	1993		Robert F. Goheen Professor in the Humanities (1989–2019)	"who in novels characterized by visionary force and poetic import, gives life to an essential aspect of American reality"
3	Saul Bellow	1976		Creative Writing Fellow (1952–1953)	"for the human understanding and subtle analysis of contemporary culture that are combined in his work."
2	Eugene O'Neill	1936		Undergraduate attendee (1906–1907)	"for the power, honesty and deep-felt emotions of his dramatic works, which embody an original concept of tragedy"
1	Thomas Mann	1929		Lecturer in Humanities (1938–1940); D.Litt. honoris causa (1939)	"principally for his great novel, Buddenbrooks, which has won steadily increased recognition as one of the classic works of contemporary literature"

=== Nobel Peace Prize laureates ===
No.	Laureate	Year	Image	Affiliation	Rationale
2	Maria Ressa	2021		B.A. in English and a certificate in theater and dance (1986), Ferris Professor in Humanities Council’s Program in Journalism (2000–2001)	"for their efforts to safeguard freedom of expression, which is a precondition for democracy and lasting peace." (shared with Dmitry Muratov)
1	Woodrow Wilson	1919		B.A. (1879); Wilson was a professor of jurisprudence and political economy, and was president of Princeton University from 1902 to 1910	28th President of the United States; "for his role as founder of the League of Nations."

== See also ==
- List of Princeton University people
- List of Nobel laureates by university affiliation
