= Diamond–Dybvig model =

Theoretical description of bank runs and financial crises

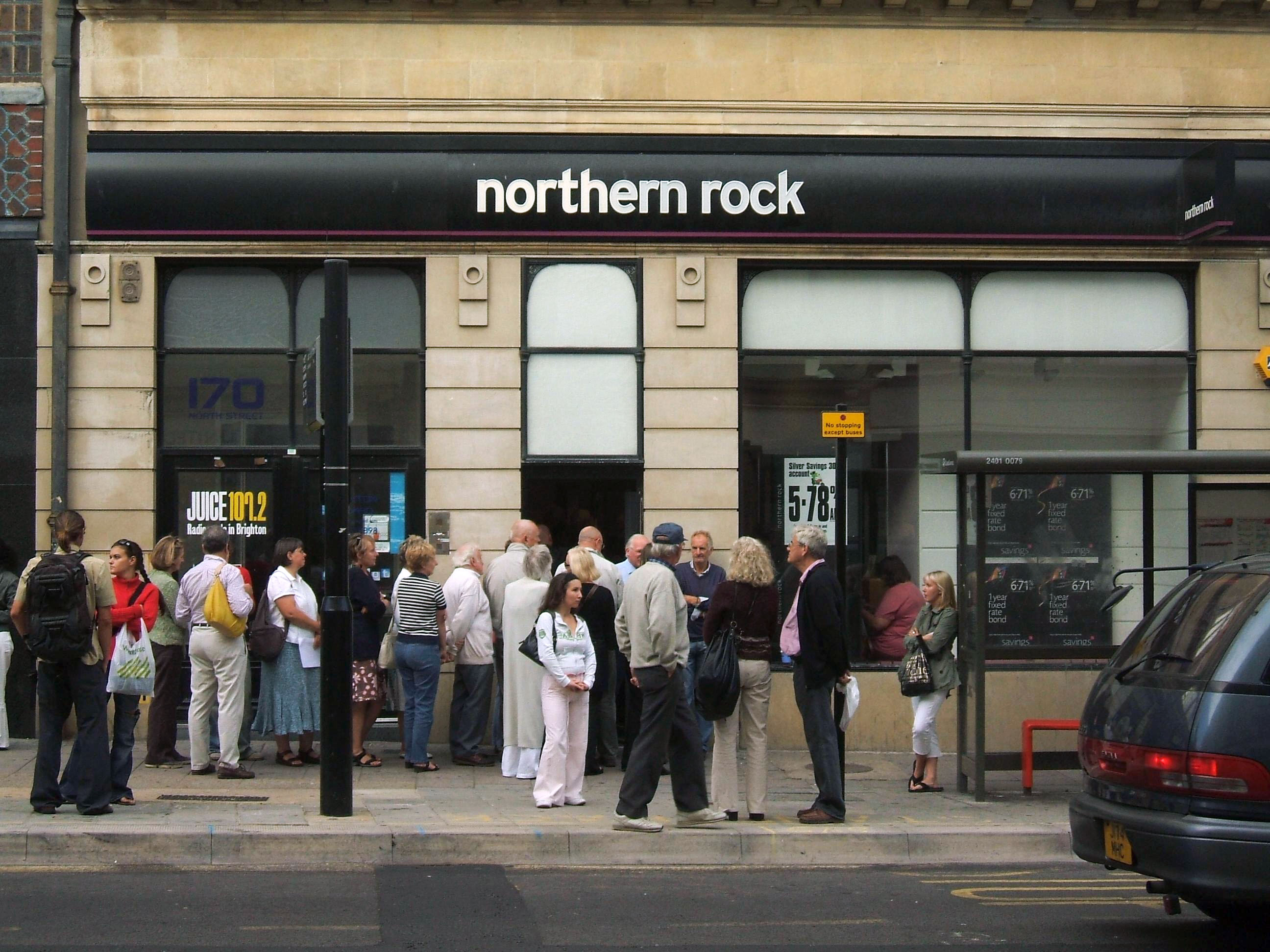
A 2007 run on Northern Rock, a British bank

The Diamond–Dybvig model is an influential model of bank runs and related financial crises. The model shows how banks' mix of illiquid assets (such as business or mortgage loans) and liquid liabilities (deposits which may be withdrawn at any time) may give rise to self-fulfilling panics among depositors. Douglas Diamond and Philip H. Dybvig, along with Ben Bernanke, were the recipients of the 2022 Nobel Prize in Economics for their work on the Diamond-Dybvig model.

== Theory ==
The model was published in the 1983 paper "Bank Runs, Deposit Insurance, and Liquidity" by Douglas W. Diamond of the University of Chicago and Philip H. Dybvig, then of Yale University. It shows how an institution with long-maturity assets and short-maturity liabilities can be unstable. A similar basic concept had formed part of the nineteenth century British Banking School theory of financial crises.

=== Structure of the model ===
Diamond and Dybvig's paper points out that business investment often requires expenditures in the present to obtain returns in the future. Therefore, they prefer loans with a long maturity (that is, low liquidity). The same principle applies to individuals seeking financing to purchase large-ticket items such as housing or automobiles. On the other hand, individual savers (both households and firms) may have sudden, unpredictable needs for cash, due to unforeseen expenditures. So they demand liquid accounts which permit them immediate access to their deposits (that is, they value short maturity deposit accounts).

The banks in the model act as intermediaries between savers who prefer to deposit in liquid accounts and borrowers who prefer to take out long-maturity loans. Under ordinary circumstances, banks can provide a valuable service by channeling funds from many individual deposits into loans for borrowers. Individual depositors might not be able to make these loans themselves, since they know they may suddenly need immediate access to their funds, whereas the businesses' investments will only pay off in the future (moreover, by aggregating funds from many different depositors, banks help depositors save on the transaction costs they would have to pay in order to lend directly to businesses). Since banks provide a valuable service to both sides (providing the long-maturity loans businesses want and the liquid accounts depositors want), they can charge a higher interest rate on loans than they pay on deposits and thus profit from the difference.

=== Nash equilibria of the model ===
Diamond and Dybvig point out that under ordinary circumstances, savers' unpredictable needs for cash are likely to be random, as depositors' needs reflect their individual circumstances. Since depositors' demand for cash are unlikely to occur at the same time, by accepting deposits from many different sources the bank expects only a small fraction of withdrawals in the short term, even though all depositors have the right to withdraw their full deposit at any time. Thus, a bank can make loans over a long horizon, while keeping only relatively small amounts of cash on hand to pay any depositors that wish to make withdrawals.

However a different outcome is also possible. Since banks lend out at long maturity, they cannot quickly call in their loans. And even if they tried to call in their loans, borrowers would be unable to pay back quickly, since their loans were, by assumption, used to finance long-term investments. Therefore, if all depositors attempt to withdraw their funds simultaneously, a bank will run out of money long before it is able to pay all the depositors. The bank will be able to pay the first depositors who demand their money back, but if all others attempt to withdraw too, the bank will go bankrupt and the last depositors will be left with nothing.

This means that even healthy banks are potentially vulnerable to panics, usually called bank runs. If a depositor expects all other depositors to withdraw their funds, then it is irrelevant whether the banks' long term loans are likely to be profitable; the only rational response for the depositor is to rush to take his or her deposits out before the other depositors remove theirs. In other words, the Diamond–Dybvig model views bank runs as a type of self-fulfilling prophecy: each depositor's incentive to withdraw funds depends on what they expect other depositors to do. If enough depositors expect other depositors to withdraw their funds, then they all have an incentive to rush to be the first in line to withdraw their funds.

== Policy implications ==
In practice, due to fractional reserve banking, banks faced with a bank run usually shut down and refuse to permit more withdrawals. However, Diamond and Dybvig argue that unless the total amount of real expenditure needs per period is known with certainty, suspension of convertibility cannot be the optimal mechanism for preventing bank runs. Instead, they argue that a better way of preventing bank runs is deposit insurance backed by the government or central bank. Such insurance pays depositors all or part of their losses in the case of a bank run. If depositors know that they will get their money back even in case of a bank run, they have no reason to participate in a bank run.

Thus, sufficient deposit insurance can eliminate the possibility of bank runs. In principle, maintaining a deposit insurance program is unlikely to be very costly for the government: as long as bank runs are prevented, deposit insurance will never actually need to be paid out. However an IMF working paper has questioned the effectiveness of deposit insurance in a crisis.

=== Case from US economic history ===
Bank runs became much rarer in the U.S. after the Federal Deposit Insurance Corporation was founded in the aftermath of the bank panics of the Great Depression. On the other hand, a deposit insurance scheme is likely to lead to moral hazard: by protecting depositors against bank failure, it makes depositors less careful in choosing where to deposit their money, and thus gives banks less incentive to lend carefully.

== See also ==
- Asset–liability mismatch
- Coordination game
- Liquidity preference
- Money demand
- Sunspot equilibrium
