= Bernanke doctrine =

The Bernanke doctrine refers to measures, identified by Ben Bernanke while Chairman of the Board of Governors of the United States Federal Reserve, that the Federal Reserve can use in conducting monetary policy to combat deflation.

== Background ==
In 2002, when the word "deflation" began appearing in the business news, Bernanke, then a governor on the Board of the Federal Reserve, gave a speech about deflation entitled "Deflation: Making Sure 'It' Doesn't Happen Here." In that speech, he assessed the causes and effects of deflation in the modern economy. Bernanke states:

"The sources of deflation are not a mystery. Deflation is in almost all cases a side effect of a collapse of aggregate demand – a drop in spending so severe that producers must cut prices on an ongoing basis in order to find buyers. Likewise, the economic effects of a deflationary episode, for the most part, are similar to those of any other sharp decline in aggregate spending—namely, recession, rising unemployment, and financial stress."

== Bernanke doctrine ==
Bernanke emphasized that Congress gave the Fed responsibility for preserving price stability (among other objectives), which implies avoiding deflation as well as inflation. He stated that deflation is always reversible under a fiat money system. Where currency is under a monopoly of issuance, or where there is a regulated system of issuing currency through banks which are tied to a central bank, the monetary authority has the ability to alter the money supply and thus influence the interest rate (to achieve monetary policy goals). Bernanke asserted that the Fed "has sufficient policy instruments to ensure that any deflation that might occur would be both mild and brief".

To combat deflation, Bernanke provided a prescription for the Federal Reserve to prevent it. He identified seven specific measures that the Fed can use to prevent deflation.

1) Increase the money supply (M1 and M2).

"The US government has a technology, called a printing press, that allows it to produce as many dollars as it wishes at essentially no cost." "Under a paper-money system, a determined government can always generate higher spending and, hence, positive inflation."

2) Ensure liquidity makes its way into the financial system through a variety of measures.

"The U.S. government is not going to print money and distribute it willy-nilly ..."although there are policies that approximate this behavior."

3) Lower interest rates – all the way down to 0 per cent.

Bernanke observed that people have traditionally thought that, when the funds rate hits zero, the Federal Reserve will have run out of ammunition. However, by imposing yields paid by long-term Treasury Bonds,

"a central bank should always be able to generate inflation, even when the short-term nominal interest rate is zero ...[this] more direct method, which I personally prefer, would be for the Fed to announce ceilings for yields on all longer-maturity Treasury debt."

He noted that Fed had successfully engaged in "bond-price pegging" following the Second World War.

4) Control the yield on corporate bonds and other privately issued securities. Although the Federal Reserve cannot legally buy these securities (thereby determining the yields), it can simulate the necessary authority by lending dollars to banks at a fixed term of 0 per cent, taking back from the banks corporate bonds as collateral.

5) Depreciate the U.S. dollar. Referring to U.S. monetary policy in the 1930s under Franklin Roosevelt, he states that:

"This devaluation and the rapid increase in money supply ... ended the U.S. deflation remarkably quickly."

6) Execute a de facto depreciation by buying foreign currencies on a massive scale.

"The Fed has the authority to buy foreign government debt ... [t]his class of assets offers huge scope for Fed operations because the quantity of foreign assets eligible for purchase by the Fed is several times the stock of U.S. government debt."

7) Buy industries throughout the U.S. economy with "newly created money". In essence, the Federal Reserve acquires equity stakes in banks and financial institutions. In this "private-asset option," the Treasury could issue trillions in debt and the Fed would acquire it, still using newly created money.
