= Andrew Abel =

American economist (born 1952)

Andrew B. Abel
- Born: December 3, 1952 (age 73)
- Education: Princeton University (BA); Massachusetts Institute of Technology (PhD)
- Occupation: Economist
- Known for: Financial economics
- Scientific career
- Workplaces: University of Pennsylvania; Wharton School; Harvard University; University of Chicago
- Doctoral advisor: Rudi Dornbusch
- Doctoral students: Andrew Lo
- Website: finance.wharton.upenn.edu/~abel/

Andrew Bruce Abel (born December 3, 1952) is an American economist who has served as a professor of economics at the University of Pennsylvania since 1987, and as the Ronald A. Rosenfeld Professor at the Wharton School since 2003.

== Biography ==
Born in 1952, Abel received an AB (summa cum laude) in economics from Princeton University in 1974, and a PhD in economics from the Massachusetts Institute of Technology in 1978, where his doctoral adviser was Rudi Dornbusch. He was an assistant professor at the University of Chicago from 1978 to 1980, and then an assistant professor at Harvard University from 1980 to 1983, where he was the John L. Loeb Associate Professor of the Social Sciences from 1983 to 1986. In 1986, he left Harvard for the Wharton School at the University of Pennsylvania, where he has been a professor of economics since 1987, and was appointed the Ronald A. Rosenfeld Professor within the Department of Finance in 2003. Abel has held visiting positions at several universities, including UCLA, Chicago Booth, Tel Aviv University, and the Hebrew University of Jerusalem.

Abel has been a research associate at the NBER since 1983, and was elected a Fellow of the Econometric Society in 1991. He served on the Congressional Budget Office’s Panel of Economic Advisors from 2001 to 2005. With Ben Bernanke (and, in later editions, Dean Croushore), he co-authored a widely used macroeconomics textbook.

== Honors, fellowships and grants ==
- Phi Beta Kappa (1974)
- National Science Foundation Graduate Fellowship (1974–77)
- Research Fellowship, Federal Reserve Bank of Boston (1977–78)
- Grant from U.S. Department of Energy (1981–82)
- Grants from National Science Foundation (1982–91, 1993–1996)
- John Kenneth Galbraith Award for Excellence in Teaching (1984)
- Sloan Research Fellowship (1986–1988)
- Fellow of the Econometric Society (1991-)
- MBA Core Curriculum Cluster Award (1996–1997)

== Publications ==
=== Books ===
- Investment and the Value of Capital, Garland Publishing, Inc., New York, New York (1979)
- Federal Reserve Bank of Boston, Report 65 (December 1978)
- The Collected Papers of Franco Modigliani (editor), M.I.T. Press, Cambridge, Massachusetts, Volumes I, II, and III (1980)
- Macroeconomics, Addison-Wesley Publishing, Reading Massachusetts, with Ben S. Bernanke (1992); sixth edition with Dean Croushore
- Macroeconomics translated into Italian; second edition (1995)
- Macroeconomics translated into Japanese; third edition (1998), fourth edition (2001)
- Macroeconomics translated into Greek; fifth edition (2005)
- Macroeconomics translated into Chinese; sixth edition (2008)
- Macroeconomics, Canadian Edition, Addison-Wesley Publishers Limited, Don Mills, Ontario, Canada, with Ben S. Bernanke and Gregor W. Smith, Ronald D. Kneebone, first edition (1995)
- Macroeconomics, European Edition, Addison Wesley Longman Limited, Essex, England, with Ben S. Bernanke and Robert McNabb (1998)
