= Rudi Dornbusch =

German economist (1942–2002)

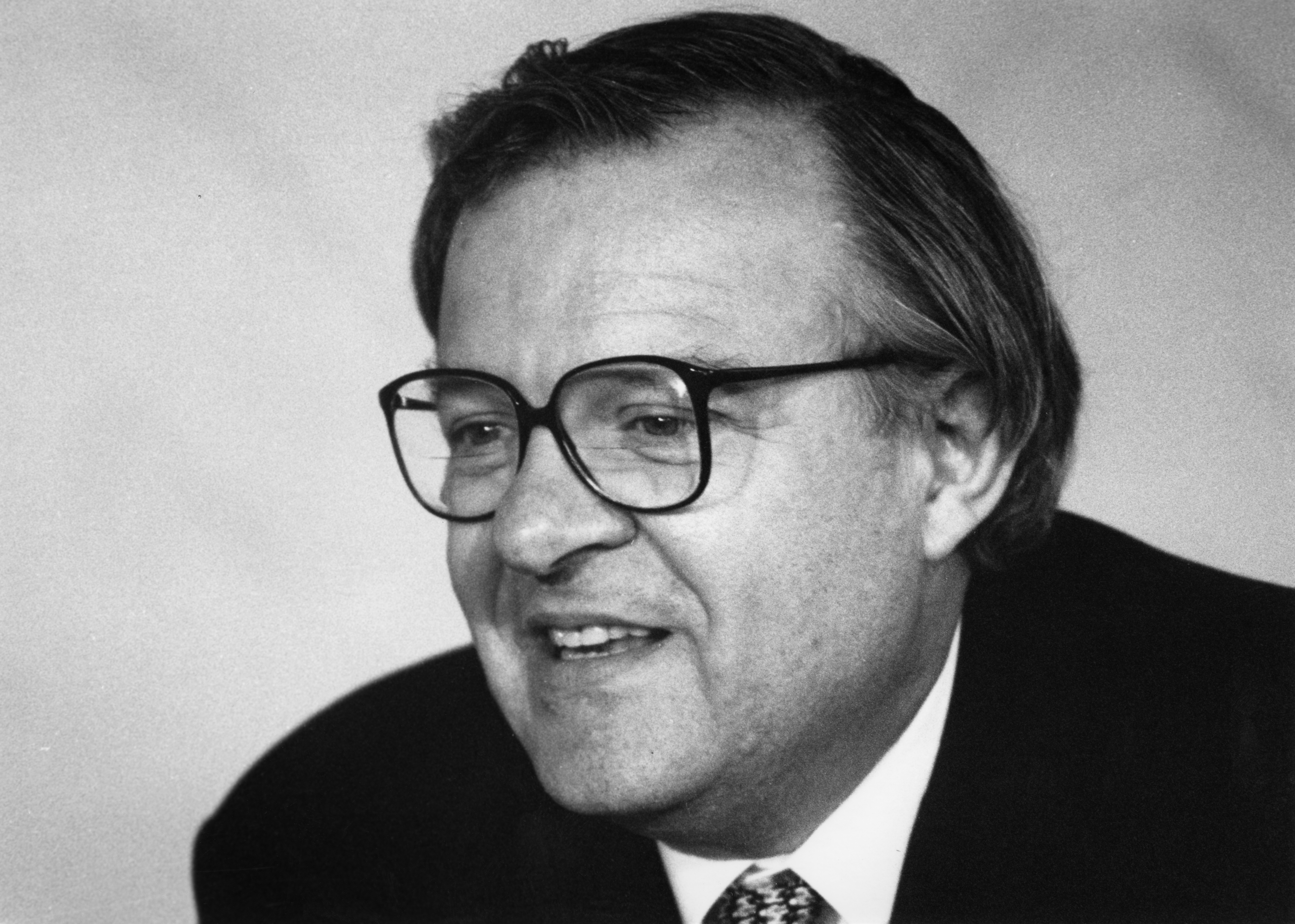
- Born: Rüdiger Dornbusch; June 8, 1942; Krefeld, Rhine Province, Germany
- Died: July 25, 2002 (aged 60); Washington, D.C., U.S.

Academic background
- Education: University of Geneva (BA); Graduate Institute of International Studies (BA); University of Chicago (MA, PhD)
- Doctoral advisor: Robert Mundell

Academic work
- Discipline: International economics
- School or tradition: New Keynesian economics
- Institutions: MIT (1975–2002); University of Chicago (1974–1975); University of Rochester (1972–1974)
- Doctoral students: Andrew Abel; Pedro Aspe; Eliana Cardoso; José De Gregorio; Jeffrey Frankel; Francesco Giavazzi; Ilan Goldfajn; Paul Krugman; Maurice Obstfeld; Kenneth Rogoff; Christina Romer; D. Nathan Sheets
- Notable ideas: Overshooting model Dornbusch's law
- Website: Information at IDEAS / RePEc

Rüdiger "Rudi" Dornbusch (June 8, 1942 – July 25, 2002) was a German economist who worked in the United States for most of his career.

== Early life and education ==
Dornbusch was born in Krefeld in 1942. After completing his secondary education at the Gymnasium am Moltkeplatz, he studied political science at the University of Geneva, and received his undergraduate degree (licence en sciences politiques) from the Graduate Institute of International Studies in 1966. He went on to graduate study at the University of Chicago, receiving a M.A. in economics in 1966, and a Ph.D. in economics in 1971.

== Career ==
He lectured briefly at the University of Chicago Booth School of Business, before serving as an assistant professor at the University of Rochester for two years; he then returned to Chicago, where he served as a professor of international economics. In 1975, he moved to MIT, where he was appointed an associate professor in the Department of Economics, and was made a full professor in 1984. He stayed at MIT until his death in 2002.

Throughout his career his main focus was on international economics, especially monetary policy, macroeconomic development, growth and international trade. According to some of his students and associates his talent was to extract the heart of a problem and make it understandable in simple terms. For example, he explained fluctuations in prices and exchange rates with great clarity (notably with his overshooting model). He succeeded in making a more realistic model than Mundell–Fleming model with regard to a small open economic system, considering exchange rate expectations. He worked also for the International Monetary Fund, contributing to the development of stabilisation policies, especially for Latin American countries. Along with Sebastián Edwards he coined the term macroeconomic populism. For more than fifteen years he served as an associate editor of the Quarterly Journal of Economics. He is also known for Dornbusch's Law:

The crisis takes a much longer time coming than you think, and then it happens much faster than you would have thought.

Together with Stanley Fischer he also wrote widely used undergraduate textbooks.

He died, aged sixty, from cancer.

== Major works ==
- Macroeconomics, McGraw-Hill, New York, 1990 (with S. Fischer) 5th ed.
- International Economic Policy: Theory and Evidence, Johns Hopkins University Press, (edited with J. A. Frenkel.)
- Open Economy Macroeconomics, Basic Books, New York, 1980.
- Inflation, Debt and Indexation, MIT Press, 1983. (ed. with M. H. Simonsen.)
- Financial Policies and the World Capital Market, University of Chicago Press, 1983. (ed. with P. Aspe and M. Obstfeld.)
- Economics, McGraw-Hill, New York, 1987, 2nd ed. (with S. Fischer and R. Schmalensee)
- Restoring Europe's Prosperity, (with O. Blanchard and R. Layard) MIT Press, 1986.
- Dollars, Debts and Deficits, MIT Press, 1987.
- Macroeconomics and Finance, (Essays in Honor of Franco Modigliani) MIT Press, 1987, (Ed. with S. Fischer)
- The Political Economy of Argentina, 1946–83, Macmillan, 1988. (ed. with G. diTella)
- Exchange Rates and Inflation MIT Press, 1988.
- Stopping High Inflation (ed. with M. Bruno, G. diTella and S. Fischer), MIT Press, 1988.
- The Open Economy: Tools for Policy Makers in Developing Countries (ed. with Leslie Helmers) Oxford University Press, 1988.
- Public Debt Management: Theory and History (ed. with Mario Draghi) Cambridge University Press, 1990.
- Reform in Eastern Europe (jointly with O. Blanchard et al.) MIT Press, 1991.
- Global Warming: Economic Policy Responses (ed. with J. Poterba) MIT Press, 1991.
- The Macroeconomics of Populism in Latin America (ed. with S. Edwards). MIT Press, 1991.
- East–West Migration (with Layard, Blanchard, and Krugman) MIT Press, 1992.
- Postwar Economic Reconstruction and Lessons for the East Today (ed. with W. Nolling and R. Layard) MIT Press, 1993
- Stabilization, Debt, and Reform: Policy Analysis For Developing Countries, Prentice Hall, 1993.
- Reform, Recovery and Growth (ed. with S. Edwards) University of Chicago Press, 1994.
- Financial Opening: Policy Lessons for Korea, (edited with Y. C. Park), Korea Institute of Finance, International Center For Economics Growth, 1995.
- Keys to Prosperity: Free Markets, Sound Money, and a Bit of Luck, MIT Press, 2000.

== Honors and distinctions ==
- John Simon Guggenheim Fellowship, 1979.
- Fellow of the American Academy of Arts and Sciences.
- Doctor honoris causa, University of Basel, 1988.
- Honorary Professor, Universidad del Pacífico, Lima, Peru, 1989.
- Foreign Member, Finnish Academy of Science and Letters, 1992.
- Harms Prize, Institute for World Economy, Kiel, 1992.
- Honorary doctorate, Catholic University, Lima Peru, 1998.
- Distinguished CES Fellow, Center for Economic Studies, LMU Munich, 1998.
- Concord Prize, Krefeld, 1999
- Named among the "Top 100 Economists in the World", according to IDEAS/RePEc
