= Eliana Tomkins =

British jazz singer

Eliana Tomkins is a British jazz singer, songwriter and musician. She ran JAZZ7 at Hugo's in London for about ten years, after which she continued to perform and arrange musical events. Her involvement in music continued with private soirees staged in a variety of musical styles, including classical events. She has now retired from the music scene to return to the arts.
