= Philip H. Dybvig =

American economist

Philip Dybvig
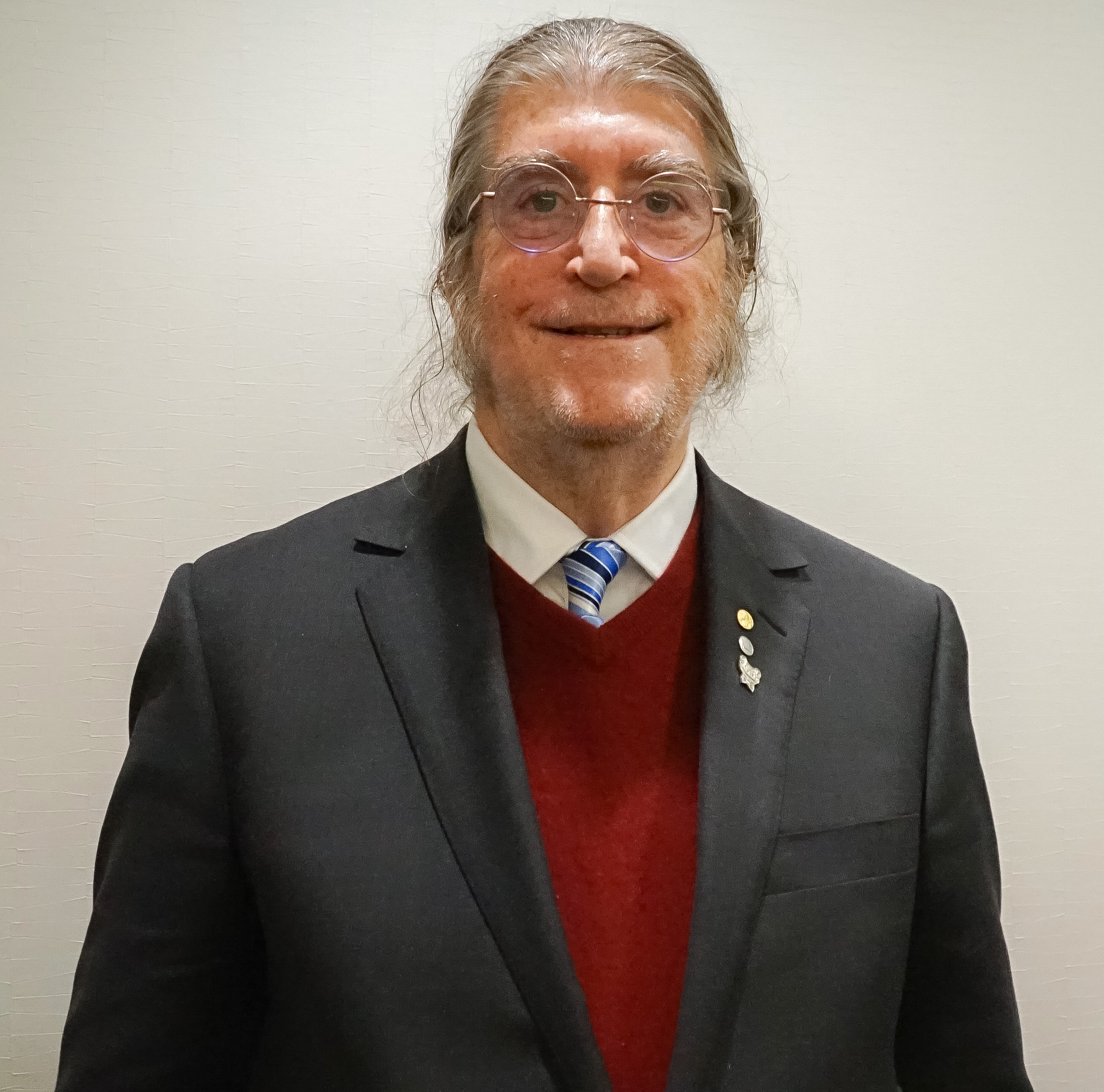
- Dybvig in 2025
- Born: May 22, 1955 (age 71); Gainesville, Florida, U.S.
- Awards: Nobel Memorial Prize in Economic Sciences (2022)

Academic background
- Education: Indiana University, Bloomington (BA); University of Pennsylvania; Yale University (MA, MPhil, PhD)

Academic work
- Institutions: Yale University; Princeton University; Olin Business School

Academic background
- Thesis: Recovering Additive Utility Functions (1979)
- Doctoral advisor: Stephen Ross

Philip Hallen Dybvig (born May 22, 1955) is an American economist. Since July 2026, he has been a university professor at Southwestern University of Finance and Economics and a visiting scholar at the Federal Reserve Bank of St. Louis. He was the Boatmen's Bancshares Professor of Banking and Finance at the Olin Business School of Washington University in St. Louis from 1990 to 2026.

== Career ==
Dybvig attended Indiana University and received in 1976 a BA in mathematics and physics. He then attended the economics PhD program at University of Pennsylvania for one year before transferring to Yale University, where he received the MA (1978), MPhil (1978), and PhD (1979) degrees in economics. His thesis, titled "Recovering additive utility functions", was supervised by Stephen A. Ross.

Dybvig specializes in asset pricing, banking, investments, and corporate governance. He was formerly a professor at Yale University, and assistant professor at Princeton University.

Dybvig was president of the Western Finance Association from 2002 to 2003, and was director of the Institute of Financial Studies at Southwestern University of Finance and Economics (Chengdu, PRC) from 2010 to 2021. He has been editor or associate editor of multiple journals, including the Journal of Economic Theory, Finance and Stochastics, Journal of Finance, Journal of Financial Intermediation, Journal of Financial and Quantitative Analysis, and Review of Financial Studies.

Dybvig is known for his work with Douglas Diamond on the Diamond–Dybvig model of bank runs.

Dybvig was awarded the 2022 Nobel Memorial Prize in Economic Sciences, jointly with Diamond and Ben Bernanke, "for research on banks and financial crises". Dybvig and Diamond wrote “Bank Runs, Deposit Insurance, and Liquidity” in 1983, in which they first introduced their mathematical model describing the vulnerability of banks during financial crises.

=== Controversies ===
In 2022, seven former students attending Washington University in St. Louis alleged that Dybvig sexually harassed them. One of the alumna alleged that Dybvig pulled her onto his lap for a photo, gifted her chocolates, touched her hand while sitting on a couch together, and messaged her on Facebook telling her that he missed her smile. Another student alleged that Dybvig wrapped his hand and fingers around her waist for a photo while not doing the same to a man on his other side in the photo.
