= Ben Bernanke =

American economist (born 1953)

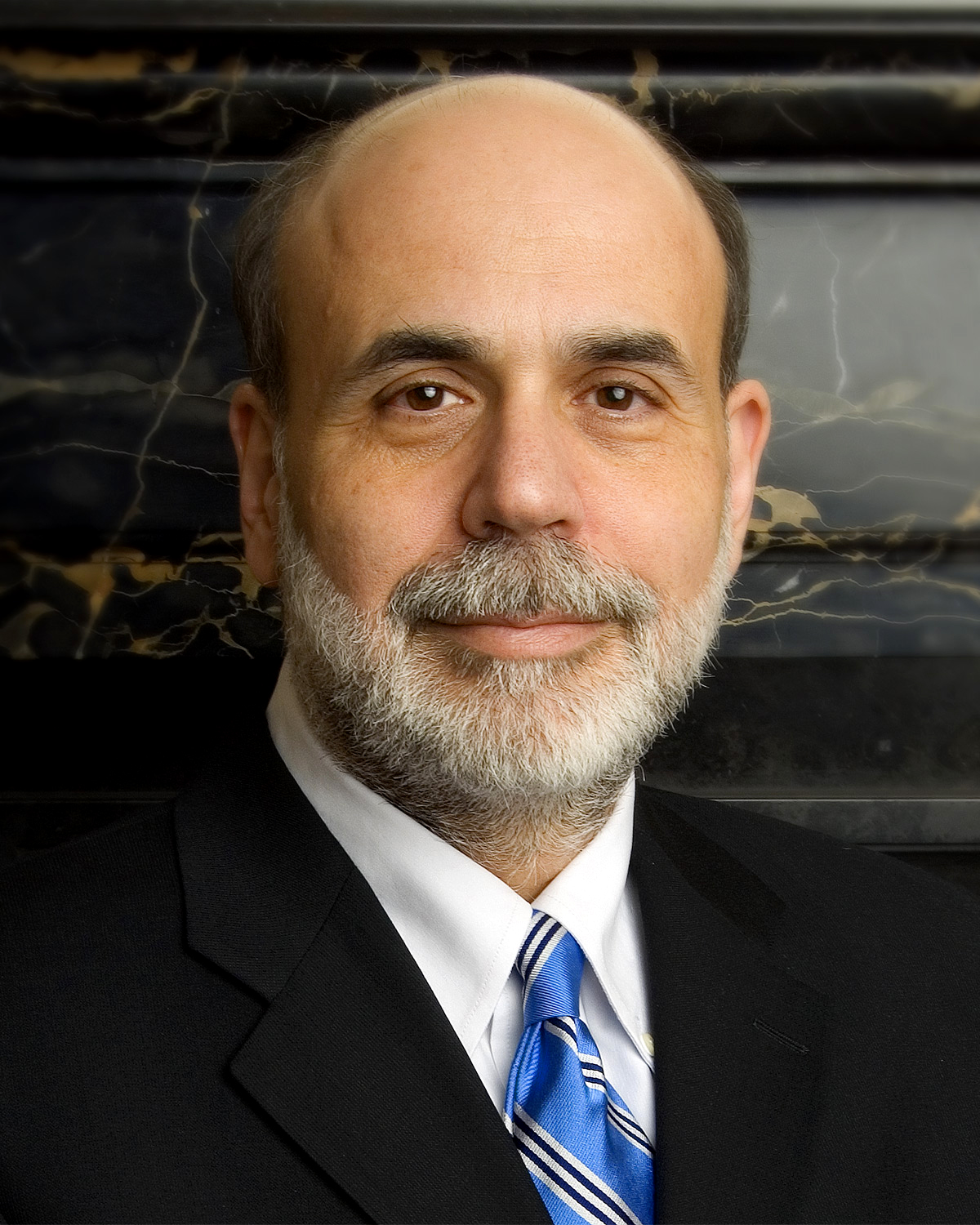
- Official portrait, 2008

14th Chairman of the Federal Reserve
- In office February 1, 2006 – January 31, 2014
- President: George W. Bush; Barack Obama
- Deputy: Roger Ferguson; Donald Kohn; Janet Yellen
- Preceded by: Alan Greenspan
- Succeeded by: Janet Yellen

Member of the Federal Reserve Board of Governors
- In office February 1, 2006 – January 31, 2014
- President: George W. Bush; Barack Obama
- Preceded by: Alan Greenspan
- Succeeded by: Stanley Fischer
- In office July 31, 2002 – June 21, 2005
- President: George W. Bush
- Preceded by: Edward W. Kelley Jr.
- Succeeded by: Kevin Warsh

23rd Chairman of the Council of Economic Advisers
- In office June 21, 2005 – January 31, 2006
- President: George W. Bush
- Preceded by: Harvey Rosen
- Succeeded by: Edward Lazear

Personal details
- Born: Ben Shalom Bernanke; December 13, 1953 (age 72) Augusta, Georgia, U.S.
- Party: Independent (2015–present)
- Other political affiliations: Republican (before 2015)
- Spouse: Anna Friedmann (m. 1978)
- Children: 2
- Education: Harvard University (AB, AM); Massachusetts Institute of Technology (PhD)
- Awards: Nobel Memorial Prize in Economic Sciences (2022)

Academic background
- Thesis: Long Term Commitments, Dynamic Optimization, and the Business Cycle (1979)
- Doctoral advisor: Stanley Fischer

Academic work
- Discipline: Macroeconomics

Ben Shalom Bernanke (/bərˈnæŋki/ bər-NANG-kee; born December 13, 1953) is an American economist who served as the 14th chairman of the Federal Reserve from 2006 to 2014. After leaving the Federal Reserve, he was appointed a distinguished fellow at the Brookings Institution. During his tenure as chairman, Bernanke oversaw the Federal Reserve's response to the 2008 financial crisis, for which he was named the 2009 Time Person of the Year. Before becoming Federal Reserve chairman, Bernanke was a tenured professor at Princeton University and chaired the Department of Economics there from 1996 to September 2002, when he went on public service leave. Bernanke was awarded the 2022 Nobel Memorial Prize in Economic Sciences, jointly with Douglas Diamond and Philip H. Dybvig, "for research on banks and financial crises", more specifically for his analysis of the Great Depression.

From August 5, 2002, until June 21, 2005, he was a member of the Board of Governors of the Federal Reserve System, proposed the Bernanke doctrine, and first discussed "the Great Moderation"—the theory that traditional business cycles have declined in volatility in recent decades through structural changes that have occurred in the international economy, particularly increases in the economic stability of developing nations, diminishing the influence of macroeconomic (monetary and fiscal) policy.

Bernanke then served as chairman of President George W. Bush's Council of Economic Advisers before President Bush nominated him to succeed Alan Greenspan as chairman of the United States Federal Reserve. His first term began on February 1, 2006. Bernanke was confirmed for a second term as chairman on January 28, 2010, after being renominated by President Barack Obama, who later referred to him as "the epitome of calm." His second term ended on January 31, 2014, when he was succeeded by Janet Yellen on February 3, 2014.

Bernanke wrote about his time as chairman of the Federal Reserve in his 2015 book, The Courage to Act, in which he revealed that the world's economy came close to collapse in 2007 and 2008. Bernanke asserts that it was only the novel efforts of the Fed (cooperating with other US agencies and agencies of other governments) that prevented an economic catastrophe greater than the Great Depression.

In July 2026, Bernanke became a trustee on Anthropic's Long-Term Benefit Trust.

== Early life and family ==
Bernanke was born in Augusta, Georgia, and was raised on East Jefferson Street in Dillon, South Carolina. His father Philip was a pharmacist and part-time theater manager. His mother Edna was an elementary school teacher. Bernanke has two younger siblings. His brother, Seth, is a lawyer in Charlotte, North Carolina. His sister, Sharon, is a longtime administrator at Berklee College of Music in Boston.

The Bernankes were one of the few Jewish families in Dillon and attended Ohav Shalom, a local synagogue; Bernanke learned Hebrew as a child from his maternal grandfather, Harold Friedman, a professional hazzan (cantor), shochet, and Hebrew teacher. Bernanke's father and uncle owned and managed a drugstore they purchased from Bernanke's paternal grandfather, Jonas Bernanke.

Jonas Bernanke was born in Boryslav, Austria-Hungary (today part of Ukraine), on January 23, 1891. He immigrated to the United States from Przemyśl, Poland, and arrived at Ellis Island, aged 30, on June 30, 1921, with his wife Pauline, aged 25. On the ship's manifest, Jonas's occupation is listed as "clerk" and Pauline's as "doctor med".

The family moved to Dillon from New York in the 1940s. Bernanke's mother gave up her job as a schoolteacher when her son was born and worked at the family drugstore. Ben Bernanke also worked there sometimes.

=== Young adult ===
As a teenager, Bernanke worked construction on a hospital and waited tables at a restaurant at nearby South of the Border, which was a roadside attraction, amusement park, and fireworks retailer near his hometown in Hamer, South Carolina, before leaving for college. To support himself throughout college, he continued to work during the summers at South of the Border.

=== Education ===
Bernanke was educated at East Elementary, J.V. Martin Junior High, and Dillon High School, where he was class valedictorian and played saxophone in the marching band. Since Dillon High School did not offer calculus at the time, Bernanke taught it to himself. Bernanke scored 1590 out of 1600 on the SAT and was a National Merit Scholar. He also was a contestant in the 1965 National Spelling Bee.

Bernanke entered Harvard College in 1971, where he lived in Winthrop House, as did the future chief executive officer of Goldman Sachs, Lloyd Blankfein, and graduated Phi Beta Kappa with an A.B. degree, in economics summa cum laude in 1975. He received a Ph.D. degree in economics from the Massachusetts Institute of Technology in 1979 after completing and defending his dissertation, Long-Term Commitments, Dynamic Optimization, and the Business Cycle. Bernanke's thesis adviser was the future governor of the Bank of Israel, Stanley Fischer, and his readers included Irwin S. Bernstein, Rüdiger Dornbusch, Robert Solow, and Peter Diamond of MIT and Dale Jorgenson of Harvard.

== Academic and government career (1979–2006) ==
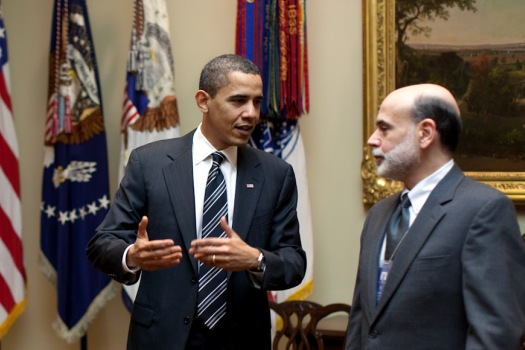
Bernanke meeting with United States President Barack Obama

Bernanke taught at the Stanford Graduate School of Business from 1979 until 1985, was a visiting professor at New York University and went on to become a tenured professor at Princeton University in the Department of Economics. He was a assistant professor from 1979 to 1983 and an associate professor from 1983 to 1985. He chaired that department from 1996 until September 2002, when he went on public service leave. He resigned his position at Princeton on July 1, 2005.

Bernanke served as a member of the Board of Governors of the Federal Reserve System from 2002 to 2005. In one of his first speeches as a governor, entitled "Deflation: Making Sure It Doesn't Happen Here", he outlined what has been referred to as the Bernanke doctrine.

As a member of the board of governors of the Federal Reserve System on February 20, 2004, Bernanke gave a speech in which he postulated that we are in a new era called the Great Moderation, where modern macroeconomic policy has decreased the volatility of the business cycle to the point that it should no longer be a central issue in economics.

In June 2005, Bernanke was named chairman of President George W. Bush's Council of Economic Advisers and resigned as Fed governor. The appointment was largely viewed as a test run to ascertain if Bernanke could be Bush's pick to succeed Greenspan as Fed chairman the next year. He held the post until January 2006.

== Chairman of the United States Federal Reserve ==
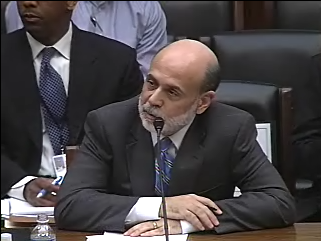
Bernanke testifying before the House Financial Services Committee responding to a question on February 10, 2009

On February 1, 2006, Bernanke began a fourteen-year term as a member of the Federal Reserve Board of Governors and a four-year term as chairman. By virtue of the chairmanship, he was on the Financial Stability Oversight Board that oversees the Troubled Asset Relief Program. He also served as chairman of the Federal Open Market Committee, the System's principal monetary policy making body. Bernanke's first meeting as chairman of the Federal Open Market Committee took place on March 27-28, 2006.

His first months as chairman of the Federal Reserve System were marked by difficulties communicating with the media. An advocate of more transparent Fed policy and clearer statements than Greenspan had made, he had to back away from his initial idea of stating clearer inflation goals as such statements tended to affect the stock market. Maria Bartiromo disclosed on CNBC comments from their private conversation at the White House Correspondents' Association Dinner. She reported that Bernanke said investors had misinterpreted his comments as indicating that he was "dovish" on inflation. He was sharply criticized for making public statements about Fed direction, which he said was a "lapse in judgment."

=== 2008 financial crisis ===
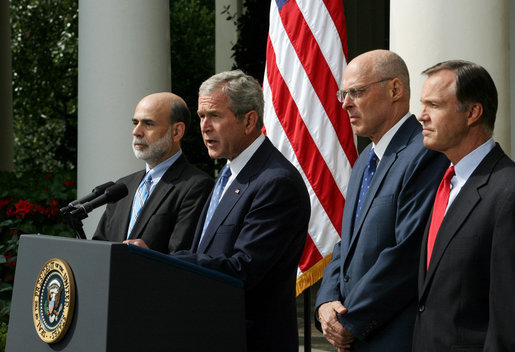
Bernanke (left) in September 2008 as President Bush speaks about the economy.

As the Great Recession deepened, Bernanke oversaw some unorthodox measures. Under his guidance, the Fed lowered its funds interest rate from 5.25% to 0.0% within less than a year. When this was considered insufficient to abate the liquidity crisis, the Fed initiated quantitative easing, creating $1.3 trillion from November 2008 to June 2010 and using the created money to buy financial assets from banks and from the government. On October 7, 2008, the Federal Reserve announced a new program called the Commercial Paper Funding Facility to help businesses obtain short term funding during the financial crisis.

=== Second term ===
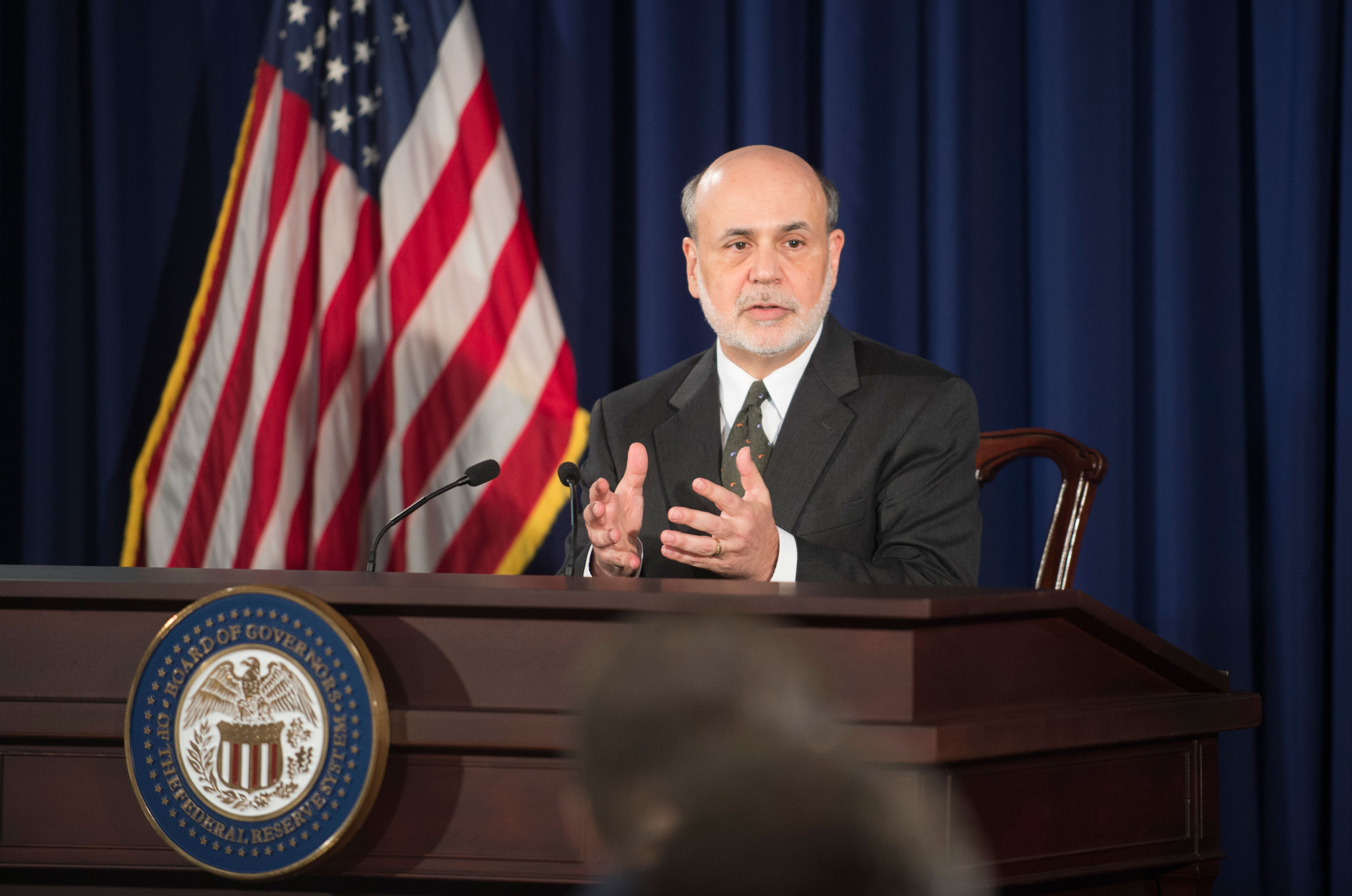
Bernanke answers questions in 2013 at FOMC press conference.

On August 25, 2009, President Obama announced he would nominate Bernanke to a second term as chairman of the Federal Reserve. In a short statement on Martha's Vineyard, with Bernanke standing at his side, Obama said Bernanke's background, temperament, courage and creativity helped to prevent another Great Depression in 2008. When Senate Banking Committee hearings on his nomination began on December 3, 2009, several senators from both parties indicated they would not support a second term.

However, Bernanke was confirmed for a second term as chairman on January 28, 2010, by a 70–30 vote of the full Senate, the narrowest margin, at the time, for any occupant of the position. (For the roll-call vote, see Obama confirmations, 2010.) The Senate first voted 77–23 to end debate, Bernanke winning more than the 60 approval votes needed to overcome the possibility of a filibuster. On a second vote to confirm, the 30 dissents came from 11 Democrats, 18 Republicans and one independent.

Bernanke was succeeded as chair of the Federal Reserve by Janet Yellen, the first woman to hold the position. Yellen was nominated on October 9, 2013, by President Obama and confirmed by the United States Senate on January 6, 2014.

== Controversies as Federal Reserve Chairman ==
Bernanke has been subjected to criticism concerning the 2008 financial crisis. According to The New York Times, Bernanke "has been attacked for failing to foresee the financial crisis, for bailing out Wall Street, and, most recently, for injecting an additional $600 billion into the banking system to give the slow recovery a boost."

=== Merrill Lynch merger with Bank of America ===
In a letter to Congress from then-New York State Attorney General Andrew Cuomo dated April 23, 2009, Bernanke was mentioned along with former Treasury Secretary Henry Paulson in allegations of fraud concerning the acquisition of Merrill Lynch by Bank of America. The letter alleged that the extent of the losses at Merrill Lynch was not disclosed to Bank of America by Bernanke and Paulson. When Ken Lewis, the chief executive officer of Bank of America, informed Paulson that Bank of America was exiting the merger by invoking the "Material Adverse Change" (MAC) clause, Paulson immediately called Lewis to a meeting in Washington. At the meeting, which allegedly took place on December 21, 2008, Paulson told Lewis that he and the board would be replaced if they invoked the MAC clause and additionally not to reveal the extent of the losses to shareholders. Paulson stated to Cuomo's office that he was directed by Bernanke to threaten Lewis in this manner.

Congressional hearings into these allegations were conducted on June 25, 2009, with Bernanke testifying that he did not bully Lewis. Under intense questioning by members of Congress, Bernanke said, "I never said anything about firing the board and the management [of Bank of America]." In further testimony, Bernanke said the Fed did nothing illegal or unethical in its efforts to convince Bank of America not to end the merger. Lewis told the panel that authorities expressed "strong views" but said he would not characterize their stance as improper.

=== AIG bailout ===
According to a January 26, 2010, column in The Huffington Post, a whistleblower has disclosed documents providing "'troubling details' of Bernanke's role in the AIG bailout". Republican Senator Jim Bunning of Kentucky said on CNBC that he had seen documents which show that Bernanke overruled recommendations from his staff in bailing out AIG. The columnist says this raises questions as to whether or not the decision to bail out AIG was necessary. Senators from both parties who support Bernanke say his actions averted worse problems and outweighed whatever responsibility this may have created for the 2008 financial crisis.

=== Edward Quince ===
The crisis in 2008 also made Ben Bernanke create a pseudonym, Edward Quince. According to the Wall Street Journal, the false name was evidence in a class-action lawsuit against the government by shareholders of AIG, which had been given a Fed-backed bailout when it was near collapse (see below). One of Mr. Quince's emails reads, "We think they are days from failure. They think it is a temporary problem. This disconnect is dangerous." Upon the revelation of the Quince pseudonym during the Starr v. United States trial, The New York Times created a cocktail inspired by Mr. Bernanke's chosen alias: the "Rye & Quince."

== Economic views ==
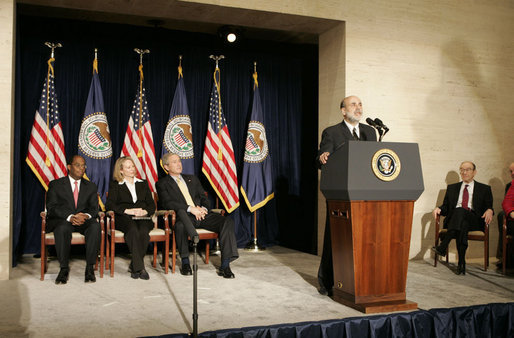
With his predecessor, Alan Greenspan, looking on, Chairman Ben Bernanke addresses President George W. Bush and others after being sworn into the Federal Reserve post. Also on stage with the President are Mrs. Anna Bernanke and Roger W. Ferguson Jr., Vice Chairman of the Federal Reserve.

Bernanke has given several lectures at the London School of Economics on monetary theory and policy. He has written two textbooks: an intermediate-level macroeconomics textbook coauthored with Andrew Abel (and also Dean Croushore in later editions) and an introductory textbook, covering both microeconomics and macroeconomics, coauthored with Robert H. Frank. Bernanke was the Director of the Monetary Economics Program of the National Bureau of Economic Research and the editor of the American Economic Review. He is among the 50 most published economists in the world according to IDEAS/RePEc. In 2025, Bernanke published an article titled "Credit, Debt Deflation, and the Great Depression Revisited" in the Journal of Economic Perspectives. The article examined how problems in credit markets made the Great Depression worsen.

Bernanke is particularly interested in the economic and political causes of the Great Depression, on which he has published numerous academic journal articles. Before Bernanke's work, the dominant monetarist theory of the Great Depression was Milton Friedman's view that it had been largely caused by the Federal Reserve's having reduced the money supply and has on several occasions argued that one of the biggest mistakes made during the period was to raise interest rates too early. In a speech on Milton Friedman's ninetieth birthday (November 8, 2002), Bernanke said:

"Let me end my talk by abusing slightly my status as an official representative of the Federal Reserve. I would like to say to Milton and Anna [Schwartz, Friedman's coauthor]: Regarding the Great Depression, you're right. We did it. We're very sorry. But thanks to you, we won't do it again."

Bernanke has cited Milton Friedman and Anna Schwartz in his decision to lower interest rates to zero. Anna Schwartz, however, was highly critical of Bernanke and wrote an opinion piece in The New York Times advising Obama against his reappointment as chairman of the Federal Reserve. Bernanke focused less on the role of the Federal Reserve and more on the role of private banks and financial institutions.

Bernanke found that the financial disruptions of 1930–33 reduced the efficiency of the credit allocation process; and that the resulting higher cost and reduced availability of credit acted to depress aggregate demand, identifying an effect he called the financial accelerator. When faced with a mild downturn, banks are likely to significantly cut back lending and other risky ventures. This further hurts the economy, creating a vicious cycle and potentially turning a mild recession into a major depression. Economist Brad DeLong, who had previously advocated his own theory for the Great Depression, notes that the 2008 financial crisis raised the pertinence of Bernanke's theory.

In 2002, following coverage of concerns about deflation in the business news, Bernanke gave a speech about the topic. In that speech, he mentioned that the government in a fiat money system owns the physical means of creating money and to maintain market liquidity. Control of the money supply implies that the government can always avoid deflation by simply issuing more money. He said, "The U.S. government has a technology, called a printing press (or today, its electronic equivalent), that allows it to produce as many U.S. dollars as it wishes at no cost."

He referred to a statement made by Milton Friedman about using a "helicopter drop" of money into the economy to fight deflation. Bernanke's critics have since referred to him as "Helicopter Ben" or to his "helicopter printing press." In a footnote to his speech, Bernanke noted that "people know that inflation erodes the real value of the government's debt and, therefore, that it is in the interest of the government to create some inflation."

For example, while Greenspan publicly supported President Clinton's deficit reduction plan and the Bush tax cuts, Bernanke, when questioned about taxation policy, said that it was none of his business, his exclusive remit being monetary policy, and said that fiscal policy and wider society related issues were what politicians were for and got elected for. But Bernanke has been identified by The Wall Street Journal and a close colleague as a "libertarian-Republican" in the mold of Alan Greenspan.

In 2005 Bernanke coined the term saving glut, the idea that relatively high level of worldwide savings was holding down interest rates and financing the current account deficits of the United States. (Alternative reasons include relatively low worldwide investment coupled with low U.S. savings.)

As the recession began in 2007, many economists urged Bernanke (and the rest of the Federal Open Market Committee) to lower the federal funds rate below what it had done. For example, Larry Summers, later named Director of the White House's National Economic Council under President Obama, wrote in the Financial Times on November 26, 2007—in a column in which he argued that recession was likely—that "maintaining demand must be the over-arching macro-economic priority. That means the Federal Reserve System has to get ahead of the curve and recognize—as the market already has—that levels of the Federal Funds rate that were neutral when the financial system was working normally are quite contractionary today."

David Leonhardt of The New York Times wrote, on January 30, 2008, that "Dr. Bernanke's forecasts have been too sunny over the last six months. [On] the other hand, his forecast was a lot better than Wall Street's in mid-2006. Back then, he resisted calls for further interest rate increases because he thought the economy might be weakening."

== After the Federal Reserve ==
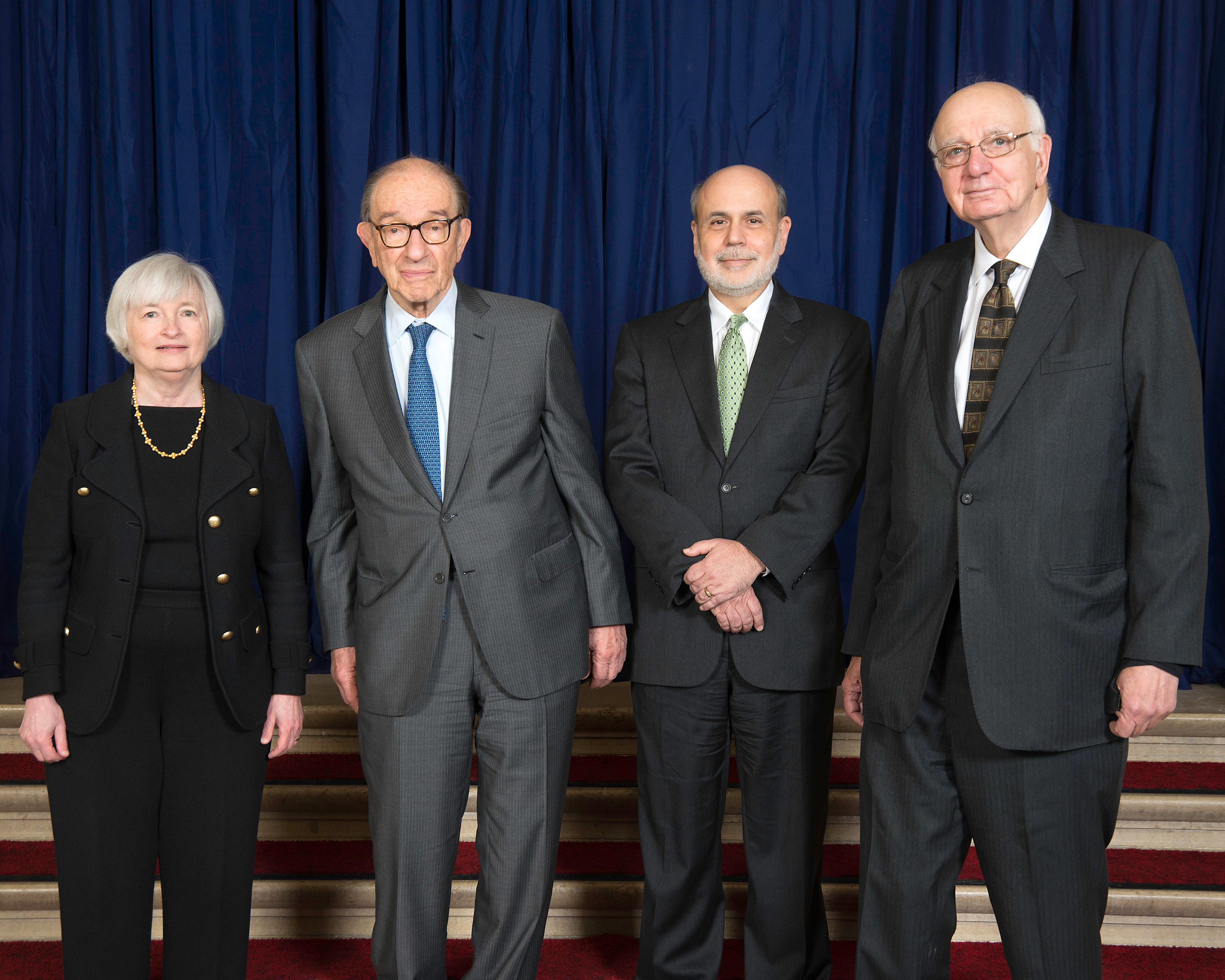
From left to right: Janet Yellen, Alan Greenspan, Ben Bernanke, and Paul Volcker, May 1, 2014.

In a speech at the American Economics Association conference in January 2014, Bernanke reflected on his tenure as chairman of the Federal Reserve. He expressed his hope that economic growth was building momentum and stated that he was confident that the central bank would be able to withdraw its support smoothly.

In an October 2014 speech, Bernanke disclosed that he was unsuccessful in efforts to refinance his home. He suggested that lenders "may have gone a little bit too far on mortgage credit conditions".

On October 9, 2014, Bernanke testified in Starr v. United States, a lawsuit alleging that the government cheated American International Group shareholders of $40 billion by demanding a 79.9% stake in the company in exchange for the company's bailout. "Certainly there was an enormous amount of stress on financial institutions" in the fall of 2008 after mortgage financiers Fannie Mae and Freddie Mac had been taken over by the government and fear cascaded through financial markets," Bernanke said. "We very, very much did not want to make the loan," he said. "We had little information the loan would be effective."

Since February 2014, Bernanke has been employed as a Distinguished Fellow in Residence with the Economic Studies Program at the Brookings Institution. In 2019, Bernanke served as president of the American Economic Association, a professional organization for economist.

On April 16, 2015, it was announced publicly that Bernanke will work with Citadel, the $25 billion hedge fund founded by billionaire Kenneth C. Griffin, as a senior adviser. In the same month it was revealed that Bernanke would also join PIMCO as a senior advisor.

In his 2015 book, The Courage to Act, Bernanke revealed that he was no longer a Republican, having "lost patience with Republicans' susceptibility to the know-nothing-ism of the far right. ... I view myself now as a moderate independent, and I think that's where I'll stay."

== The Courage to Act (2015) ==
In 2015, Ben Bernanke published The Courage to Act: A Memoir of a Crisis and its Aftermath. The book explains his experience as chairman of the Federal Reserve during the 2008 finical crisis. Bernanke describes the difficult decisions made by the government officials as banks and other financial institutions struggled.

One major topic in the book is the collapse of large financial companies. Bernanke discusses how the Federal Reserve and the Treasury Department worked together to prevent more businesses from failing. He explains the emergency actions taken to help stabilize the banking system and support the economy.

The Great Depression helped prepare him for the financial crisis. He believed that understanding past economic problems was important when deciding how to respond to new ones. Bernanke describes the challenges of making decisions while facing economic uncertainty and criticism from the public.

The book provides an inside look at how the Federal Reserve handled the financial crisis and explains the reasoning behind many of its decisions.

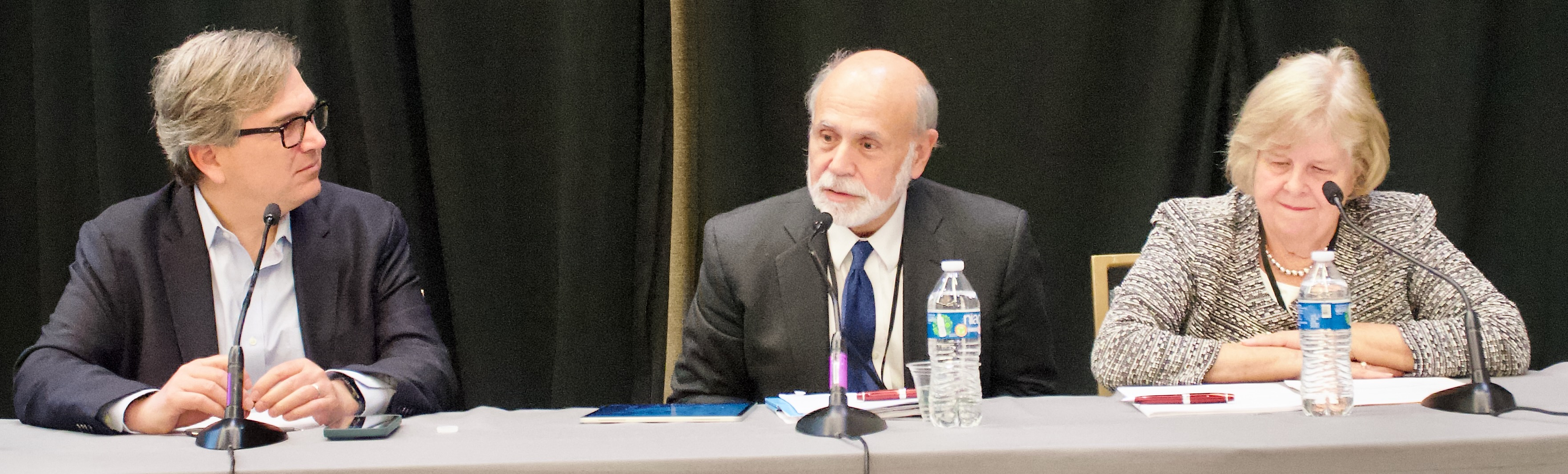
Jason Furman, Bernanke, and Christina Romer at AEA 2025

Bernanke published in 2022 his latest book titled 21st Century Monetary Policy: The Federal Reserve from the Great Inflation to COVID-19, where he assesses the successes as well as failures of the Federal Reserve since its inception. The book received a positive review from the New York Times saying the "book is intended to help future generations of economic policymakers, and it probably will."

== Statements on deficit reduction and reform of Social Security/Medicare ==
Bernanke favors reducing the U.S. budget deficit, particularly by reforming the Social Security and Medicare entitlement programs. During a speech delivered on April 7, 2010, he warned that the U.S. must soon develop a "credible" plan to address the pending funding crisis faced by "entitlement programs such as Social Security and Medicare" or "in the longer run we will have neither financial stability nor healthy economic growth." Bernanke said that formulation of such a plan would help the economy in the near term, even if actual implementation of the plan might have to wait until the economic outlook improves.

His remarks were most likely intended for the federal government's executive and legislative branches, since entitlement reform is a fiscal exercise that will be accomplished by the Congress and the President rather than a monetary task falling within the implementation powers of the Federal Reserve. Bernanke also pointed out that deficit reduction will necessarily consist of either raising taxes, cutting entitlement payments and other government spending, or some combination of both.

== Nobel Prize ==
In 2022, Bernanke shared the Sveriges Riksbank Prize in Economic Sciences in Memory of Alfred Nobel with Douglas Diamond and Philip Dybvig "for research on banks and financial crises." The Royal Swedish Academy of Sciences said the laureates' work improved understanding of banks' role in the economy, particularly during financial crises, and why avoiding bank collapses is important. It highlighted Bernanke's analysis of the Great Depression, which showed how bank runs contributed to the crisis becoming deep and prolonged.

== Personal life ==
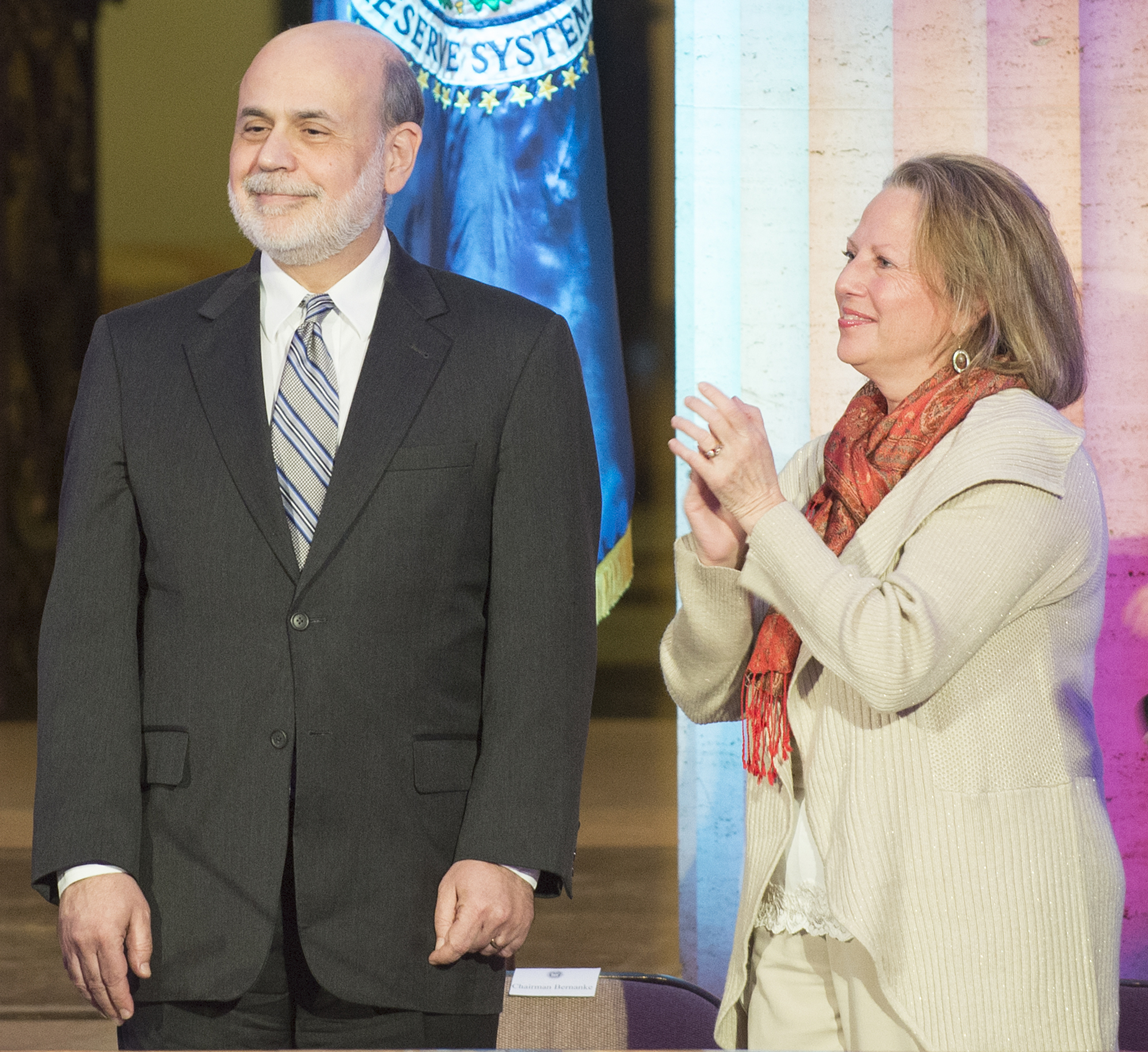
Ben and Anna Bernanke

Bernanke met his wife, Anna, a schoolteacher, on a blind date and they married on May 29, 1978. The Bernankes have two children, Joel and Alyssa. He is an ardent fan of the Washington Nationals baseball team, and frequently attends games at Nationals Park.

When Bernanke left Stanford to accept a position at Princeton, he and his family moved to Montgomery Township, New Jersey, in 1985, where Bernanke's children attended the local public schools. Bernanke served for six years as a member of the board of education of the Montgomery Township School District.

In 2009, The Wall Street Journal reported that Bernanke was a victim of identity theft, a spreading crime the Federal Reserve has for years issued warnings about.

Bernanke is Jewish. As a teenager in the 1960s, Bernanke helped roll the Torah scrolls in his local synagogue. Although he keeps his beliefs private, his friend Mark Gertler, chairman of New York University's economics department, says they are "embedded in who he (Bernanke) is." Once Bernanke was at Harvard for his freshman year, fellow Dillon native Kenneth Manning took him to Brookline for Rosh Hashanah services.

== Awards and honors ==
- Fellow of the Econometric Society (1997)
- Fellow of the American Academy of Arts and Sciences (2001)
- Order of the Palmetto (2006)
- Member of the American Philosophical Society (2006)
- Distinguished Leadership in Government Award, Columbia Business School (2008)
- In 2009, the South Carolina Department of Transportation (SCDOT) Commission approved a resolution on February 21 to name Exit 190 along Interstate Highway 95 in Dillon County the Ben Bernanke Interchange.
- In 2009, he was named the Time magazine person of the year.
- In 2020 he was awarded the BBVA Foundation Frontiers of Knowledge Award in the category "Economics, Finance and Management".
- Member of the National Academy of Sciences (2021)
- Along with Douglas W. Diamond and Philip H. Dybvig, he was awarded the 2022 Sveriges Riksbank Prize in Economic Sciences in Memory of Alfred Nobel "for research on banks and financial crises".

== Bibliography ==
- Bernanke, Ben S. (June 1983). "Nonmonetary Effects of the Financial Crisis in the Propagation of the Great Depression". American Economic Review. 73 (3): 257–276. JSTOR 1808111.
- Bernanke, Ben S.; Blinder, Alan S. (September 1992). "The Federal Funds Rate and the Channels of Monetary Transmission". American Economic Review. 82 (4): 901–921. JSTOR 2117350.
- Bernanke, Ben S.; Gertler, Mark; Watson, Mark (May 27, 1997). "Systematic Monetary Policy and the Effects of Oil Price Shocks". C.V. Starr Center for Applied Economics.
- Bernanke, Ben S.; Laubach, Thomas; Mishkin, Frederic S.; Posen, Adam S. (2001). Inflation Targeting: Lessons from the International Experience. Princeton University Press. ISBN 0-691-08689-3.
- Bernanke, Ben S. (2004). Essays on the Great Depression. Princeton University Press. ISBN 0-691-11820-5.
  (Description, TOC, and preview of ch. 1, "The Macroeconomics of the Great Depression")
- Abel, Andrew B.; Bernanke, Ben S.; Croushore, Dean (2007). Macroeconomics (6th ed.). Addison–Wesley. ISBN 978-0-321-41554-7.
- Frank, Robert H.; Bernanke, Ben S. (2007). Principles of Macroeconomics. McGraw–Hill. ISBN 978-0-07-336265-6.
- Bernanke, Ben S. (October 2015). The Courage to Act: A Memoir of a Crisis and Its Aftermath. W. W. Norton & Company. ISBN 978-0-393-24721-3.
- Bernanke, Ben S. (October 2015). "Notes from The Courage to Act" (PDF). W. W. Norton & Company.
- Bernanke, Ben S. (2015). The Federal Reserve and the Financial Crisis. Princeton University Press. ISBN 978-0691165578.
- Bernanke, Ben S.; Geithner, Timothy F.; Paulson, Henry M. (2019). Firefighting: The Financial Crisis and Its Lessons. Penguin Books. ISBN 978-0143134480.
- Bernanke, Ben S.; Geithner, Timothy F.; Paulson, Henry M. (2020). First Responders: Inside the U.S. Strategy for Fighting the 2007-2009 Global Financial Crisis. Yale University Press. ISBN 978-0300244441.
- Bernanke, Ben S. (2023) [2022]. 21st Century Monetary Policy: The Federal Reserve from the Great Inflation to COVID-19 (Reprint ed.). W. W. Norton & Company. ISBN 978-1324064879.

== See also ==
- Causes of the Great Depression
- Great Contraction
- Greenspan put
- 2008–2009 Keynesian resurgence
- List of Jewish Nobel laureates

== Footnotes ==
Government offices
Preceded by Edward W. Kelley Jr.	Member of the Federal Reserve Board of Governors; 2002–2005	Succeeded by Kevin Warsh
Preceded by Alan Greenspan	Member of the Federal Reserve Board of Governors; 2006–2014	Succeeded by Stanley Fischer
Preceded by Alan Greenspan	Chairman of the Federal Reserve; 2006–2014	Succeeded by Janet Yellen
Political offices
Preceded by Harvey Rosen	Chairman of the Council of Economic Advisers; 2005–2006	Succeeded by Edward Lazear
Academic offices
Preceded by Olivier Blanchard	President of the American Economic Association; 2019–2020	Succeeded by Janet Yellen
