= Douglas Diamond =

American economist

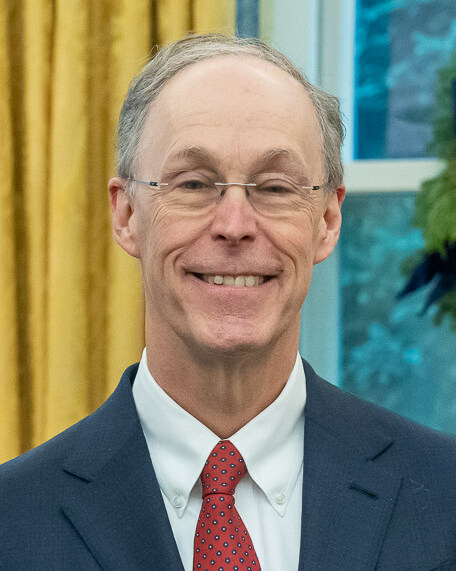
- Diamond at the White House in 2022
- Born: October 25, 1953 (age 72); Chicago, Illinois, U.S.
- Known for: Diamond–Dybvig model
- Children: Rebecca Diamond
- Awards: Nobel Memorial Prize in Economic Sciences (2022)

Academic background
- Education: Brown University (BA); Yale University (MA, MPhil, PhD)
- Thesis: Essays on Information and Financial Intermediation (1980)
- Doctoral advisor: Stephen A. Ross

Academic work
- Discipline: Economics
- Institutions: University of Chicago

Douglas Warren Diamond (born October 25, 1953) is an American economist. He is the Merton H. Miller Distinguished Service Professor of Finance at the University of Chicago Booth School of Business, where he has taught since 1979. Diamond specializes in the study of financial intermediaries, financial crises, and liquidity. He is a former president of the American Finance Association (2003) and the Western Finance Association (2001–02).

In October 2022, Diamond was awarded the Nobel Memorial Prize in Economic Sciences jointly with Ben Bernanke and Philip H. Dybvig. The prize was awarded in recognition of the economists' "research on banks and financial crises"

Diamond is best known for his work on financial crises and bank runs, particularly the influential Diamond–Dybvig model published in 1983 and the Diamond model of delegated monitoring published in 1984. In 2016, he was awarded the CME Group-MSRI Prize in Innovative Quantitative Applications.

== Early life and education ==
Douglas Warren Diamond was born on October 25, 1953. He was raised in the Hyde Park neighborhood of Chicago by a single mother.

As an adolescent, Diamond originally intended to study molecular biology. Diamond matriculated at Brown University, where he decided to study economics instead, after taking a course on Milton Friedman and Anna Schwartz's A Monetary History of the United States. He graduated Phi Beta Kappa from Brown with a Bachelor of Arts degree in economics in 1975. The following year, and in 1977 Diamond earned master's degrees, and ultimately a PhD in economics in 1980 from Yale University. At Yale, both Diamond and future Nobel co-recipient Philip H. Dybvig were advised by Stephen A. Ross. According to Diamond, the two would regularly converse outside Ross' office while waiting for appointments with him.

A later version of the third chapter of Diamond's 1980 doctoral dissertation "Essays on Information and Financial Intermediation" was republished in 1984 in The Review of Economic Studies under the title "Financial Intermediation and Delegated Monitoring" This publication coined the term "delegated monitoring" and described Diamond's formal model of delegated monitoring. According to the Committee for the Nobel Memorial Prize in Economic Sciences, Diamond's model is considered "the first truly micro-founded theory of financial intermediation." Since its publication, Diamond (1984) has become a key publication in scholarship concerning financial intermediation.

== The Diamond–Dybvig Model ==
The Diamond–Dybvig model, first introduced in the Journal of Political Economy in 1983, remains one of the most influential frameworks in modern banking theory. The model demonstrates how banks engage in liquidity transformation by using short-term deposits from savers to fund long-term lending activities. This maturity mismatch makes banks vulnerable to runs if large numbers of depositors simultaneously demand their funds. Diamond and Dybvig show that government-provided deposit insurance can prevent self-fulfilling bank runs by assuring depositors that their funds are safe.

The model has become a foundational tool for academic research in banking, macroeconomics, and financial stability. Its insights have strongly influenced governmental and central bank policy, particularly in the design and justification of deposit insurance systems and liquidity regulations around the world. Following the global financial crisis of 2008, the framework provided theoretical support for liquidity backstops, emergency lending facilities, and stricter oversight of banks’ balance sheets.

In recent years, researchers have extended the Diamond–Dybvig model to analyze runs in nonbank financial institutions, including money market mutual funds and cryptocurrency exchanges, where similar liquidity mismatches exist.

== Career ==
Since 1979, Diamond has taught at the University of Chicago Booth School of Business. He has held the Merton H. Miller Distinguished Service Professorship since July 2000, having previously held the Theodore O. Yntema Professorship. From 2010 to 2014, Diamond directed the Fama-Miller Center for Research in Finance at the University of Chicago.

Diamond has additionally served as a visiting scholar at the University of Bonn (1983) and the Bank of Japan (1999), as visiting professor at the Hong Kong University of Science and Technology and MIT Sloan School of Management, and as a professor and teaching fellow at the Yale School of Management.

=== Nobel Memorial Prize in Economics ===
In the early 2010s, Diamond was repeatedly floated as a contender for the Nobel Memorial Prize in Economic Sciences. In 2011, Diamond was listed by Thomson Reuters as one of the "researchers likely to be in contention for Nobel honors based on the citation impact of their published research." He was again named as a contender for the prize in 2013 by economist Hubert Fromlet, The Wall Street Journal, and Catherine Rampell, writing for The New York Times.

On October 10, 2022, Diamond received the Nobel Memorial Prize in Economic Sciences jointly with long-time collaborator Philip H. Dybvig and former Chair of the Federal Reserve, Ben Bernanke. Much of the work for which the prize was awarded stems from work Diamond and Dybvig published in the early and mid-1980s.

== Personal life ==
Diamond has been married to Elizabeth Cammack Diamond since 1982. The couple has two children, economist Rebecca Diamond and William Diamond, James M. Johannes Professor of Finance at the University of Wisconsin-Madison.

He is the son of Leon Diamond, a psychiatrist, and Margaret Gunkel Seehafer, a social worker and professor.

== Honors and awards ==
- Fellow, Econometric Society (since 1990)
- Member, American Academy of Arts and Sciences (elected 2001)
- Fellow, American Finance Association (selected 2004)
- Economic Theory Fellow, Society for the Advancement of Economic Theory (2016)
- Member, National Academy of Sciences (elected 2017)

=== Awards ===
- Morgan Stanley-American Finance Association Award for Excellence in Finance, 2012
- Doctor Honoris Causa, University of Zurich, 2013
- CME Group-MSRI Prize in Innovative Quantitative Applications, 2016
- Wilbur Cross Medal, 2017
- Onassis Prize in Finance, 2018
- Nobel Memorial Prize in Economic Sciences, 2022
- Doctor of Humane Letters from Brown University, 2023.

== Publications ==
=== Articles ===
- Diamond, Douglas; Rajan, Raghuram (April 2009). "Fear of Fire Sales and the Credit Freeze". The Quarterly Journal of Economics. 126 (2): 557–591. doi:10.3386/w14925.
- Diamond, Douglas W.; Rajan, Raghuram G. (April 2001). "Liquidity Risk, Liquidity Creation, and Financial Fragility: A Theory of Banking" (PDF). Journal of Political Economy. 109 (2): 287–327. doi:10.1086/319552. S2CID 32078187.
- Diamond, Douglas W. (August 1991). "Monitoring and Reputation: The Choice between Bank Loans and Directly Placed Debt". Journal of Political Economy. 99 (4): 689–721. doi:10.1086/261775. S2CID 56293289.
- Diamond, Douglas W. (1984). "Financial Intermediation and Delegated Monitoring". The Review of Economic Studies. 51 (3): 393–414. doi:10.2307/2297430. JSTOR 2297430.
- Diamond, Douglas W.; Dybvig, Philip H. (June 1983). "Bank Runs, Deposit Insurance, and Liquidity" (PDF). Journal of Political Economy. 91 (3): 401–419. doi:10.1086/261155. S2CID 14214187.

== See also ==
- List of Jewish Nobel laureates
