= Eliana García Laguna =

Mexican politician

- Born: 21 February 1958 (age 67); Guerrero, Mexico
- Occupation: Politician

Eliana García Laguna (born 21 February 1958) is a Mexican politician and member of civil society organizations. As of 2003 she served as Deputy of the LIX Legislature of the Mexican Congress as a plurinominal representative.
