= Eliana Cardoso =

Brazilian economist

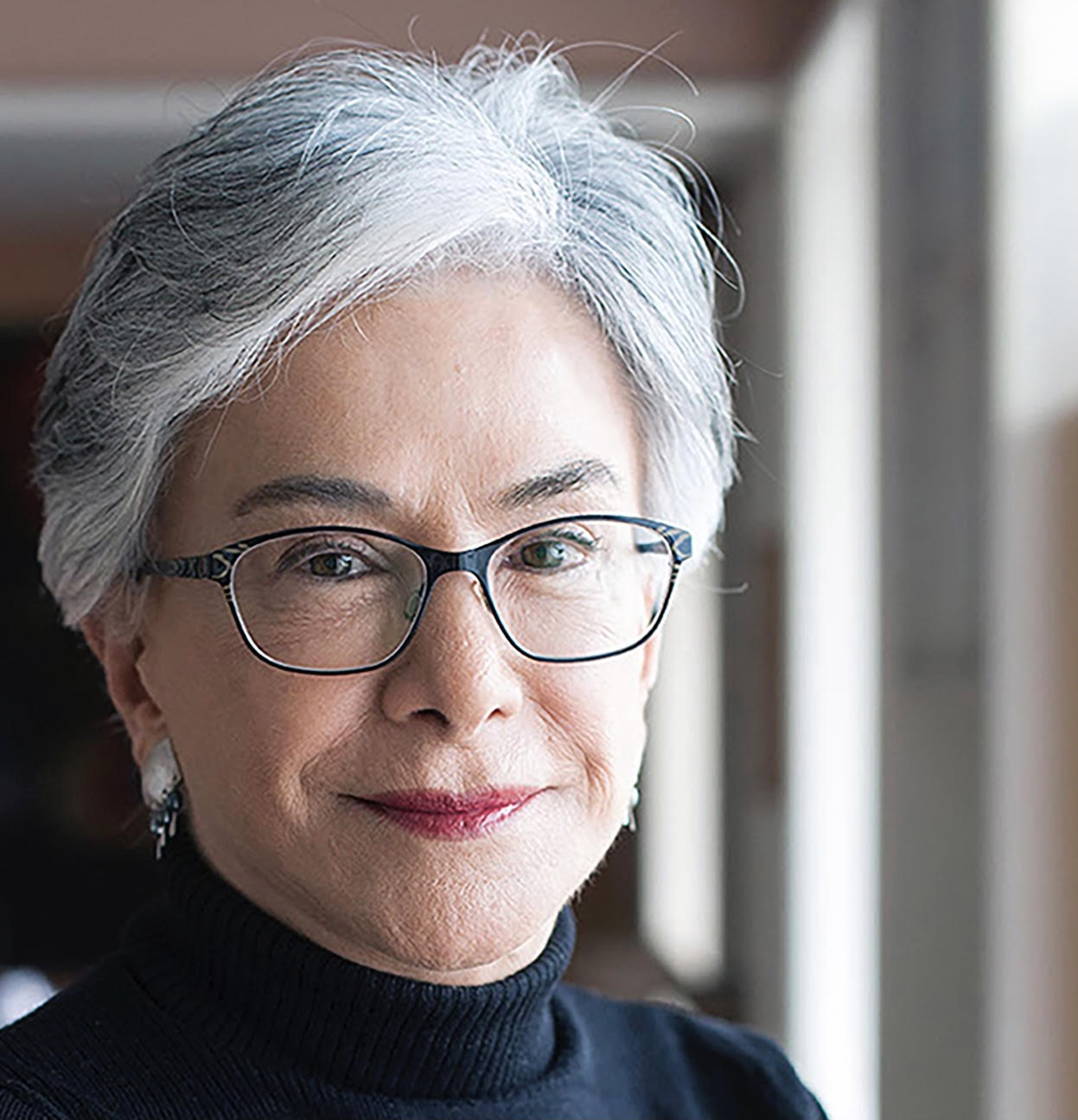
Eliana Anastasia Cardoso

Eliana Anastasia Cardoso (born 28 February 1944) is a professor of economics at the São Paulo School of Economics. She worked at both the World Bank and the IMF. She holds a PhD from the Massachusetts Institute of Technology (MIT) and a master from the Universidade de Brasília.

== Career ==
At the World Bank, she was lead Economist for China from 1993 to 1995. Se was also a Sector Manager in Latin America from 1998 to 2000. She also worked for the research department of the IMF. Cardoso was Secretary for International Affairs at the Ministry of Finance in Brazil.

== Publications ==
Her research is on international economics and macroeconomics. She has published articles on capital flows, inflation, exchange rates and conflict among other things. One of her books explores exchange rate regimes in the Middle East and another one analyses the state of the Cuban economy after communism. She has also published a book on latin america's economy. She has published many articles and has just short of 5000 citations. She is the 698 most influential female economist in the world according to the RePEc/Ideas ranking.
