= Household economics =

Economics concept

Household economics analyses all the decisions made by a household. These analyses are both at the microeconomic and macroeconomic level. This field analyses the structures of households, the behavior of family members, and their broader influence on society, including: household consumption, division of labour within the household, allocation of time to household production, marriage, divorce, fertility, investment in children, and resource allocation. Malthus and Adam Smith studied the economics of the family in part by looking at the relationship between family size and living wage. Similarly, J.S. Mill and Le Play analysed the impacts of different family structures on the standard of living of different family members through redistribution of family resources, insurance and self production.

Since the beginning of the 20th century, most economists have focused on business and monetary dimensions of the economy without consideration of household behavior. The study of consumption and household production was marginalized by mainstream economics. Economics theory applied to households, however, can help to understand interactions between the public and private sectors of society in ways that inform policies related to education, health, welfare and retirement.

Household economics can be divided into two models: the unitary model and the collective model.

== The unitary model ==
The microeconomics approach of the household economics embodied by the unitary model was developed by Gary Becker. He developed the New Household Economics theory (NHE) and the A Treatise on the Family, written in 1981, was one this major work on the family economics and other aspects of the household economics. Becker's work has taken place at a time when the American and more generally Western family has been undergoing profound changes since the Second World War. His model helped to described resource allocation, utility maximization processes and decision making first in the United States and in other developed countries.

Economists often assume that agents are rational, meaning they are always choosing the best possible option given their own preferences and constraints. These preferences are generally expressed through a utility function and these constraints through a budget line.

The unitary model assumes the household is acting as a single individual. This translates to the household having a unique utility function and a common budget constraint. However, this model does not take into account the plurality of decision-makers and the different preferences they might have. Becker attempts to resolve this problem of conflicts between household members thanks to his altruism model, also known as the Rotten kid theorem. The theorem asserts that one person, sometimes referred to as a benevolent dictator, controls the household's resources and has altruistic preferences, meaning they care about other family members. As a result, the preferences of other family members enter the benevolent dictator's utility function as a normal good. Each household member then maximises their own preferences subject to their budget constraint set by the benevolent dictator, resulting in the household to behave as one individual. As explained by Becker (1974):

The "family's" utility function is the same as that of one of its members not because this member has dictatorial power over the other members, but because he (or she!) cares sufficiently about all the other members to voluntarily transfer resources to them. Each member can have total freedom of action; indeed, the person making the transfers would not change the consumption of any member even with dictatorial power!

This will result in all other family members, who have selfish preferences, to seek to maximise the total household income as it will be in their interest of maximising their own utility.

However, as explained by Ted Bergstrom's (1989) paper, the Rotten Kid theorem requires the assumption of the transferability of utility between household members. Bergstrom demonstrates that this assumption of transferability of utility is a necessary and sufficient condition for the Rotten Kid theorem, meaning that it assumes the utility of a selfish member of the household is transferred to the benevolent dictator. However, this assumption does not always hold. For example, Bergstrom showed that in the case of consuming one private good and the demand for public goods is identical for all efficient bundles, household members require generalised quasi-linear preferences for transferability of utility to occur.

The unitary model has been criticised for assuming that household expenditure should remain unchanged if there are variations in the distribution or the origin of the household's income. Studies conducted by Shelly Lundberg, Robert Pollak and Terence Wales (1997), Ward-Batts (2008) and Armand et al. (2020) found evidence that if government cash-transfers are given to either the mother or father, household expenditure patterns do in fact vary. These studies are evidence that the distribution and origin of household income does have an effect on household expenditure, pointing to weaknesses in the unitary model's assumption of treating the household as one individual.

Furthermore, Becker described the households as a consumption and production unit. He compares the household as a small factory in his household production function. It produces basic commodities and the household try to choose the best combination of these commodities to maximize its utility function. The production of the households depends on both the time available and the available income. The less time the household spends on leisure activities, the higher the household's income. According to Becker, if the salary of one of the household members increases, it changes the incentives to work in the market and the other members will give up their career to spend their time in consumption activities. However in this theory Becker ignored that people can like their job without regardless of the amount of the salary.

Becker also developed a general theory of family behavior for decisions concerning marriage, divorce, children and fertility. According to Becker, parents have to decide how many children they want and how much money and time they are willing to spend on them. Becker thinks that when his income increases the household will focus more on the "quality" of the children and therefore the parents prefer to reduce the number of children. His theory explains the decline in fertility in industrialized countries. Regarding marriage, Becker shows that an individual will decide to marry if the marginal cost of marriage is equal to the marginal income of marriage.

Becker's work has led to a new focus on the analysis of households and their decisions. However, his analysis present some weakness and it lacks theoretical support. First Becker neglects intrahousehold inequality but also the existence of power. The unitary model has been very strongly criticized by feminist economists.

The non-unitary household models developed from the 1990s onwards therefore set out to compensate for the weaknesses of the unitary approach.

== The collective model ==
The basic principles of these models are to characterize the preferences of each individual and to characterize the distribution factors. The collective model, unlike the unitary model, acknowledges the existence of inequalities within the household. More precisely, the model assumes that a household will seek to maximise the weighted average of each members' utilities, where the weights represent each members ability to influence the decision-making process, also known as bargaining power. This means that contrary to the unitary model, any changes in a household member's ability to influence the decision-making process will result in changes to the household's expenditure pattern.

The collective approach was first developed by Pierre-Andre Chiappori (1988) and further developed by Browning and Meghir (1991) and Browning, Bourguignon, Chiappori and Lechene (1994). There are two approach of collective models: cooperative, where household decisions are Pareto efficient, and non-cooperative, based on Nash's equilibrium.

The non-cooperative approach is based on a non-cooperative provision of public goods. Each member has separate economies within the household. The provision of public goods is inefficient. The household members are not able to enter into efficient contract with each other.

In the cooperative approach household decisions are Pareto efficient. The well-being of one household member cannot be increased without reducing the well-being of another member in the same household.

maxUa +μUb μ = pareto weight

Each member has its own preferences and an individual utility function. Under this model, the total income is divided among household members according to a sharing rule and then each member maximizes their utility on their own. The sharing rules are the basis for decisional process.

== See also ==
- Breadwinner model
- Family economics
- Outline of relationships
- Standard budget
- Jacob Mincer
- Grossbard-Shechtman
- Parental dividend
- Human capital
