= Intra-household bargaining =

Negotiations within a household

Intra-household bargaining refers to negotiations that occur between members of a household in order to arrive at decisions regarding the household unit, like whether to spend or save or whether to study or work.

Bargaining is traditionally defined in economic terms as the negotiating conditions of a purchase or contract and is sometimes used in place of direct monetary exchange. In its simplest definition, 'bargaining' is a socio-economic phenomenon involving two parties, who can cooperate towards the creation of a commonly desirable surplus, over whose distribution the parties are in conflict. Bargaining process within a family is one of the important aspects of family economics. Bargaining also plays a role in the functioning and decision making of households, where agreements and decisions do not often have direct monetary values and affect various members of the household.

== Theoretical perspectives ==
=== Common preference models ===
These models consider the household as a single decision-making unit with common preferences, which contrasts with bargaining models that acknowledge individual member preferences.Here, the dominant earner or the head of the household is perceived to act selflessly, prioritizing decisions that cater to the well-being of the entire household. The primary decision-maker's happiness is inherently tied to the welfare of the other members. Critics note that this model may overlook intra-household power disparities and potential inequalities.

=== Altruistic dictator ===
The term "Altruistic Dictator" in the context of Gary Becker's work refers to a theoretical model in household economics where one person, often referred to as a benevolent dictator, controls the household's resources and has altruistic preferences, meaning they care about other family members. This person's utility function includes the preferences of other family members as a normal good. Each household member then maximizes their own preferences subject to their budget constraint set by the benevolent dictator, resulting in the household behaving as one individual.

Becker's model of the altruistic dictator has been used in various economic experiments, such as the dictator game. In this game, one individual (the dictator) decides how to distribute a sum of money between themselves and another person (the recipient). This game is used to study the motivations behind people's decisions to redistribute income to others. Becker's model has been influential in shaping research in the economics of the family, despite some criticism. His approach to the family leads to a conclusion that the institutions depicted are benign, and that government intervention would be useless at best and probably harmful .

In the altruist model of intra-household bargaining, the primary earner or household head is presumed to act altruistically, making decisions that they believe benefit the entire household. This model assumes that the happiness or satisfaction of the altruistic member is intrinsically linked to the well-being of all other members. As a result, resources get distributed based on this member's perception of what benefits the household collectively, which may not always align with individual preferences. However, critics argue that the model might neglect potential intra-household power imbalances and inequalities.

=== Bargaining models of marriage and divorce ===
Bargaining models of divorce focus on the negotiations between spouses during the process of divorce. These models aim to understand how individual preferences, power dynamics, and external factors influence the outcomes of divorce settlements, such as the division of assets, alimony, and child custody arrangements. One example of a bargaining model of divorce is the Nash-bargaining model, which interprets the intra-household allocation of resources as an outcome of bargaining processes among household members, taking into account their individual preferences and outside options. This model can provide valuable insights into the complex dynamics of intra-household resource allocation and decision-making during divorce, capturing the potential influence of individual preferences and bargaining power on divorce outcomes. Another example is the separate spheres bargaining model, which differs from divorce threat bargaining models by considering the distribution of resources within marriage and how it affects the bargaining process during divorce. This model acknowledges that spouses may have different spheres of influence and control over resources within the marriage, which can impact the negotiation process and outcomes during divorce.

Critics of these models argue that they may not fully capture the complexities of divorce negotiations, as they often rely on simplified assumptions about individual preferences and power dynamics. However, bargaining models of divorce can still provide valuable insights into the factors that influence divorce outcomes and help inform policies and interventions aimed at promoting fair and equitable divorce settlements.

=== The Nash-Bargaining Model ===
The Nash-Bargaining Model, as described by McElroy [1990], is a cooperative bargaining model applied to household decision-making. This model is based on the idea that household members negotiate and reach agreements on the allocation of resources, taking into account their individual preferences and outside options Thomas [1990] proposed a test to distinguish between altruism models and the Nash-bargaining model, finding evidence that bargaining may influence allocation within households. In particular, he observed that in households where mothers contribute a larger share of non-labor income, children seem to be better nourished . This suggests that the Nash-bargaining model can provide valuable insights into the complex dynamics of intra-household resource allocation and decision-making, capturing the potential influence of individual preferences and bargaining power on household outcomes. The Nash-bargaining model is considered more realistic than the altruism models as it acknowledges the potential for conflicting interests and preferences among household members. It also allows for the possibility of changes in the distribution of resources within the household based on negotiations between members, rather than assuming a single decision-maker acting in the best interest of the entire household.

=== The Collective Model ===
The Collective Model of household decision-making, as opposed to the unitary model, assumes that each individual in the household has specific preferences, and the outcome of the decision process is Pareto efficient . This model focuses on the individuality of household members and how individual preferences result in a collective decision. The collective approach has been used to provide theoretical results for various household issues, such as labor supply, consumption and savings, household production, and intra-household allocation. The key idea underlying the Collective Model is that household decisions result from a bargaining process among household members, subject to a household budget constraint. This model allows for a more realistic representation of household decision-making, as it acknowledges the potential for conflicting interests and preferences among household members. It also allows for the possibility of changes in the distribution of resources within the household based on negotiations between members, rather than assuming a single decision-maker acting in the best interest of the entire household. The Collective Model has been applied to various household issues and has provided valuable insights into the complex dynamics of intra-household resource allocation and decision-making. However, it's important to note that while the Collective Model provides a more nuanced understanding of household decision-making, it also requires more detailed data on individual preferences and outside options, which may not always be readily available.

=== Types of bargaining ===
Within the household unit and in the mathematical study of game theory, scholars have defined two distinct types of bargaining: cooperative and non-cooperative. In cooperative bargaining models (also called collaborative decision making), the outcomes of negotiations are more equally beneficial to all members of the household, and have therefore been considered a more "natural" means of analyzing the family unit in comparison to Non-cooperative game theory. In non-cooperative bargaining models (also called unitary decision making), personal interests motivate individuals within the household rather than the desire to work in a collaborative manner and maximize the benefit of all household members.

== Household dynamics ==
The household is traditionally described as a single economic unit that "works as a group for its own good", meaning all members of the household contribute in an altruistic manner towards the benefit and functioning of the entire household. The household is "the basic residential unit in which economic production, consumption, inheritance, child rearing, and shelter are organized and carried out". Though it is not always synonymous with family, in the case of intra-household bargaining, in which members of the household are considered to be one unit, the household is generally synonymous.

Because a household is composed of various individuals, conflicts of interest arise. These conflicts of interest make bargaining a necessary part of family life and produce a setting where altruism is not always the guiding principle. These conflicts of interest have the potential to create a spectrum of intra-household dynamics, ranging from a non-cooperative to a cooperative household (which is directly reflective of game theoretic bargaining models). In the non-cooperative model, each household member acts in order to maximize his or her own utility; in the cooperative model, households act as a unit to "maximize the welfare of their members" (described above as altruism).

== Bargaining power ==
Bargaining power is "the relative capacity of each of the parties to a negotiation or dispute to compel or secure agreements on its own terms". In its simplest definition, 'bargaining' is a socio-economic phenomenon involving two parties, who can cooperate towards the creation of a commonly desirable surplus, over whose distribution the parties are in conflict. In other words, "if both parties are on equal footing in a debate, then they will have equal bargaining power", and, conversely, if one party has an advantageous position in the debate, the parties have unequal bargaining power.

More specifically, what determines the equality or inequality of bargaining power is the relative fallback positions or "threat points" of the individuals in the bargaining process; that is, which bargainer has more to lose (economically, socially, etc.)? In the context of intra-household bargaining, an individual's bargaining power and fallback position are defined by one's ability to survive and thrive outside the family.

== Threat point or fallback position ==
The concept of threat point or fallback position is a key component in the field of economics, particularly in the study of household bargaining dynamics. This concept is used to understand the power dynamics within a household, where the individual with a stronger fallback position, or better alternatives, has more bargaining power and influence over decisions. The fallback position refers to the best alternative an individual has if the current cooperative arrangement within the household fails. For instance, a woman with a good income has a stronger fallback position than a woman with no individual earnings. This is because she has better alternatives if the marriage ends, giving her more bargaining power.

In the context of economic society, the concept of threat point or fallback position can be applied to understand the dynamics of power and negotiation within different societal structures, such as households, labor markets, and even countries. It provides a framework for understanding how individuals or groups negotiate and make decisions based on their best alternatives, and how this affects their wellbeing and influence within their respective societal structures.

=== Factors that determine fallback positions ===
==== Extra-household parameters ====
The structural support, whether institutional or societal, an individual has outside of the household determines how capable one would be of surviving outside the household.

- Individual's rights/access to communal resources: Communal resources are entities such as village commons or public forests from which individuals and households alike may acquire resources (e.g., firewood or water) that are necessary for daily subsistence.
- Existence of social support systems (see also social networks): Social support systems are friendship, familial, caste, and any other social groupings from which one derives emotional support, benefiting the individual's overall health and increasing their ability to survive well outside of the household.
- Support from the state and non-governmental organizations (NGOs): State and NGO support could increase an individual's intra-household bargaining power by the creation of a social safety net. The work of states, NGOs, and a social safety net can increase "access to employment, assets, credit, infrastructure, etc.".
- Social norms and "perceptions about needs, contributions, and other determinants of deservedness".The social acceptability (or lack thereof) of leaving the household or living in a non-traditional household, the perceived social needs of individuals within the household, and the low valuation of certain tasks, such as care work, all regulate the bargaining power an individual has within the household, because these factors directly impact the individual's ability to survive outside the household.

=== Individual assets ===
The access one has to individual assets, both economic (such as property, land, wealth, or earning ability) and personal (such as labor), determines fallback position because it is directly linked to one's capability of surviving outside the household.

In South Asian societies land is one of the most valuable individual assets that can increase an individual's bargaining power, yet it is more uncommon and difficult for women to own land than men for a number of reasons: inheritance laws that allow women to inherit land are not strongly enforced, in order to own land individuals must obtain a certain level of education, which women have traditionally not had access to, and owning land and enforcing laws depends upon one's "economic and physical access to legal machinery" as well as access to government officials. Due to the unequal gender rights to land ownership, South Asian women are less capable of providing income to the household which lessens their bargaining power in the household.

In some societies, there is a custom of housewife hidden savings as a counter to inequality.

=== Social norms and gender perceptions ===
Due to the traditional role of women in South Asia as caretakers in the household rather than workers bringing an income to the household, women are not socially perceived as deserving of more opportunities because worth correlates with wealth and not the quality or amount of work one has done.

== Inequalities in bargaining power ==
Unequal access to strong fallback positions creates a situation in which different individuals within the household have more or less bargaining power, and therefore have more or less influence over household decision-making. When considering the factors that determine fallback position in intra-household bargaining and what populations have access to positive fallback positions, Bina Agarwal's research in rural South Asian communities shows that their women have less access to strong bargaining power and their interests are not reflected in household decisions.

== See also ==
- Capability approach
- Cooperative game theory
- Feminist economics
- Feminization of poverty
- Gender inequality
- Shared earning/shared parenting marriage
- Sibling rivalry
- Work–family balance in the United States
