= Devise and bequeath =

Property given by will

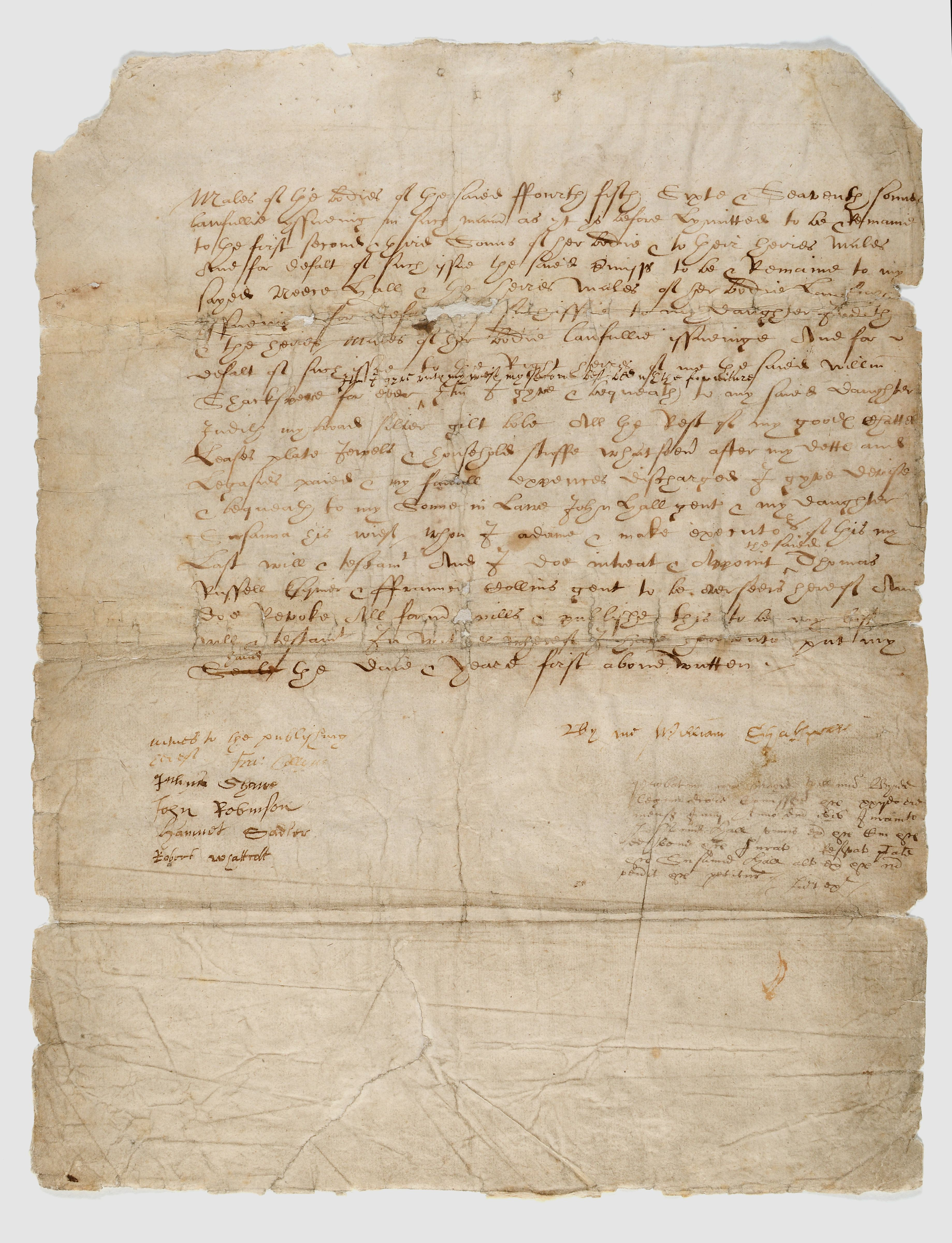
Part of the will of William Shakespeare, which uses "give, device, and bequeath."

A devise is the act of giving property by will, traditionally referring to real property. A bequest is the act of giving property by will, usually referring to personal property. Today, the two words are often used interchangeably due to their combination in many wills as devise and bequeath, a legal doublet. The phrase give, devise, and bequeath, a legal triplet, has been used for centuries, including the will of William Shakespeare.

The word bequeath is a verb form for the act of making a bequest.

== Etymology ==
Bequest comes from Old English becwethan, "to declare or express in words"—cf. "quoth".

== Interpretations ==
Part of the process of probate involves interpreting the instructions in a will. Some wordings that define the scope of a bequest have specific interpretations. "All the estate I own" would involve all of the decedent's possessions at the moment of death.

A conditional bequest is a bequest that will be granted only if a particular event has occurred by the time of its operation. For example, a testator might write in the will that "Mary will receive the house held in trust if she is married" or "if she has children," etc.

An executory bequest is a bequest that will be granted only if a particular event occurs in the future. For example, a testator might write in the will that "Mary will receive the house held in a trust set when she marries" or "when she has children".

In some jurisdictions a bequest can also be a deferred payment, as held in Wolder v. Commissioner, which will impact its tax status.

== Explanations ==
In microeconomics, theorists have engaged the issue of bequest from the perspective of consumption theory, in which they seek to explain the phenomenon in terms of a bequest motive.

== Oudh Bequest ==
The Oudh Bequest is a waqf which led to the gradual transfer of more than six million rupees from the Indian kingdom of Oudh (Awadh) to the Shia holy cities of Najaf and Karbala between 1850 and 1903. The bequest first reached the cities in 1850. It was distributed by two mujtahids, one from each city. The British later gradually took over the bequest and its distribution; according to scholars, they intended to use it as a "power lever" to influence Iranian ulama and Shia.

== American tax law ==
=== Recipients ===
In order to calculate a taxpayer's income tax obligation, the gross income of the taxpayer must be determined. Under Section 61 of the U.S. Internal Revenue Code gross income is "all income from whatever source derived". On its face, the receipt of a bequest would seemingly fall within gross income and thus be subject to tax. However, in other sections of the code, exceptions are made for a variety of things that do not need to be included in gross income. Section 102(a) of the Code makes an exception for bequests stating that "Gross income does not include the value of property acquired by gift, bequest, or inheritance." In general this means that the value or amount of the bequest does not need to be included in a taxpayer's gross income. This rule is not exclusive, however, and there are some exceptions under Section 102(b) of the code where the amount of value must be included. There is great debate about whether or not bequests should be included in gross income and subject to income taxes; however, there has been some type of exclusion for bequests in every Federal Income Tax Act.

=== Donors ===
One reason that the recipient of a bequest is usually not taxed on the bequest is because the donor may be taxed on it. Donors of bequests may be taxed through other mechanisms such as federal wealth transfer taxes. Wealth Transfer taxes, however, are usually imposed against only the very wealthy.
