= Economics of marriage =

The economics of marriage includes the economic analysis of household formation and break up, of production and distribution decisions within the household. It is closely related to the law and economics of marriages and households. Grossbard-Shechtman (1999a and 1999b) identifies three approaches to the subject: the Marxist approach (Friedrich Engels (1884) and Himmelweit and Mohun (1977)), the neo-classical approach (Gary Becker (1974)) and the game theoretic approaches (Marilyn Manser, Murray Brown, Marjorie McElroy and Mary Jane Horney). Marital status has a positive influence on economic status. There is a marriage prime for males that the wage of married males is 15% higher than the wage of never married male. The Uniform Marital Property Act issued clause on the distribution of marital property and individual property. The Uniform Premarital Agreements Act offers clauses to guide two spouses to make an agreement on distribution of rights and obligations before marriage.

== Economic origins of marriage ==
Richard Wrangham puts forward the view that women cooking for men is fundamental to marriage in hunter-gatherer societies.

Many such examples suggest that the mating system is constrained by the way species are socially adapted to their food supply. ... The consequence of man's economic dependence takes different forms in different societies, but recall that according to Jane Collier and Michelle Rosaldo, his needing a wife to provide food is universal among hunter-gatherers. Food, it seems, routinely drives a man's marriage decision more than the need for a sexual partner.

This extends to men stealing women.

Among the Inuit, where a woman contributed no food calories, her cooking and production of warm, dry hunting clothes were vital: a man cannot both hunt and cook. The pressure could drive widowers or bachelors to neighboring territories in an attempt to steal a woman, even if it meant killing her husband. The problem was so pervasive that ... unfamiliar men would normally be killed even before questions were asked. Lust was not the motivation for stealing wives. "The vital importance of a wife to perform domestic services provided the most usual motive for abduction," according to ethnographer David Riches.

Jeremy Greenwood and Nezih Guner (2009) argue that technological progress in the household sector, say due to the advent of dishwashers, frozen foods, vacuum cleaners, washing machines, tupperware, etc. has reduced the need for labor in the home. As a result, it is much easier to live alone. This has resulted in a smaller fraction of the population being married and a higher rate of divorce.

== Legislation and reform of marriage ==
=== Uniform Marital Property Act ===
Traditional asset division system stated that what a spouse owns before marriage or personal earnings during marriage are considered as separated property. Uniform Marital Property（UMPA)，a marital law that was first passed by the Uniform Law Commissioners in 1983, considered a family as an economic entity. Each spouse owns half of the marital property and their individual property, which includes property before marriage and individual income such as gifts from a third person or added value on individual property before marriage. If there is uncertainty on ownership, the property will be considered as a community property. Both spouses have the responsibility to protect their marital property. So far, only Wisconsin has adopted UMPA, and suggestions have been made by which to revise UMPA before it is adopted in any other state.

=== Uniform Premarital Agreements Act ===
Premarital agreement is an agreement that two individuals signed to distribute marital rights and obligations of each individual during marriage, after divorce, or death of one spouse. Uniform Premarital Agreements Act (UPAA) was issued by the Uniform Law Commission (ULC) in 1983 and has been employed by 27 states. It includes rights and duties responsible to determine when and where a premarital agreement is practicable. It requires the premarital agreement to be in writing and signed by both spouses. UPAA also record that a party must fairly disclose his or her property to another party if he or she wants to enforce the premarital agreement. The adoption of UPAA differentiated in each individual states.

| States | Year of Adoption | State-Specific Features |
|---|---|---|
| Arizona | 1991 | Agreement needs to be notarized |
| Arkansas | 1987 | Agreement must be acknowledged by both spouses;parties need to consult with legal counsel before waiving the right to disclosure. |
| California | 1986 | Abandon the allowance of modifying and eliminating spousal support.;Full disclosure of property and financial duties. |
| Connecticut | 1995 | Property includes both tangible and intangible property; agreement does not need to be in writing and signed; added child custody issue; determined how and when agreement is practicable; and "written schedule" |
| Delaware | 1996 | Removes language in section6(b) |
| District of Columbia | 1995 | Allows same-sex couple to have premarital agreement. |
| Florida | 2007 | Spousal support cannot be waived. |
| Hawaii | 1987 | None |
| Idaho | 1995 | Agreement must be acknowledged and proved |
| Illinois | 1990 | Changes for enforcement section; language of the UPPA was changed. |
| Indiana | 1997 | Organization structure;eliminates the fair disclosure on financial and property information the other party; language change |
| Iowa | 1991 | Income and earnings does not consider as property in section 596.1;does not allow using agreement to contract about spousal support. |
| Kansas | 1988 | Added a standard to determine the voluntariness of the agreement. |
| Maine | 1987 | None |
| Montana | 1987 | None |
| Nebraska | 1994 | None |
| Nevada | 1989 | Language changes |
| New Jersey | 1988 | The definition of premarital agreement; Give same-sex couple rights; Signed, acknowledged of agreement by both parties and statement of asset attach to premarital agreement. |
| New Mexico | 1995 | Agreement must be acknowledged in New Mexico;agreement cannot affect the right of child and spousal support; Removed subsection(b) |
| North Carolina | 1987 | language changes in section 52B-7(B) |
| North Dakota | 1985 | definition changes, not need to be in writing; adding new section about handling unconscionable provisions of premarital agreement. |
| Oregon | 1987 | None |
| Rhode Island | 1987 | Word changes enforcement section; insert subsection(b) in 15-17-6 |
| South Dakota | 1989 | No strict limitation on signing and writing the agreement;Delete the modification and elimination of spousal support in agreement. |
| Texas | 1997 | Deleted the modification and elimination of spousal support in agreement. Add subsection to 4.006 |
| Utah | 1994 | Language changes; add protection to child; Word changes in enforcement section. |
| Virginia | 1985 | Change in 20-150(4) allow to contract about child support; Add statement to 20-151(b) financial and property information does not need to be fairly disclosed |

Spier (1992) has pointed out that there may be fewer prenuptial agreements than would be socially optimal. The reason is that if you ask your fiancée to sign such an agreement, you might signal that you fear that the probability of divorce will be larger than your fiancée would have thought otherwise. Smith (2003) provides a survey of the law and economics literature on marriage contracts.

== See also ==
- 4B movement
- Cost of raising a child
- Parental dividend
- Demographic economics
- Economic imperialism (economics)
- Family economics
- Hypergamy
- Partner effects

== Further references ==
- Becker, G. (1974) "A theory of marriage", in: T. W. Schultz, ed., Economics of the family. Chicago: University of Chicago Press, 293–344.
- Engels, F (1884). The Origin of the Family, Private Property, and the State: in the light of the researches of Lewis H. Morgan is a historical materialist treatise.
- Himmelweit, S. and Mohun, S. (1977) “Domestic Labor and Capital.” Cambridge Journal of Economics vol 1:15–31.
- Manser, Marilyn and Murray Brown (1980). "Marriage and Household Decision Making: a Bargaining Analysis." International Economic Review 21:31–44.
- McElroy, Marjorie B. and M.J. Horney (1981). "Nash Bargained Household Decisions: Toward a Generalization of the Theory of Demand." International Economic Review 22:333–49.
