= Jacob Mincer Award =

Economics award

The Jacob Mincer Award
- Awarded for: A lifetime of contributions to the field of labour economics
- Presented by: The Society of Labour Economists
- First award: 2004
- Currently held by: Joseph Altonji (2023)
- Website: www.sole-jole.org/Mincer-Award-Main.html

The Jacob Mincer Award is an economic award issued by the Society of Labour Economists (SOLE) honouring lifetime contributions to the field of labour economics.

Initially named the "Career Achievement Award for Lifetime Contributions to the Field of Labor Economics", the prize was first awarded to Jacob Mincer and Gary Becker in 2004, and was subsequently known as the "Mincer Award"". The award is to be presented annually, provided a suitable nominee is found, by a committee appointed by the society President and approved by the Executive Board.

Four winners of the Jacob Mincer Award have also been awarded the Nobel Memorial Prize in Economic Sciences.

== Recipients ==
Year	Image	Recipient	Country	Ph.D. alma mater	Institution (most significant tenure/at time of receipt)
2004		Jacob Mincer	United States	Columbia University	Columbia University
2004		Gary Becker	United States	University of Chicago	University of Chicago
2005		Orley Ashenfelter	United States	Princeton University	Princeton University
2005		James Heckman	United States	Princeton University	University of Chicago
2006		Richard Freeman	United States	Harvard University	Harvard University
2006		Edward Lazear	United States	Harvard University	Stanford University
2007		Dale Mortensen	United States	Carnegie Mellon University	Northwestern University
2007		Finis Welch	United States	University of Chicago	Texas A&M University
2008		Reuben Gronau	Israel	Columbia University	Hebrew University of Jerusalem
2008		John Pencavel	United Kingdom	Princeton University	Stanford University
2009		Claudia Goldin	United States	University of Chicago	Harvard University
2009		Yoram Weiss	Israel	Stanford University	Tel Aviv University
2011		Ronald Ehrenberg	United States	Northwestern University	Cornell University
2013		Daniel Hamermesh	United States	Yale University	University of Texas, Austin
2015		Robert Willis	United States	University of Washington	University of Michigan
2017		Francine Blau	United States	Harvard University	Cornell University
2018		Henry Farber	United States	Princeton University	Princeton University
2019		David Card	Canada	Princeton University	University of California, Berkeley
2020		Richard Blundell	United Kingdom	N/A	University College London
2021		Kenneth Wolpin	United States		University of Pennsylvania
2022		Lawrence F. Katz	United States	Massachusetts Institute of Technology	Harvard University
2023		Joseph Altonji	United States	Princeton University	Yale University
2024		Janet Currie	United States	Princeton University	Princeton University
2025		John Bound	United States	Harvard University	University of Michigan
2026		Shelly Lundberg	Canada	Northwestern University	University of California, Santa Barbara
