= Review of Economics of the Household =

- Discipline: Economics
- Language: English
- Edited by: Shoshana Grossbard

Publication details
- History: 2003-present
- Publisher: Springer Science+Business Media
- Frequency: Quarterly
- Impact factor: 1.184 (2018)

Standard abbreviations
- ISO 4: Rev. Econ. Househ.

Indexing
- ISSN: 1569-5239 (print); 1573-7152 (web)
- LCCN: 2007209324
- OCLC no.: 300197795

Links
- Journal homepage; Online access

The Review of Economics of the Household is a peer-reviewed academic journal established in 2001 by Shoshana Grossbard and first published in 2003. It publishes empirical and theoretical research on the economic behavior and decision-making processes of single and multi-person households. Household decisions analyzed in this journal include consumption, savings, labor supply and other time uses, marriage and divorce, demand for health and other forms of human capital, fertility and investment in children's human capital, households and environmental economics, economics of migration, and economics of religion. The journal is particularly interested in policy-relevant economic analyses of the effects of policy instruments on household decisions. Even though its focus is on micro-level applications, it also covers macro-economic applications and research on economic development. Review articles pertaining to household economics are published in the Perspectives section.

The Review is not wedded to any particular set of models or methods, but encourages high-quality research using a variety of approaches as well as communication and interactions among researchers specialized in the economic analysis of various household decisions and from multiple perspectives. The original advisory board included Gary Becker and Jacob Mincer, the founders of the Columbia School of Household Economics often called the New Home Economics, as well as another Nobel prize winner, Clive Granger. Michael Grossman served as co-editor for more than 10 years.

The journal is ABSTRACTED/INDEXED in Social Science Citation Index, Journal Citation Reports/Social Sciences Edition, SCOPUS, EBSCO EconLit with Full Text, Google Scholar, EBSCO Health Business, AGRICOLA, Current Contents / Social & Behavioral Sciences, EBSCO Business Source, EBSCO Discovery Service, EBSCO TOC Premier, ECONIS, Expanded Academic, Gale, Gale Academic OneFile, Gale InfoTrac, OCLC WorldCat Discovery Service, ProQuest ABI/INFORM, ProQuest Business Premium Collection, ProQuest Central, ProQuest Health Management Database, ProQuest Health Research Premium Collection, ProQuest Pharma Collection, ProQuest-ExLibris Primo, ProQuest-ExLibris Summon, Research Papers in Economics (RePEc)
