= Household production function =

Consumers often choose not directly from the commodities that they purchase, but from commodities they transform into goods through a household production function. It is these goods that they value. The idea was originally proposed by Gary Becker, Kelvin Lancaster, and Richard Muth in the mid-1960s. The idea was introduced simultaneously into macroeconomics in two separate papers by Jess Benhabib, Richard Rogerson, and Randall Wright (1991); and Jeremy Greenwood and Zvi Hercowitz (1991). Household production theory has been used to explain the rise in married female labor-force participation over the course of the 20th century, as the result of labor-saving appliances. More recently with the rise of the DIY or Maker movement household production has become more sophisticated. For example, consumers can now convert plastic wire into high-value products with inexpensive 3-D printers in their own homes.

== Example ==
A simple example of this is baking a cake. The consumer purchases flour, eggs, and sugar and then uses labor, know-how, time and other resources producing a cake. The consumer did not really want the flour, sugar, or eggs, but purchased them to produce the cake for consumption (instead of buying it, e.g., from a bakery).

== See also ==
- Family economics
- New Home Economics
