= Shoshana Grossbard =

Economist

- Born: October 23, 1948 (age 77)
- Other names: Shoshana Grossbard-Shechtman, Amyra Grossbard-Shechtman, Amyra Grossbard

Academic background
- Education: University of Chicago
- Doctoral advisor: Gary Becker, James Heckman

Academic work
- Discipline: Economics
- Institutions: San Diego State University
- Notable ideas: Work-In-Household (WiHo), analysis of sex ratio effects on intra-household distribution

Shoshana Grossbard (born October 23, 1948; also known as Shoshana Grossbard-Shechtman, Amyra Grossbard-Shechtman, and Amyra Grossbard) is an American economist and professor of economics emerita at San Diego State University. She is also a member of the Family Inequality Network, HCEO, University of Chicago and a research fellow at the Institute for the Study of Labor and the CESifo Institute. She is a founder of two organizations related to household economics: a journal, the Review of Economics of the Household founded in 2001 (she remains its editor in chief) and the Society of Economics of the Household. The Society (SEHO) holds annual meetings since 2017.

The main focus of Grossbard's research is household economics, family economics and economics of marriage. A student of Gary Becker and James Heckman at the University of Chicago and of Jacob Mincer, she was one of the first economists to enter this research area. In her theoretical approach she views marriages and cohabitating couples as firms, with spouses possibly hiring each other's work in household production, which she calls "Work-In-Household (WiHo)". To the extent that husbands employ their wives' WiHo and pay them a low "quasi-wage" women can be considered as being exploited by their husbands, as claimed by Marxist-feminist economists. As are workers and firms in standard models of labor markets in her models spouses are interacting in a non-cooperative way.

Legal ownership of the household is a question related to the analysis of marriages as firms. Robert Ellickson has argued that owners of the household's capital should have more influence on decision-making related to the household than those who work in the household's production. In contrast, Grossbard has proposed that those doing the household's production should have more control over decisions than owners of the household's capital.

Grossbard is one of the first social scientists to have analyzed consequences of gender imbalance in sex ratio for intra-household distribution, labor supply, fertility and cohabitation. She has shown that variation in sex ratio over time is inversely related to married women's labor supply in the U.S.

== Selected publications ==
- Grossbard, S. (2015). The Marriage Motive: A Price Theory of Marriage. How Marriage Markets Affect Employment, Consumption and Savings. Springer. ISBN 978-1-4614-1622-7
- Grossbard-Shechtman, Shoshana (2003). Marriage and the economy: theory and evidence from advanced industrial societies. Cambridge University Press. ISBN 0-521-89143-4.
- Grossbard-Shechtman, Shoshana (1999). "Marriage" in Encyclopedia of Political Economy, edited by Phillip O'Hara. London: Routledge
- Grossbard-Shechtman, Shoshana (1993). On the economics of marriage: a theory of marriage, labor, and divorce. Boulder: Westview Press. ISBN 0-8133-8527-X.
- Grossbard-Shechtman, A. (1984). "A theory of allocation of time in markets for labour and marriage", Economic Journal, 94:863-882. JSTOR 2232300

== See also ==
- Parental dividend
