= Kevin M. Murphy =

American economist

- Born: 1958 (age 67–68)

Academic background
- Education: University of California, Los Angeles (BA); University of Chicago (PhD)
- Doctoral advisor: Sherwin Rosen
- Influences: Armen Alchian; Gary Becker

Academic work
- Discipline: Social economics
- School or tradition: Chicago School of Economics
- Institutions: University of Chicago
- Doctoral students: Luis Garicano
- Awards: John Bates Clark Medal (1997); MacArthur Fellows Program (2005); John von Neumann Award (2008)
- Website: Information at IDEAS / RePEc

Kevin Miles Murphy (born 1958) is the George J. Stigler Distinguished Service Professor of Economics at the University of Chicago Booth School of Business and a Senior Fellow at the Hoover Institution.

== Education ==
Murphy has a B.A. (economics, Phi Beta Kappa), from the University of California, Los Angeles, 1981; and PhD, University of Chicago, 1986 (thesis: Specialization and Human Capital).

== Career ==
In 1997 Murphy was awarded the prestigious John Bates Clark Medal by the American Economic Association, given once every two years to the most outstanding American economist under the age of forty, and widely considered to be the second most prestigious prize in economics (after the Nobel Prize in Economics). Murphy was cited for his study of the causes of growing income inequality between white-collar and blue-collar workers in the United States and his research linking the growth in income inequality to growth in the demand for skilled labor. His other research has covered such topics as economic growth, income inequality, valuing medical research, rational addiction, and unemployment.

Murphy has authored over 50 published articles on a variety of topics including a cost–benefit analysis of the war in Iraq.

On September 20, 2005, he was named as one of the 2005 recipients of the MacArthur Fellowship, often referred to as the "genius grant."

On November 13, 2023, Murphy, while serving as an expert witness for Google during a trial, disclosed that Apple gets 36% of the revenue Google generates from being the default browser on the Safari browser.

== Major works ==
- Measuring the Gains from Medical Research: An Economic Approach (edited volume with Robert H. Topel) University of Chicago Press, 2003.
- Social Economics: Market Behavior in a Social Environment (with Gary S. Becker). Cambridge, MA : Harvard University Press (The Belknap Press), 2000.
