= Michael Grossman (economist) =

American economist

Michael Grossman (born 1942) is an American health economist and economics professor emeritus at the City University of New York Graduate Center (CUNY). He directed the Health Economics Program at the National Bureau of Economic Research (NBER) from 1972 to 2020. Grossman was an early contributor to New Home Economics (NHE).

Grossman received his bachelor's degree from Trinity College in Hartford, Connecticut in 1964. He received his doctorate in economics from Columbia University in 1970. In 1966, Grossman was hired as a research assistant by Victor Fuchs at NBER. In 1972, he was hired by CUNY as a visiting assistant professor. He earned his professorship in 1978 and in 1988 became Distinguished Professor of Economics. From 1983 to 1995, he chaired the university's doctoral economics program.

Grossman was co-editor of the Review of Economics of the Household from 2005 to 2017, and was the inaugural recipient of the Victor Fuchs Award for Lifetime Contributions to the Field of Health Economics, presented by the American Society of Health Economists in 2008. His 1972 model of health production has been extremely influential in health economics. Grossman's work on health economics was inspired by his professors Gary Becker and Jacob Mincer, the founders of the New Home Economics. Grossman has argued for a causal relationship between schooling and health.
