= Reuben Gronau =

Israeli economist

- ראובן גרונאו
- Born: 1937 (age 88–89)

Academic background
- Education: Columbia University; Hebrew University of Jerusalem
- Doctoral advisor: Jacob Mincer; Gary Becker

Academic work
- Discipline: Economic sociology Labour economics
- Institutions: Hebrew University of Jerusalem
- Awards: Jacob Mincer Award (2008)
- Website: Information at IDEAS / RePEc

Reuben Gronau (Hebrew: ראובן גרונאו; born 1937) is an Israeli economist, notable for his contributions to labour economics and economic sociology, in particular the Gronau model of time allocation and home production.

== Biography ==
Reuven Gronau was born in Tel Aviv.

He studied economics at the Hebrew University and received his bachelor's and master's degrees in 1960 and 1963. He continued his studies at Columbia University and in 1967 received a Ph.D. in economics under supervision of Jacob Mincer and Gary Becker, with a thesis on transport economics.

In 1967 he joined the faculty of the Hebrew University in the Economics Department, and in 1979 was appointed a full professor.

In 2005, Gronau was awarded the Michael Landau Prize in Israeli Economics by the Council for the Study of Israel and Zionist History.
