= John Pencavel =

English economist

Academic background
- Education: University College London; Princeton University
- Influences: John Spraos; Albert Rees

Academic work
- Discipline: Econometrics; Labour economics
- Institutions: Stanford University
- Awards: Jacob Mincer Award (2008)
- Website: Information at IDEAS / RePEc

John H. Pencavel is a British economist and academic, currently serving as Levin Professor of Economics (Emeritus) at Stanford University, having been at the institution since 1969. He is a Fellow of the Econometric Society (1993), Fellow of University College London (2001), Fellow of the Society of Labor Economists (2004), and Distinguished Fellow of the American Economic Association.

== Career ==
Pencavel grew up in Hanwell, West London, attending Drayton Manor Grammar School. He then went on to read Economics at University College London, gaining both a BSc (1965) and MSc (1966), before receiving his PhD from Princeton University in 1969.

In 2005, he was made President of the Society of Labor Economists, and in 2014 was made President of the Western Economic Association.

Pencavel's major contributions lie within labour economics, focussing on behavioural models of trade unions, and modelling worker cooperatives. Pencavel is also the creator of the JEL Classification System, used in an amended form by the AEA to this day.

=== Awards ===
Pencavel was awarded a Guggenheim Fellowship in 1978, and the Jacob Mincer Award for lifetime contributions to labour economics in 2008.
