= Rational addiction =

Addiction modeled as economically rational form of consumption

In behavioral economics, rational addiction is the hypothesis that addictions can be usefully modeled as specific kinds of rational, forward-looking, optimal consumption plans. The canonical theory comes from work done by Kevin M. Murphy and Gary Becker.

== Economic theory ==
Though controversial, this theoretical approach has become "one of the standard models in the literature on addictive behavior" in economics, and a variety of extensions and modifications have been developed and published by other authors over the years. A survey of researchers who had authored or co-authored peer-reviewed articles on rational addiction theory indicates that the researchers see the theories as successful in a number of ways: 73 percent of the respondents see them as extending and enriching consumer theory, 56 percent see them as containing relevant insights on the welfare effects of addictive goods and public policies towards these, 44 percent see them as providing useful tools for predicting aggregate consumption behavior, 39 percent see them as providing insights into how addicts choose that are relevant for treatment professionals, and 27 percent see them as providing evidence that addictions are actually a sequence of rational, welfare maximizing choices.

== Implementation ==
The original theory models addictions as the implementation of a forward-looking consumption plan made under full certainty and perfect information, where the individual is entirely committed toward maximizing utility. Addiction is defined in a non-physiological sense as a causal effect of past consumption on current consumption, so that addictiveness is specific to individuals. The addict knows exactly how the good will affect him, and the reason he consumes more and more ("gets hooked") is that this is the pattern of consumption that maximizes his discounted utility. He knows that consuming the addictive good will change his preferences, altering both his future baseline level of utility and the marginal utility of consuming the addictive good in the future.

A sizeable econometric literature has developed on rational addiction, often reporting evidence in favor of rational addiction. For example, Jonathan Gruber and Botond Köszegi (2001) show that the model's prediction that announced future tax increases should decrease current smoking is consistent with the evidence. Christopher Auld and Paul Grootendorst (2004) show, however, that the empirical version of the rational addiction model tends to produce spurious evidence of addictiveness when aggregate data are used.

== Criticism ==
Research attempting to apply the rational addiction model to surveys of drug users have found the model inadequate to explain drug-taking behavior.

Criticism of rational addiction theories have emerged along different lines. A prominent critic is the philosopher Jon Elster, who in a series of writings has claimed that theories in Becker's framework are conceptually incoherent in their view of preferences, as well as inconsistent with the ambivalence and desire for increased self-regulation that is empirically displayed by many addicts. The economist Ole Rogeberg has commented that this all "illustrate how absurd choice theories in economics get taken seriously as possibly true explanations and tools for welfare analysis despite being poorly interpreted, empirically unfalsifiable, and based on wildly inaccurate assumptions selectively justified by ad hoc stories."
