= Child tax credit =

Tax credit for parents with children

A child tax credit (CTC) is a tax credit for parents with dependent children given by various countries. The credit is often linked to the number of dependent children a taxpayer has and sometimes the taxpayer's income level. For example, with the Child Tax Credit in the United States, only families making less than $400,000 per year may claim the full CTC. Similarly, in the United Kingdom, the tax credit was only available for families making less than £42,000 per year.

== Germany ==
Germany has a programme called the Kinderfreibetrag which, despite technically being a tax exemption and not a tax credit, functions similarly. The child allowance is an allowance in German tax law, in which a certain amount of money is tax-free in the taxation of parents. In the income tax fee paid, child benefit and tax savings through the child tax credit are compared against each other, and the parents pay whichever results in the lesser amount of tax.

== United Kingdom ==
In the United Kingdom, a family with children and an income below about £32,200 could until April 2025 claim the child tax credit on top of child benefit. Though referred to as a "tax credit", receipt of the payment was not connected with or conditional upon the amount of tax a person paid; it was more akin to a welfare payment. Higher rates were paid for disabled children. It was integrated with the Working Tax Credit, which also provided support for childcare costs.

All taxable income was tested for the credit, so a couple who both worked and had children had both salaries taken into account. Tax Credits could be capped, and it was claimed that this could affect the poorest families disproportionately. On Monday 26 October 2015, the House of Lords voted for opposition Labour Party proposals to provide financial redress to those affected by reduced entitlements.

Since 2018 Child Tax Credit has been replaced by Universal Credit for most people. UK citizens may claim Child Benefit which is paid out by the UK tax authority HMRC and anyone earning less than £60,000 year can receive the full benefit. Anyone earning between £60,000 and £80,000 per year pays a percentage of their benefit back in tax, and those earning £80,000 or more per year pay the full amount back.

The Child Tax Credit and Working Tax Credit schemes closed on 5 April 2025. No further Tax Credit payments were made and all claimants had to migrate to Universal Credit.

== United States ==
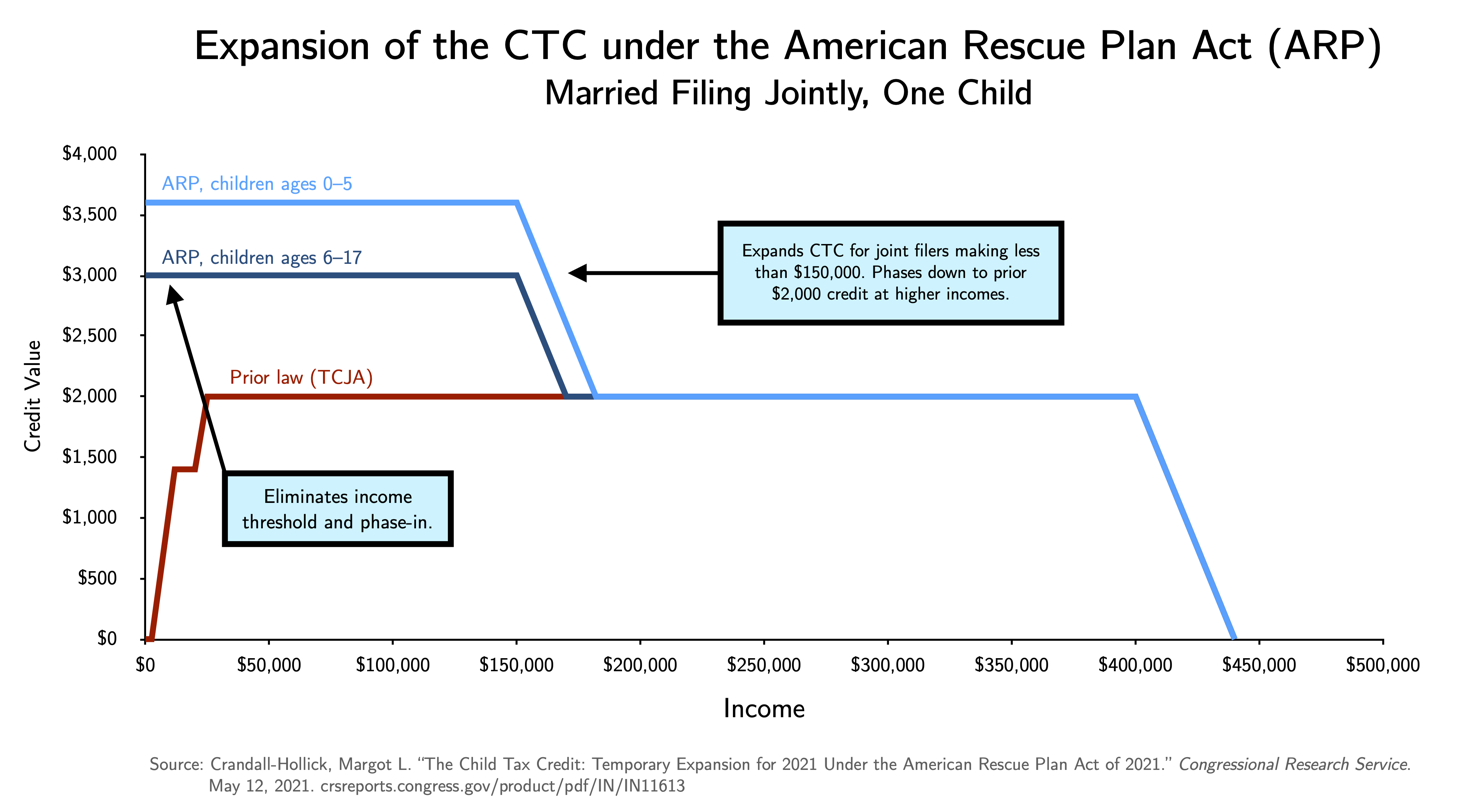
Comparison of the expanded CTC and the CTC under the Tax and Jobs Act of 2017 for a married couple filing jointly (depicts amount of credit per child)

The child tax credit is available to taxpayers who have children under the age of 17 (or in 2021 under the age of 18). Since 2018, the CTC is $2,000 per qualifying child. It is available in full to single filers who make up to $200,000 and married couples filing jointly who make up to $400,000. Above these limits, the CTC is phased out at the rate of $50 for each additional $1,000 earned. When a taxpayer's credit value exceeds his or her tax liability, the taxpayer is eligible for the additional child tax credit (ACTC), which is calculated as 15% of the taxpayer's AGI in excess of $2,500 (i.e. a family must make at least $2,500 to be eligible for the credit), with the refund value capped at $1,400.

The American Rescue Plan Act (ARP) of 2021 significantly expanded the child tax credit for one year, allowing qualifying families to offset $3,000 per child up to age 17 and $3,600 per child under age 6. It also made the credit fully-refundable and offered the option of receiving half of the credit as six monthly payments. 39 million households, covering 88% of children in the United States, will begin receiving these payments automatically beginning July 15, 2021. The proposed Build Back Better Act would extend the expansion for an additional year and make the full refundability of the CTC permanent.

The child tax credit has a significant effect on child poverty. In 2016, it was estimated to have lifted about 3 million children out of poverty. In 2021, a Columbia University study estimated that the expansion of the CTC in the American Rescue Plan Act reduced child poverty by an additional 26%, and would have decreased child poverty by 40% had all eligible households claimed the credit.

== See also ==
- Parental dividend
- Taxation in the United Kingdom
- UK labour law
- Taxation in the United States
