= Theory of the second best =

Branch of economics studying next-best alternatives

In welfare economics, the theory of the second best concerns the situation when one or more optimality conditions cannot be satisfied. The economists Richard Lipsey and Kelvin Lancaster showed in 1956 that if one optimality condition in an economic model cannot be satisfied, it is possible that the next-best solution involves changing other variables away from the values that would otherwise be optimal. Politically, the theory implies that if it is infeasible to remove a particular market distortion, introducing one or more additional market distortions in an interdependent market may partially counteract the first, and lead to a more efficient outcome.

== Implications ==
In an economy with some uncorrectable market failure in one sector, actions to correct market failures in another related sector with the intent of increasing economic efficiency may actually decrease overall economic efficiency. In theory, at least, it may be better to let two market imperfections cancel each other out rather than making an effort to fix either one. Thus, it may be optimal for the government to intervene in a way that is contrary to usual policy. This suggests that economists need to study the details of the situation before jumping to the theory-based conclusion that an improvement in market perfection in one area implies a global improvement in efficiency.

== Application ==
Even though the theory of the second best was developed for the Walrasian general equilibrium system, it also applies to partial equilibrium cases.

== Common misinterpretation ==
A common misinterpretation of the theory, sometimes termed the fallacy of exhaustive effort, is the assumption that when one optimality condition cannot be satisfied, satisfying as many of the remaining conditions as possible must yield the second-best outcome. The theory of the second best demonstrates the opposite: because optimality conditions are typically derived from an interdependent system, perturbing one condition alters the marginal trade-offs throughout the entire system, so the second-best optimum generally requires violating all remaining conditions as well.

This misinterpretation is related to piecemeal social engineering and contrasts with the holistic policy design that the theory prescribes. In practice, the error arises when policymakers treat the individual conditions for a first-best outcome as separately desirable goals—for example, liberalising trade while ignoring an environmental externality because "free trade is good," or deregulating markets while assuming away imperfect information because "competition is good." Each such prescription satisfies one condition from the first-best list, but without the others in place, it can reduce welfare relative to doing nothing at all.
