= Ronald G. Ehrenberg =

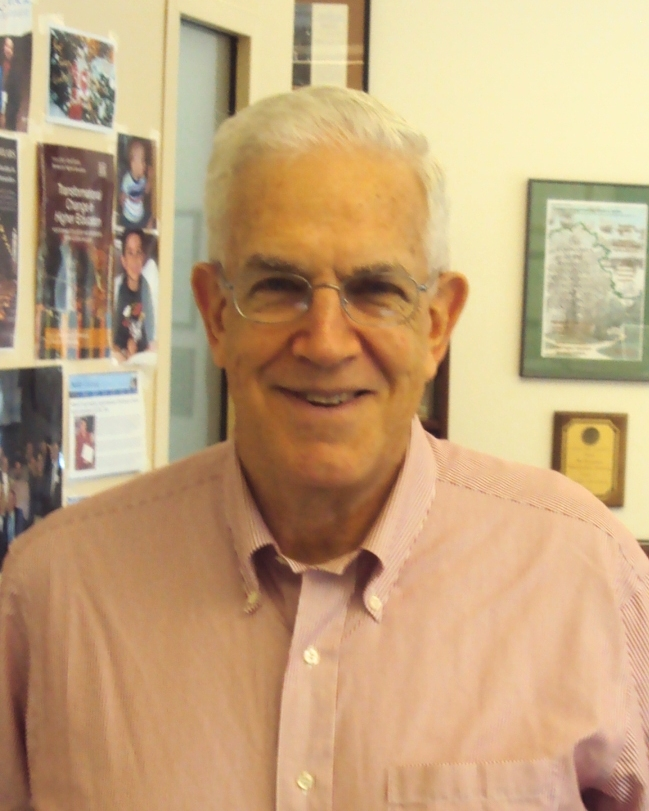
- Born: April 20, 1946 (age 80); New York, NY

Academic background
- Education: Binghamton University; Northwestern University

Academic work
- Discipline: Labor Economics
- Institutions: Loyola University; University of Massachusetts - Amherst; Cornell University
- Notable ideas: Labor economics including economics of higher education
- Website: Information at IDEAS / RePEc

Ronald Gordon Ehrenberg is an American economist. He has primarily worked in the field of labor economics including the economics of higher education. He is Irving M. Ives Professor of Industrial and Labor Relations and Economics Emeritus at the New York State School of Industrial and Labor Relations at Cornell University. He is the founder-director of the Cornell Higher Education Research Institute (CHERI) and a member of the National Academy of Education.

== Biography ==
Ehrenberg received a B.A. in mathematics from Harpur College (now Binghamton University) in 1966, an M.A. and a Ph.D. in economics from Northwestern University in 1970. After teaching at Loyola University and University of Massachusetts Amherst, he moved to Ithaca in 1975 and spent rest of his professional career at Cornell University.

At Cornell, Ehrenberg is a faculty member in the department of labor economics in the School of Industrial and Labor Relations and in the department of economics in the College of Arts and Sciences. He also served as the university's vice president for Academic Programs, Planning and Budgeting (1995–1998) and an elected member of the Cornell Board of Trustees (2006–10). In 2005, he was named a Stephen H. Weiss Presidential Fellow, the highest award for undergraduate teaching that exists at Cornell.

== Professional activities ==
Ehrenberg's academic contributions have been primarily in the field of labor economics including the economics of higher education. He has authored or edited (sometimes with coauthors) over 30 books and book-length reports. He has published over 160 articles in professional journals.

Ehrenberg has served as a member of the Board of Trustees of the State University of New York from 2010 to 2017 (SUNY).

=== Labor Economics ===
Ehrenberg was the founding editor of "Research in Labor Economics" and served as a co-editor of the Journal of Human Resources. He is a research associate at the National Bureau of Economic Research and a research fellow at IZA (berlin). He is a Past President and a Fellow of the Society of Labor Economists. He is a Fellow of the Labor and Employment Relations Association and a National Associate of the National Academies of Science and Engineering.

He coauthored with Robert S. Smith a leading textbook, Modern Labor Economics: Theory and Public Policy (2017, 13th edition).

=== Economics of Higher Education ===
Ehrenberg's more recent research has focused on higher education issues. In 1998, Ehrenberg founded Cornell Higher Education Research Institute (CHERI) to provide a vehicle for interdisciplinary research on higher education.

CHERI's current research interests include "the implications of the growing dispersion of wealth across academic institutions, the growing costs and importance of science to universities, the financial challenges facing public higher education, the changing nature of the faculty, governance in academic institutions, improving PhD programs in the humanities and associated social sciences, improving persistence rates in STEM Field majors, and reducing inequality in access to higher education."

Ehrenberg is a Fellow of the American Educational Research Association and a fellow emeritus of the TIAA-CREF Institute.

== Awards and honors ==
Ehrenberg has received numerous academic honors and professional distinctions. He received an Honorary Doctor of Science from Binghamton University State University of New York in 2008. He was a commencement speaker at Pennsylvania State University's 2011 Commencement during which he received an Honorary Doctor of Humane Letters from the university. The Binghamton University Alumni Association gave him Glenn G. Bartle Distinguished Alumnus/a Award in 2015.

He was awarded the Society of Labor Economists' 2011 Jacob Mincer Lifetime Achievement Award and the Association for the Study of Higher Education's 2013 Howard Bowen Distinguished Career Award.

Cornell University honored him in 2014 by creating the Ronald G. Ehrenberg Professorship in Labor Economics position at the university. In April 2018 he was named a recipient of the SUNY Chancellor's Award for Excellence in Faculty Service.

A conference entitled "Ron Ehrenberg: His Life and Economics" organized by his former students was held on June 3–4 at the ILR Conference Center in King-Shaw Hall, Cornell University. A conference volume "Ron Ehrenberg: His Life and Economics" provides conference details, a biography, a list of doctoral students, a series of articles and photographs offering tributes, five essays by Ehrenberg ("My Life and Economics," "Last Lecture," "Being a Quadruple Threat Keeps it Interesting," "Coauthors and Collaborations," and "Involving Undergraduates in Research to Encourage Them to Undertake Ph.D. Study in Economics"), and a "List of Completed Articles & Books by Ronald G. Ehrenberg."

== Selected publications ==
- R. G. Ehrenberg (editor), American University: National Treasure or Endangered Species, Cornell University Press, 1997.
- R. G. Ehrenberg, Tuition Rising: Why College Costs So Much, Harvard University Press, 2002.
- R. G. Ehrenberg (editor), Governing Academia, Cornell University Press, 2004.
- R. G. Ehrenberg, What’s Happening to Public Higher Education? Johns Hopkins University Press, 2007.
- P. E. Stephan and R. G. Ehrenberg (editors), Science and the University, University of Wisconsin Press, 2007.
- R. G. Ehrenberg, Doctoral Education and the Faculty of the Future, Cornell University Press, 2008.
- R. G. Ehrenberg, H. Zuckerman, J. A. Groen, and S. M. Brucker, Educating Scholars: Doctoral Education in the Humanities, Princeton University Press, 2010.
