= Barry Chiswick =

American economist

Barry Raymond Chiswick, born in 1942, is an American economist and professor of economics at the Columbian College of Arts and Sciences, George Washington University. He has done extensive research on labor economics, human resources and income distribution. His "fundamental contributions to the economic analysis of migration" were rewarded with the IZA Prize in Labor Economics in 2011, with George J. Borjas as co-recipient.

== Education ==
Barry Chiswick received his BA in economics from Brooklyn College in 1962 before obtaining his MA and Doctor of Philosophy in economics from Columbia University in 1964 and 1967, respectively.

== Academic career ==
Chiswick joined the University of California, Los Angeles as assistant professor of economics in 1966, gaining tenure as associate professor in 1970, but was on leave at Columbia University from 1969 to 1971. In 1971 Chiswick moved to the City University of New York as a tenured associate professor of economics, being promoted to full professor in 1975. Thereafter, he changed to the University of Illinois at Chicago (UIC) in 1978, where he worked as tenured research professor first in economics and after 1998 also in sociology until December 2010, becoming a UIC distinguished professor in 2002. At UIC, Chiswick headed the department of economics (1997–2008), directed the new center for economic education (2000–2010) and became an affiliate of the department of Germanic studies (2000–2010). He started work as the professor of economics at George Washington University in January 2011. He still remains professor emeritus at the UIC.

Throughout his academic research career Chiswick has been affiliated with the National Bureau of Economic Research, first as research analyst (1965–1967) and later as research associate (1970–1973), and served in various public positions, including the Council of Economic Advisers (1973–1977). He has also held numerous positions as visiting professor or scholar, for example at the American Enterprise Institute, the Hoover Institution, the University of Chicago, Princeton University, the University of Haifa, Hebrew University of Jerusalem, Tel Aviv University, and the Ben-Gurion University.

Furthermore, Chiswick held editorial responsibilities at several academic journals, namely the Journal of Population Economics, the Review of Economics of the Household, the Quarterly Review of Economics and Finance, Contemporary Jewry, the International Migration Review, and European Research Studies.

== Research ==
Chiswick's fields of interest include labor economics and human resources, immigration, language, and minorities, the economics of religion, economic theory, statistics and applied econometrics, and public policy analysis.
