= Richard Lipsey =

Canadian academic and economist

- Born: Richard George Lipsey; August 28, 1928 (age 97); Victoria, British Columbia, Canada
- Occupation: Economist
- Spouses: Assia Gutmann (m. 1952, divorced) Diana Lipsey née Smart (m. 1961–2021)
- Awards: Order of Canada, Fellow of the Royal Society of Canada, Social Sciences and Humanities Research Council of Canada Gold Medal for Lifetime Achievement

Richard George Lipsey, OC FRSC (born August 28, 1928) is a Canadian academic and economist. He is best known for his work on the economics of the second-best, a theory that demonstrated that piecemeal establishing of individual first best conditions would not necessarily raise welfare in a situation in which all first best conditions could not be satisfied, an article that he co-authored with Kelvin Lancaster. He is currently Professor Emeritus of Economics at Simon Fraser University.

== Early life and education ==
Born in Victoria, British Columbia, he received a Bachelor of Arts degree in 1951 from the University of British Columbia, a Master of Arts degree in 1953 from the University of Toronto, and a Ph.D. in 1956 from the London School of Economics, where he studied under thesis director and future Nobel Prize winner James Meade.

== Career ==
From 1955 to 1963, he held the positions of assistant lecturer, lecturer, reader and professor at the London School of Economics. From 1963 to 1969, he was a Professor of Economics, Chairman of the Economics Department, and Dean of the School of Social Studies at the University of Essex in England.

Returning to Canada, he held a brief position as a visiting professor at the University of British Columbia, before being appointed the Sir Edward Robert Peacock professor of economics at Queen's University in Kingston, Ontario in 1970.

He was the Irving Fisher Visiting Professor at Yale University from 1979 to 1980. From 1983 to 1989, he was a Senior Economic Advisor at the C.D. Howe Institute, the economic and social think tank in Toronto. In 1989, he was appointed Professor of Economics at Simon Fraser University and later became professor emeritus.

He is also a co-founder of Simon Fraser University's ACT (Adaptation to Climate Change Team), an initiative that works to assist effective adaptation to climate-related challenges through policy development and awareness-raising.

== Works ==
Lipsey wrote the econometric follow up article to William Phillips' original article that introduced the curve that became known as the Phillips curve, which held that a tradeoff existed between unemployment and inflation. At the 1968 American Economic Association meetings Milton Friedman countered Lipsey's and Phillips' arguments in what was perhaps one of the great arguments in economics. Recently Lipsey co-edited with William Scarth a three volume compilation of many of the most important articles on the Phillips curve.

He is also the author or co-author of several economics textbooks including a book on positive economics (Economics published by Oxford University Press in its 14th edition in March 2020 with Alec Chrystal as co-author).

His book on growth, co-authored with Kenneth Carlaw and Clifford Bekar, Economic Transformations: General Purpose Technologies and Long Term Economic Growth won the 2006 Schumpeter Prize for the best writing on evolutionary economics over the previous two years.

He was co-author, with Gordon R. Sparks and Peter O. Steiner, of Economics, a standard Canadian university textbook and now co-authored with Christopher Ragan.

== Recognition ==
He is an Officer of the Order of Canada and a Fellow of the Royal Society of Canada and the Econometric Society. In 2005, he won the gold medal for achievement in research from the Social Sciences and Humanities Research Council of Canada.

== Personal life ==
Lipsey was the second husband of Assia Gutmann (later Wevill); they had met while she was enrolled in the University of British Columbia, Vancouver. They married in 1952 and later divorced.
