= Housewife hidden savings =

Housewife hidden savings is a type of savings traditionally kept in the home by housewives in non-egalitarian marriages who are unbanked. It can be seen as a form of resistance to patriarchy, as well as a hedge against a husband's profligacy or as a contingency fund, or as security in case of divorce.

The phenomenon exists in multiple countries, and can become a social or political issue, for example in the 2016 Indian banknote demonetisation. In some societies, this surreptitious custom is attached to a particular term, idiom, or other cultural expression: In Japan, it is referred to as hesokuri ("navel hoarding"), or in the past it was haribako-gin ("sewing box silver"); in Germany, it is referred to as schwarze Kasse ("black coffer"); and in Eastern European Jewish communities, it is called the knipl ("knot", as in a knotted kerchief).
