= Mincer earnings function =

Equation explaining wages via schooling and experience

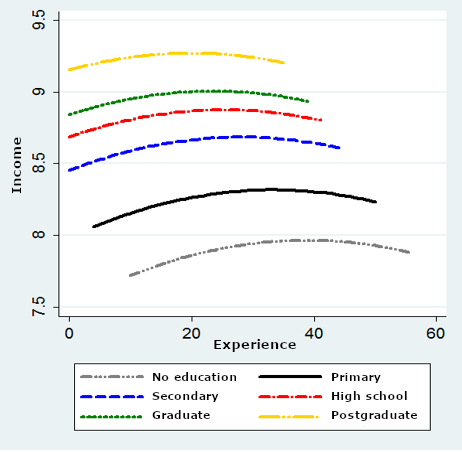
Income levels in Mexico, Mincerian earnings function

The Mincer earnings function is a single-equation model that explains wage income as a function of schooling and experience. It is named after Jacob Mincer. Thomas Lemieux argues it is "one of the most widely used models in empirical economics". The equation has been examined on many datasets. Typically the logarithm of earnings is modelled as the sum of years of education and a quadratic function of "years of potential experience".

$$\ln w = f (s, x) = \ln w_0 + \rho s + \beta_1 x + \beta_2 x^2 + \epsilon$$

Where the variables have the following meanings; $w$ is earnings (the intercept $w_0$ is the earnings of someone with no education and no experience); $s$ is years of schooling; $x$ is years of potential labour market experience; $\epsilon$ stands for the error term. The parameters $\rho$, and $\beta_{1}$, $\beta_{2}$ can be interpreted as the returns to schooling and experience, respectively.

Sherwin Rosen, in his article celebrating Mincer's contribution, memorably noted that when data was interrogated using this equation one might describe them as having been Mincered.
