= A Treatise on the Family =

Economics book

- Title page for A Treatise on the Family (1981)
- Author: Gary Becker
- Language: English
- Subject: Family economics
- Published: 1981
- Publisher: Harvard University Press
- ISBN: 0-674-90698-5

A Treatise on the Family is a 1981 book by Nobel-winning economist Gary Becker.

== Editions ==
- Gary S. Becker (1981, Enlarged ed., 1991). A Treatise on the Family. Cambridge, MA: Harvard University Press. ISBN 0-674-90698-5. Publisher's description and scrollable preview link.

== See also ==
- Family economics
