= Grossman model of health demand =

Health economics model

The Grossman model of health demand is a model for studying the demand for health and medical care outlined by Michael Grossman in a monograph in 1972 entitled: The demand for health: A theoretical and empirical investigation. The model based demand for medical care on the interaction between a demand function for health and a production function for health. Andrew Jones, Nigel Rice, and Paul Contoyannis call the model the "founding father of demand for health models".

== Model ==
In this model, health is a durable capital good which is inherited and depreciates over time. Investment in health takes the form of medical care purchases and other inputs and depreciation is interpreted as natural deterioration of health over time. In the model, health enters the utility function directly as a good people derive pleasure from and indirectly as an investment which makes more healthy time available for market and non-market activities.

The model creates a dynamic system of equations which can be cast as an optimization problem where utility is optimized over gross investment in health in each period, consumption of medical care, and time inputs in the gross investment function in each period. In this way, the length of life of the agent is partially endogenous to the model.

Dynamic optimization problems are often optimized using comparative statics, setting partial derivatives of the outcome function of interest, in this case the utility function, equal to zero. When the partial derivative of the utility function with respect to health consumption is assumed to equal zero, the resulting sub-model is the investment model. Solutions to the problem of this sub-model generally show that the rate of return on health capital must equal the opportunity cost of said capital. Thus, increases in the depreciation rate over time cause the optimal stock of health to decrease. If the marginal efficiency of capital curve is inelastic, gross investment grows over time. In practical terms, this model thus predicts that older people will have more sick time and time spent on increasing health and have higher medical expenditures than younger people. Another implication is that since increases in wages shift the marginal efficiency of capital curve to the right and increases the curve's slope, an increase in wage will increase the demand for health capital.

== Theoretical expansions ==
The Grossman model was extended in a number of directions. Among the first to include uncertainty in the model were Charles Phelps and Maureen Cropper.

The relationship between education and health was expanded in the model by Isaac Ehrlich. Regarding the relationship between education and medical care demand, one important question is whether the marginal efficiency of capital elasticity with respect to education is less than or greater than one. If the curve is elastic (elasticity greater than one), education will increase medical care demand. On the other hand, if the curve is inelastic, education will decrease medical care demand.

Jan Acton expanded the time constraint by including travel and waiting time in health care.

== Empirical estimation ==
Important empirical studies into these components include the RAND Health Insurance Study led by Joseph Newhouse in the 1970s, 1980s, and 1990s. This study sought to estimate income, money price, and time price elasticities of demand for medical care. Another important study was the Oregon Health Insurance in the late 2000s and also estimated the role of public health provision on healthcare demand and was led by Katherine Baicker and Amy Finkelstein.

== Criticisms ==
In the model, health is neither a pure investment good nor a pure consumption good, but health stock benefits the agent in two ways, directly increasing utility and second by increasing healthy time available for other activities. One early criticism is that framing health as a dichotomous concept is intuitively wrong in that health is simultaneously both and health provides both alternatives simultaneously.

Similarly, critics of Grossman's model have conceptualized the issue not from the point of view of healthcare demand, but the avoidance of illness which in itself is a disutility. In that sense, poor health is seen as a factor diminishing or interrupting an individual's ability to achieve maximum utility, with death being seen as a permanent interruption.

In another departure from Grossman's model on the question of expenditures and demand over time, University of Maryland Economics professor Maureen Cropper argues that healthcare demand should be delineated between preventative care and treatment of illness, the latter of which is often correlated with end of life treatment and can be seen as more random based on illness occurrence. The former variable is more predictable, but very much correlated to those earlier in their life cycle and present in the labor market.

Additionally, researchers have questioned the independence of the individual variables in the model such as education, income, as well as socioeconomic and occupation status. Particular attention had been paid to riskier professions, which generally entail higher wages due to occupational hazards and thus make such variable co-dependent. Much to the same point, Dr. Victor Fuchs argues that both genetic and gendered differences operate as unobserved, immutable variables within the model.

== Bibliography ==
- Grossman, Michael. "The demand for health: a theoretical and empirical investigation." NBER Books (1972).
- Grossman, Michael. "The demand for health after a decade." Journal of Health Economics 1, no. 1 (1982): 1-3.
- Grossman, Michael. "The demand for health, 30 years later: a very personal retrospective and prospective reflection." Journal of Health Economics 23, no. 4 (2004): 629-636.
- Grossman, Michael. Demand for Health: A Theoretical and Empirical Investigation. Columbia University Press, 2017.
