= Bequest motive =

Justification for leaving money to others

A bequest motive seeks to provide an economic justification for intergenerational transfers of wealth: in other words, to explain why people leave money behind when they die.

Which theory most realistically represents the intentions of estate planners is unclear. It is hard to test the theories empirically as data about wealth holdings is hard to find.

Possible explanations

- The most common explanation is altruism: the disposer (testator) gains some form of satisfaction from knowing that his/her heirs will enjoy their inherited wealth: for instance if a parent leaves the family home to their child.
- Another common explanation is accidental bequest. This theory was developed by economists Yaari (1965) and Davies (1980). Here it is not assumed that the disposer gains any specific benefit from leaving a bequest, but rather that the disposer knows
  - neither when he or she will die,
  - nor what his/her income and expenses will be while alive,

so cannot time his or her spending so that their savings run out at their exact date of death.

- Finally, "exchange bequest" occurs when the testator engages in a sort of strategic game in which potential beneficiaries must render a (non-marketable) service in exchange for the promise of inherited wealth. The most widely read model of exchange bequest was published by Bernheim, Summers and Shleifer (1985).

== See also ==
- Family economics
