= Kelvin Lancaster =

American economist

- Born: 10 December 1924; Sydney, Australia
- Died: 23 July 1999 (aged 74); New York, New York
- Education: University of London (PhD 1958); University of London External Programme (BSc 1953); University of Sydney (BA 1948) Sydney Boys High School
- Occupation: Professor
- Known for: Theory of the second best Lancastrian demand theory
- Scientific career
- Fields: Economics
- Workplaces: Columbia University

Kelvin John Lancaster (10 December 1924 – 23 July 1999) was an Australian mathematical economist and John Bates Clark professor of economics at Columbia University. He is best known for the development of the Theory of the Second Best with Richard Lipsey. Lancaster was also active in developing the calculus of qualitative economics, formulating the household production function, and applying the hedonic model to the estimation of housing prices.

In a 1966 paper, Lancaster developed what he called a "new theory of consumer demand", in which the then standard microeconomic demand theory was modified by stipulating that what consumers are seeking to acquire is not goods themselves (e.g. cars or train journeys) but the characteristics they contain (e.g. transport from A to B, display of fashion sense). As Palda (2013) explains

The second evolution in spatial economics was due to Kelvin Lancaster. His insight was that the basic qualities that consumers seek could be manipulated by combining different products. Hotelling had not considered this possibility. He had been content to accept that one good provided one underlying feature that could be measured in characteristics space. Lancaster saw the matter in greater breadth. Dinner was not just food on a table. It was an attempt to manipulate the basic constituents of flavor and nutrition into a satisfying gastronomic experience. Being a good cook meant knowing that taste had several dimensions including sweet, salty, sour, and savory. For a meal to be agreeable, it had to combine these elements of flavor and it also had to be easily digested, suggesting that nutritional dimensions such as greasiness, protein content, and temperature had to figure into the cook’s understanding. These basic culinary entities could each be thought of as lying on a left-right scale, or space. The ideal meal, then, sought to combine these features by varying each one as precisely as possible.

This theory provides a convenient account of the difference between less developed (so called "primitive") consumption economies, in which there are fewer goods than characteristics, and more developed ("sophisticated") consumption economies, in which there are more goods than characteristics, so that consumers can secure any combination of characteristics they desire, subject only to budget constraints. It also provides a way of predicting demand for new commodities, so long as they do not embody any new characteristics.

According to economist Jagdish Bhagwati, "He was widely regarded as a potential recipient of the Nobel Prize, for the notable impact that had been made by his contributions to the theory of second best and the integration of variety into economic theory. He joins the list of extraordinary economists such as Joan Robinson, Roy Harrod, and Mancur Olson whom death deprived of this singular honor."

Lancaster attended Sydney Boys High School, graduating in 1940.
