= Family economics =

Application of economic concepts to the study of the family

Family economics applies economic concepts such as production, division of labor, distribution, and decision making to the family. It is used to explain outcomes unique to family—such as marriage, the decision to have children, fertility, time devoted to domestic production, and dowry payments using economic analysis.

The family, although recognized as fundamental from Adam Smith onward, received little systematic treatment in economics before the 1960s. Important exceptions are Thomas Robert Malthus' model of population growth and Friedrich Engels' pioneering work on the structure of family, the latter being often mentioned in Marxist and feminist economics. Since the 1960s, family economics has developed within mainstream economics, propelled by the new home economics started by Gary Becker, Jacob Mincer, and their students. Standard themes include:

- Altruism in the family, including the rotten kid theorem.
- Child health and mortality.
- Family organization, background, and opportunities for children.
- Fertility and the demand for children in developed and developing countries.
- Human capital, social security, and the rise and fall of families.
- Intergenerational mobility and inequality, including the bequest motive.
- Interrelation and trade-off of 'quantity' and 'quality' of children through investment of time and other resources of parents.
- Macroeconomics of the family.
- Mate selection, search costs, marriage, divorce, and imperfect information.
- Sexual division of labor, intra-household bargaining, and the household production function.

Several surveys, treatises, and handbooks are available on the subject.

== History ==
Early economists were mostly interested in how much individuals contribute to social production, which translated into how much labor they supply in the labor market. Production within the household was not a subject that received systematic treatment by early economists.

In The Wealth of Nations, Adam Smith alludes to the importance of the family in his chapter on Wages. Smith wrote: "But though in disputes with their workmen, masters must generally have the advantage, there is, however, a certain rate below which it seems impossible to reduce, for any considerable time, the ordinary wages even of the lowest species of labour....A man must always live by his work, and his wages must at least be sufficient to maintain him. They must even upon most occasions be somewhat more; otherwise it would be impossible for him to bring up a family, and the race of such workmen could not last beyond the first generation." Accordingly, the wage received by the worker must be high enough to support the family in order to ensure the inter-generational reproduction of the working class. Malthus added to this analysis in his theory of population growth, where he argued that when wages are high laboring families tend to have more children, causing increase in population and reduction in wages.

The reproduction of the labor force, namely the way workers raise children to replace themselves, is a central issue in Marxist Theory. In Capital, Volume I, Marx argues that the amount of labor time that is necessary for the reproduction of workers is equal in value to the income they need to sustain a family which will raise a child to replace the worker. This amount is called necessary labor time. He calls surplus labor time the labor time that workers spend in addition to necessary time. This implies that for Marx the wage that workers need to sustain their families is one of the basic factors that regulates the economy. When he defines necessary labor time, however, Marx means the market labor necessary to earn the income that workers need so that their family can survive. Some connect working class demands for a family wage in late 19th century to Marx's ideas: male workers demanded that their wages be at a level sufficient to eliminate the need of wives and children to do market work. There is nothing on the production occurring within the family in Capital.

Friedrich Engels wrote on how the economic structure of the family is shaped by the structure of class society. According to Engels, the monogamous family, consisting of one man, one woman and children, is something created by the class system. So are adultery and prostitution, institutions that go together with the monogamous family system. Pre-capitalistic forms of marriage discussed by Engels were group marriage and pairing marriage. Engels argued, "with the ponderance of private property over communal property and the interest in its bequeathal, father rights and monogamy gained supremacy". He expected monogamy to disappear with the demise of capitalism. He wrote that within the family men are like capitalists and women are like the proletariat, and full freedom for women can only be possible if women will be brought "back into public industry", (p. 138) as he expected would happen under socialism. In his view under socialism women would not face the double burden of wage work and unpaid household work, since he expected household tasks to be provided as public services. Other Marxist economists of the late 19th and early 20th century like Bebel, Luxemburg, and Lenin also wrote on the necessity of bringing women back into the public industry.

The marginalist school, developed in the late 19th century, moved the focus of economics further away from family. The focus of early marginalists like Léon Walras, Stanley Jevons, and Alfred Marshall was market transactions, so any work done in the household was not of interest to marginalists. The basic economic unit was either the individual or the household, and when they took the household as the basic unit, they were not interested in how decisions were made within a household.

In the 1920s and 30s, economists like Eric Lindahl, Einar Dahlgren, Karin Kock, and Simon Kuznets argued that production within the household was an important part of national production, and without its inclusion GNP cannot be a complete indicator of national production level. During the same period Hazel Kyrk, Margaret Reid and Elizabeth Hoyt tried to develop a new field called consumption economics, trying to bring consumption and production roles in the household within the sphere of economics.

The New Home Economics developed in the 1960s and continues to be one of the main approaches in the field of family economics in the 21st century. The household production functions introduced by Gary Becker in his article "A Theory of Allocation of Time" are used in the analysis of many household decisions. Theodore W. Schultz captured aspects of family that are important for the whole economy and that were emphasized by Becker and Mincer, the founders of the NHE: the production of human capital in the form of investing in children, the maintenance of adults' human capital, the way members of family allocate their time between market and household work, and consumption decisions in the family." Contemporary family economics has also been enriched by contributions of Marxists and radical feminists written since the 1970s. While Marxism focuses on how class relationships and capitalism shapes family structure, the focus of radical feminism was on gender, patriarchy and men's domination of women in marriages and households. Marxist-feminists subsequently sought to integrate these two approaches by trying to show how patriarchy and capitalism interact with each other.

== Marriages as firms ==
The idea that marriages are like firms can be found in the work of New Home economists, Marxists, and feminists. Some Marxists and feminists view marriage of woman and man as analogous to the employment relationship in a capitalist society. For example, Shoshana Grossbard models both men and women as possibly hiring each other's work in household production, which she calls "spousal labor" or "Work-In-Household (WiHo)". To the extent that husbands employ their wives' WiHo and pay them a low "quasi-wage" women can be considered as being exploited by their husbands, as claimed by Marxist-feminist economists.

Legal ownership of the household is a question related to the analysis of marriages as firms. Robert Ellickson has argued that owners of the household's capital should have more influence on decision-making related to the household than those who work in the household's production. In contrast, Grossbard has proposed that those doing the household's production should have more control over decisions than owners of the household's capital. This is another example of parallels between Chicago-trained feminist economists and Marxist-feminist economists.

The question of how work in domestic production by one spouse is compensated by the other spouse who benefits from the work amounts to establishing terms of trade in a situation of specialization and division of labor. Gary Becker has analyzed division of labor in the household in terms of comparative advantage, generally assuming that women have a comparative advantage in household production and men in production outside the home. This has led to a tendency for feminist economists to dismiss Becker's analyses of marriage.

Other economic explanations for marriage that have parallels in standard economic analyses of firms include explanations emphasizing risk pooling and consequently reductions in the risks of illness or being unemployed as a result of marriage, and the role of marriages in facilitating specific investments such as children.

== Division of labor within the family ==
Family members divide their time between work inside the household and market work. The family as a unit may decide on which member of the family will do which task. Household work can be categorized in terms of whether the whole family benefits or only some members of the household. Some call 'housework' activities benefiting the whole family like laundry or cleaning and 'carework' activities that are done specifically for another member of the household, usually because that member is not able to do that work for himself or herself. Two basic forms of carework are child care and elder care. Household work benefiting the spouse more than the individual could include cooking or laundry as well as carework for spouses able to do the work themselves.

According to some neoclassical theories, the division of labor between household and market work is related to the utility function of the individuals within the family. In case a family has a greater preference for the goods that can be bought from the market, they can allocate more time to market work and buy goods from the market. If they have tastes for goods that are produced in the household, they may prefer to do more household work and consume goods produced within the household. Becker stated that women have a comparative advantage in domestic work, while men have a comparative advantage in market work. According to such viewpoint, when women specialize in household production and men specialize in market production, and they share what they produce, both men and women maximize their utilities.

However, complete specialization can bring some risks and disadvantages: the need for domestic work might decrease (especially when children grow up)and women who have completely specialized in household work might not be able to gain a decent wage when they return to market work; when both spouses have some experience in domestic work they can be more independent in case of divorce or death of a spouse. Barbara Bergman wrote that women's complete specialization in household labor, namely their being full-time housewives, often leads to women's financial insecurity and increases their likelihood of being subjected to domestic violence relative to situations of women working in the market and earning wages.

The game theoretic bargaining model offers an alternative framework to analyze the dynamics between household members in choosing consumption and production outcomes through a process of either explicit or implicit bargaining, conflict and/or cooperation. The bargaining model assumes that there is some gain to be made from entering into or remaining marriage, but how each partner's labor time is distributed and how the goods and services they produce are distributed are a direct result of bargaining. Bargaining processes with power considerations are formalized in Kaushik Basu's paper "Gender and Say: A Model of Household Behavior with Endogenously Determined Balance of Power". In this approach, power is distributed by the individual utility maximization function (if one partner has greater earning power, then that partner will have a better utility maximization position), and the outcomes through bargaining feedback into the process by endogenously affecting the balance of power. If the outcome favors one partner's position, than that partner's power will be even more strengthened relative the other partner.

Participation of women in the labor market, indicating that couples do not follow a traditional division of labor, grew dramatically in the 19th and 20th Century. This has been attributed by Jeremy Greenwood, Ananth Seshadri and Mehmet Yorukoglu to the introduction of time-saving appliances in the home. This growth in participation has been limited by institutional factors such as quotas on how many women can be employed in certain industries. For example, in England in the second half of the 19th century there was a campaign, supported by working class men, to restrict female market employment. Similarly, there have been bars on women's employment in the United States, including laws preventing women from being employed after marriage. In some countries like Japan, there are still some quotas on the market employment of women or on the employment of married women. Shoshana Grossbard has written on how marriage markets influence women's labor force participation.

== Decision-making in the family ==
Economists have different models of decision making regarding the allocation of labor within households. Some assume that there is a single decision maker in the household. If the head of the household is altruistic, he will get some satisfaction when he makes a decision that takes into account the benefit of other household members. Gary Becker argues that altruism of the decision maker of the household also benefits other members of the household, because as a result of altruism he will make his decisions by taking into consideration the benefits of other members. By doing this he will keep them within the household, and increase their willingness to contribute more to the family. According to Becker's rotten kid theorem, even if one of the household members were want to harm another household member, then the altruistic decision maker in the family prevents that member from harming the other member. In this a case, an altruistic decision maker might arrange distribution within the household in such a way that the utility the rotten kid gets from the increase of family income will be more than the utility he gets from the harm to the family member he envies. However Models of decision-making like Becker's altruism model do not take into consideration of conflicts that decisions made by a of the household's members would create for the other members.

Bargaining models are models that focus on how decision-making within the household may possibly proceed when such conflicts are taken into account. These models assume that household decisions are made by a bargaining process. They apply to bargaining between husband and wife, or between parent and child. Conflicts arises in case the outcome of a decision gives more utility to one party while the alternative decision is more advantage to the other party. According to Amartya Sen in some cases the bargaining agents might not have proper perceptions of either their economic contributions to the household or their interests. Based on this possibility he adds two more factors that, according to him, will affect the bargaining outcomes: "the perception of contribution" and "the perception of self-interest". If a person has a better sense of the value of his or her contribution to the family his or her power in the bargaining process will increase. According to Sen, when women do market work their bargaining power will improve, in part due to better perceptions of contribution and self-interest. As a result, decisions made will benefit women more. For example, Sen has applied this bargaining framework to explain the shortfall of women in the population in some parts of the world ("the missing women" problem): in view of their more limited participation in paid work women have weaker bargaining power in the household, more limited access to resources (food, care, health access) within the household relative to men, and are therefore less likely to survive than in other parts of the world where women participate more in market work.

Others still model household members as independent individual decision-makers who possibly made decisions before the household was formed.

== Fertility Decision ==
Malthus was the first to discuss fertility decision and its relationship with income. Malthus attributed two factors to fertility decisions: the first was the age at which people get married and the second is how often married couples engage in sexual activities. Gary Becker further discusses this topic.

Gary Becker talks about quantity and quality of children based on income. There is a perception that higher income tends to lead to the decision of having children, but studies have found that fertility is negatively correlated with income and that there is no economic relation between the two. In order to better compare the effects of income and fertility on economics, Becker makes two assumptions: preferences and quantity-versus-quality. Without quality, children could be considered an inferior good. However, by definition, there are no close substitutes to children. Becker used different comparisons to determine the level of elasticity of income on quantity and quality. He found that, relative to income, quantity had a low elasticity while quality had a high elasticity. The introduction of birth control greatly affected fertility decisions and mitigated problems involved with unplanned pregnancy. The innovation of the pill paved ways for women to pursue their career while still getting married. Contraceptives have also increased the breadth of decision making with families. The pill allowed a separation between the two decision: when to get married and how often to engage in sexual activities without the repercussion they faced back then. Before, women would restrain from sexual activities, even in marriages in order to avoid any unplanned pregnancy which could lead to a decline of women in the workforce. Having children hinders women’s advancement in the workforce. They must take time off the workforce to care for the infants and once returning, they suffer a decrease in pay. The decision of when to have a baby is important within the family and there are many other factors to consider.

Fertility might also be affected by business cycles. There is a negative correlation between fertility and business cycle.

== Effects of Marriages and Divorces ==
Becker discusses that marriages occur when the benefit of the two combined exceeds the benefit of them remaining single. The gains can be attributed to division of labor within the household production and deciding who has the comparative advantage between the two. Marriages provide a greater advantage in the sense that expenses that were once paid by single people could now be split among the two people. It creates lower costs for both people now than it did before. Economies of scale will increase now that the savings in cost has increased due to the level of production by two people compared to one. Marriages effect the economy because now they create a division of labor. Once married, they must decide which spouse would be more beneficial staying at home and which spouse would be better off working. The time spent in the market compared to household chores will be decided on who has the comparative advantage in each one. The two individuals are essentially deciding how much labor to supply to the market. Marriage costs can be expensive. It is important that both individuals consider income and their financial position before making a big decision. Marriage tends to happen at equilibrium when looking at the labor market. Anything in excess of the demand and supply of labor will give rise to the opportunity for divorce.

The risk for divorces has decreased since the education level have increased. People are now making decision based on other factors that once have proven to lead to divorce. Some of which includes education level and differences in income. Despite the benefits of marriages and the rate it is increasing, divorce rates have also increased. This is more apparent in lower income people. However, divorce is not all bad depending on which perspective you are looking at. Divorce helps the economy if looking at the point of view from third parties. They are costly to the couples that are involved in the divorce, but they open job opportunities for lawyers and other parties involved.

== See also ==
- Cost of raising a child
- Demographic economics
- Economic imperialism (economics)
- Feminist economics
- Hypergamy
- Intra-household bargaining
- Nancy Folbre
- New home economics
- Partner effects
