= Kenneth Wolpin =

American economist

Kenneth I. Wolpin is an American economist and emeritus professor of economics at University of Pennsylvania. At University of Pennsylvania, he was previously the Walter H. and Leonore Annenberg Professor of Social Sciences and Lawrence R. Klein Professor of Economics. He also held faculty positions at Rice University. From 2008 to 2011, he was also Editor of Wiley journal International Economic Review and also, from 1987 to 1997, co-editor of University of Wisconsin journal Journal of Human Resources.

He is the 2021 recipient of the Jacob Mincer Award from the Society of Labor Economist, which recognizes lifetime achievements in the field of labor economics. The award motivation specifies his contributions "as a pioneer and leading exponent of dynamic structural modelling, as a pioneer in the use of natural experiments and application of theory to interpret them, and as a leader in the creation and improvement of key datasets."
