= Parental dividend =

Social security policy proposal

The parental dividend is a policy proposal first suggested by economist Shirley P. Burggraf during a Bunting Fellowship at Radcliffe College. It proposes replacing the current generalized labor market funding apparatus of the US Social Security system with one that preferentially rewards parental labor and investment. While the current US Social Security system collects payroll taxes from working adults and redistributes them to retirees in amounts based on pre-retirement earnings, the parental dividend is a retirement benefit calculated according to the income of one's own adult children.

== Background ==
Shirley P. Burggraf's parental dividend is described in The Feminine Economy and Economic Man: Reviving the Role of the Family in the Post-Industrial Age (1997). The proposal has been described as an atypical feminist approach to solving crises of the American family unit by relying on market forces. According to sociologist David Popenoe on the topic of the parental dividend, “We should launch a society wide discussion of what would be the most far-reaching family policy of all: restructuring the national Social Security system.”

== Theory ==
Parental dividend theory is based on the idea that the future productivity of children can be helped or harmed by Social Security payments made in real-time by families to retirees. Financial knock-on effects of the parental dividend depend on a link between the long term successes of children and the amount of time parents spend rearing them. The greater the parental investment in terms of time and money, the greater a child's income is likely to be in adulthood. By changing the financial system supporting Social Security to preferentially assist parents in retirement, the work and costs of parenting become valuable and children raised in this environment would have a greater potential to earn more as adults, therefore resulting in greater retirement benefits for their parents.

According to economists Burggraf and Grossbard-Shechtman, Social Security with a parental dividend would remove the burden of paying for retirement twice, first in payroll taxes for one's own retirement through the US Social Security System, and simultaneously paying for the retirement of one's parents receiving low Social Security benefits thanks to their own opportunity costs of childcare. The concept links expenses associated with raising children, especially the opportunity costs of lost wages, to workers' time outside the work force resulting in reduced Social Security benefits. In this way, the parental dividend seeks to address a potential financial problem in the current US Social Security system, namely that the largest Social Security payments currently go to retirees who spent the least amount of time raising children.

== See also ==
- Balancing pension funding
- Child tax credit
- Cost of raising a child
- Tax on childlessness
