= Wolder v. Commissioner =

American legal case

- Court: United States Court of Appeals for the Second Circuit
- Full case name: Wolder v. Commissioner
- Argued: December 19, 1973
- Decided: February 21, 1974
- Citations: 493 F.2d 608 (2d Cir. 1974); 74-1 USTC (CCH) ¶ 12,982; 74-1 USTC (CCH) ¶ 9266

Case history
- Prior history: 58 T.C. 974

Court membership
- Judges sitting: Henry Friendly, Walter Roe Mansfield, James Lowell Oakes

Case opinions
- Majority: Oakes, joined by Friendly, Mansfield

Laws applied
- Internal Revenue Code

Wolder v. Commissioner, 493 F.2d 608 (2d Cir. 1974) the United States Court of Appeals for the Second Circuit decided whether 26 U.S.C. 102(a)'s exclusion of "bequests" from gross income included those made in consideration for services and whether the "detached and disinterested" standard applied to gifts made at death-time.

== Facts ==
Victor R. Wolder represented Marguerite K. Boyce as her attorney. In a written agreement with Boyce, Wolder agreed to render legal services "from time to time as long as both… shall live and not to bill her for such services." In exchange, Boyce promised to make a codicil to her will giving Wolder stock or securities from her estate. Wolder provided legal services without billing Boyce and she revised her will, bequeathing to him $15,845 and 750 shares of stock.

== Arguments ==
Wolder argued the bequests received from Boyce were excluded from income under § 102(a). He believed "bequest" in 102(a) had been interpreted by the courts to include bequests made for consideration between the beneficiary and decedent. In support of his argument Wolder cited United States v. Merriam, 263 U.S. 179 (1923) which allowed recipients under a will to exclude bequests received "in lieu of all compensation or commissions to which they would otherwise be entitled as executors or trustees" from their income.

== Reasoning ==
First, the court found Merriam inapplicable because there was a dispute as to whether the parties had, in fact, contracted for services, whereas it was undisputed that Wolder and Boyce had contracted and performed. Second, in Commissioner v. Duberstein the Supreme Court laid down guidelines to determine whether a transfer is a bona fide gift, examining the parties' intent and motives, their performance, and whether the transfer was the product of a "detached and disinterested generosity."

The court also noted that section § 102 is an exception to Congress' intent to form a comprehensive definition of income in § 61(a), which defines gross income as "all income from whatever sources derived." The court looked past the label Wolder and Boyce attached to their transfer finding that their intent was to provide compensation for services in the form of a bequest.

== Holding ==
The bequests received by Wolder were not excluded from income under § 102(a). Wolder and Boyce entered into and satisfied the obligations of a contract for services providing for a "postponed payment" in the form of a bequest.

== See also ==
- Income tax in the United States
- Gift tax
