= Economic unit =

In an economy, production, consumption and exchange are carried out by three basic economic units: the firm, the household, and the government.

1. Firms
  Firms make production decisions. These include what goods to produce, how these goods are to be produced and what prices to charge. They employ the various factors of production and they sell the finished goods to the households for consumption and to the government.
2. Households
  Households make consumption decisions and own factors of production. They provide firms with factor services in production, and buy finished goods from firms for consumption.
3. Government
  The government collects taxes from households, buys goods from firms, and distributes those goods to households individually or collectively. It also redistributes purchasing power between households.

== See also ==
- Agent (economics)
