= Old-age-security hypothesis =

Economic theory

The old-age-security hypothesis is an economic hypothesis according to which parents view their children as a source of income and personal services in old age. Within the framework of this hypothesis, the demand for children is considered as the need to ensure a safe old age. As a consequence, increasing the profitability of alternative assets or introducing a universal public pension system reduces the demand for children.

== Description ==
According to this hypothesis, the presence of a state pension system reduces the overall birth rate and hinders investment in the human capital of children, which in the long term leads to a decrease in the size of the working-age population and affects their overall income growth. On the contrary, the absence of alternative assets or state pension provision makes it necessary to have children.

This hypothesis is based on two basic assumptions: people control the number of children born and people in their actions are guided by selfish motives (that is, proceeding only from their own consumption throughout life). According to this hypothesis, payments from children to support their elderly parents are seen as a return on loans that parents spent to provide for their children in childhood.

Alternative hypotheses explaining the birth rate are intergenerational altruism and various hypotheses related to the labor market.

The earliest mention of the inverse relationship between the birth rate and the level of the population's pension is found in Leibenstein in 1957. Van Groezen, Leers and Meijdam in 2003, Sinn in 2007, Cigno and Werding in 2007, Ehrlich and Kim in 2007, Van Groezen and Meijdam in 2008, Gahvari in 2009, Cigno in 2010, expressed the opinion about the decline in the birth rate as a consequence of the introduction of the pension system. Fenge and von Weizsäcker in 2010, Regös in 2014, Boldrin, De Nardi and Jones in 2015. Guinnane in 2011, based on empirical evidence of declining fertility in historical time, considered the introduction of social protection as one of the reasons for the first demographic transition. Cigno and Rosati in 1992, Cigno in 2003, Billari and Galasso in 2009 examined this hypothesis at the level of specific countries and individual pension systems. Cigno and Werding in 2007 gave an overview of work on the relationship between pensions and fertility in the modern period. According to these studies, a smaller pension coverage leads to a higher birth rate.

== Alessandro Cigno ==
According to Alessandro Cigno, ensuring old age is an incentive for raising children and a dominant factor in increasing the birth rate. Cigno also believes that it has been proven that the coverage of the population by the pension system reduces the birth rate, although it increases household savings. In his opinion, the state pension system prevents parents from investing in the human capital of their children. Considering the rapidly aging population and the imbalance between the number of recipients of pensions and those who pay pension contributions as the reason for the deficit of the pension fund and the decrease in the income of pensioners, Alessandro Cigno proposes to pay the pension to parents directly from the pension contributions of their children.

== Robert Fenge and Beatrice Scheubel ==
In 2017, Robert Fenge and Beatrice Scheubel published an article Pensions and fertility: back to the roots, where they studied the relationship between the development of the state pension system, or rather the dynamics of the share of people participating in pension insurance programs and the dynamics of fertility, using the example of the German Empire at the end of 19 and beginning 20th century. In addition to pensions, the multivariate analysis took into account those factors that scientists usually cite as the cause of the first demographic transition. Together with pensions, the impact of factors such as literacy and urbanization was analyzed. According to Robert Fenge and Beatrice Scheubel, the introduction of pensions in Germany at the turn of the 19th and 20th centuries explains up to 15% of the decline in the birth rate in 1895–1907.

== UN Conference on the World Population in Bucharest, 1974 ==
A meeting dedicated to the reduction of the world population was held in Bucharest from August 19 to 30. Participants: more than 1.4 thousand delegates from 136 countries (at that time there were 138 countries in the UN, family planning is already being promoted in 59 countries). Initiator: The USA and the UN.

The plan was written in advance, it was mainly developed by the American side, initially contained quantitative target indicators for the CPR (Controlled Population Reduction) for individual countries, but as a result of the protests they had to be removed. It was the first official international document in the field of demography and fertility reduction.

The Conference is proud for the first time in history, setting the goal of "curbing population growth" for the peoples. And also worked out specific ways to achieve this Goal. Among them is the introduction of benefits and pensions.

"Recognizing the diversity of social, cultural, political and economic conditions, everyone agrees that the following development goals will lead to a moderate birth rate: reduction of infant and child mortality, full involvement of women in the development process (education, economics, politics), promotion of social justice, accessibility of education, eradication of child labor and abuse with children, the introduction of social security and old-age pensions, the establishment of a minimum age for marriage."

By this time, demographic policy and "family planning" programs had been successfully applied in Asian countries, in particular in India, Japan, Pakistan and Sri Lanka. In 1974, teaching staff worked in 39 countries, in which about 80% of the population of the "developing world" lived.

=== Barbara Entwistle ===
Here is how the author explains the purpose of his work: In 1974, a meeting took place in Bucharest, which resulted in the adoption of an Action Plan for the World Population. It is strongly recommended to introduce everywhere school education and pensions in order to benefit the population, as well as to reduce its number.

Because in America it was already generally accepted that pensions and education lower fertility. And to check the correctness of this opinion, its effectiveness (degree of impact) and applicability to different countries, as well as the predictions made earlier, Barbara just carried out this huge work.

About previous studies. On page 258, the author mentions previous studies of the dependence of fertility on pensions and education, these are: McGreevy and Birdsall (1974), and the Triangle Research Institute (1971), as well as Kirk (1971), Kasarda (1971), Adelman (1963), Friedlander and Silver (1967) and Beaver (1975). and others, at least 15. They showed very different results, from zero correlation to significant (higher than the statistical error). Light was shed by the study of Friedlander and Silver (1967), where they first explored the whole world, but then developed and developing countries separately, and it turned out that the negative impact of education on fertility is indeed significant in developing countries, but practically zero in developed countries.

These studies used different criteria for education (for example: literacy, school enrollment, circulation of newspapers, etc.), included a different number of variables (i.e., a unified method for calculating dependence has not yet been developed), and Barbara comes to the conclusion that correlation becomes significant when the study includes 4–5 variables, in other words, when education is complemented by something else. (p. 261)

Beaver (1975) finds that the effect of education on fertility is more pronounced in TFR but not OCD because TFR is an age-standardized unit of measure. But the difference in results is still small. The same is indicated by the studies of Adelman (1963) and Janowitz (1971). Another interesting finding from Beaver is that education has an effect on OCD with a lag of 12.5 years, but not 7.5 years. (This conclusion of Beaver is not supported by Barbara's own research, she found no dependence on lags of 5, 10 and 15 years.) (P. 262)

Opportunities for education have skyrocketed around the world since World War II, says Barbara. Other studies of the dependence of fertility on education, using, like Beaver, data for the 1950s - early 1960s (for example, Ekanem, 1972), found no relationship between them. (p. 263)

So the question of the dependence of fertility on education remains unclear, although it has been comprehensively and in detail discussed. On this, with education, Barbara ends and moves on to pensions.

Friedlander and Silver (1967) were the first to introduce pensions into country comparisons. They found a significant influence of this factor (pensions), both for developed and developing (especially developing) countries, which was not found according to earlier data from 1960. (pp. 263–264). Holm (1975), in contrast to Friedlander and Silver, already finds a significant negative correlation between fertility and pension coverage, possibly due to the fact that more recent data from the mid-1960s are used. The size of the pension has very little effect on the birth rate. (p. 264).

Kelly, Cutwright, and Hittle (1976) criticized Holm (1975) for not taking into account the so-called. modernization, they argued that the drop in the birth rate does not actually correlate with pensions, but with modernization, and with the introduction of the modernization coefficient they created, the impact of pensions was already insignificant. (p. 265)

Holm responded with a paper (1976), where he analyzed the correlation of fertility and another indicator, the percentage of government spending on pensions from the GDP of that state, and on a larger sample of countries. She confirmed the pension hypothesis (that pensions reduce the birth rate), even with the inclusion of this modernization index. (These results are consistent with those of Barbara's dissertation in Chapters 5 and 6.) Again, Holm's work shows a stronger negative effect of pensions on fertility in developing countries, especially in the early 1960s (p. 265).

Barbara mentions 4 more studies, which gave the same result as hers, but her work is more detailed, because it shows that pensions affect not only the birth rate, but also the rate at which it declines, that pensions have a delayed effect, and that this effect increased during the 1960s. Initially, the effect (of lower fertility due to pensions) was more pronounced in developing countries, but the difference faded as they developed over a 10-year period. (p. 266)

According to Barbara, the creation of comparative analysis models across countries (in terms of the dependence of fertility on economic indicators) began, according to Barbara, in Weintraub's (1962) rather simple model of the dependence of OCD on economic development indices. (p. 267) Since then, the models have become more complex, including more and more variables, including education and pensions, as well as population density, urbanization index, working women, family planning programs, and others (Leibenstein, 1975, Adelman, 1963, Ekanem, 1972). It is curious that many studies (Ekanem, 1972, Gregory and Campbell, 1976, Moldin et al., 1978) show a positive, albeit small, impact of urbanization, like this thesis, and a clear negative impact of urbanization on fertility - Beaver (1975). Moldin et al. (1978) showed a significant impact of family planning programs in developed countries 1965-1975, but did not take into account pensions.

A study by Moldin (1978) showed that family planning programs (introduced mainly in the 1960s) in developing countries have mitigated the effect of economic inequality on fertility, i.e. the poor, whose fertility is usually higher, have lowered this rate. (p. 267) In the 1970s, the delayed effects of family planning programs were expected to affect developed countries (which started earlier) than developing countries, but Moldin did not find significant differences between these groups of countries in the rate of decline in fertility in the 1970s. ... This may indicate that some other factor influenced. p. 268

Research became more complex, Heer (1966), Kirk (1971), Gregory et al. (1971), Beaver (1975), Gregory and Campbell (1976), examined a variety of relationships on a variety of variables. (p. 269) Attention is paid to threshold values, for example, Moldin (1978) estimates the threshold of female literacy from 55 to 85%, from that moment it begins to influence fertility.

The same threshold should apply to pensions, Barbara notes, but there is no research yet that defines this threshold.

Pages 271-276 are devoted to some controversial issues of methodology, for example, the author is a supporter of the so-called. homogeneity, i.e. claims that different nations under the same conditions will behave in the same way. "Heterogeneous women" let them prove it, she says. Or the question of how best to group nations for analysis? or the issue of the influence of time on the results (at different points in time, the reaction to variables (the same pensions and education) may be different, or the issue of converting one unit of fertility measurement to another, the issue of data accuracy, etc.)

Barbara notes that there is interdependence, but she would view education and pensions as causes, and fertility as a consequence. In the chapter "Pension and education programs as a policy of fertility," Barbara notes that these programs are essentially equal to the political decision of the state to reduce the birth rate and curb the growth of its population, and the choice is up to the state. (p. 287). Thus, Tsul and Baugh (1978, p. 33) conclude that the trends of recent years are encouraging because rid the world of the darkest prospects of overpopulation, famine and world war, outlined, according to the Malthusians, by the year 2000. Has a remedy been found for overpopulation? It's premature to think so, says Barbara. In 1975, the birth rate was 4,688 births per 1,000 women in 24 Latin American countries, 6,264 in 40 African countries, 6,009 in 16 countries in the Middle East, 4,572 in 25 Asian countries - the danger has not yet passed. By 1978 (according to Tsula and Baugh's report), the situation had not changed, and 2/3 of developing countries have this figure above 5,000, and more than half of them are more than 6,000, that is, the countries of the Third World double their numbers per generation. Tsul and Baugh are pinning their hopes on family planning programs that world leaders must implement. (p. 288) But these programs only reduce the number of children to what is desired, which is still quite high in developing countries, says Arnold et al. (1975), examining 4 countries.

The policy of reducing the birth rate must continue, Barbara insists.

Barbara Entwistle, in her 1981 dissertation, proposes a "child role hypothesis" based on the thesis that mass education and pension programs are linked to fertility by feedback. (pp. 39, 277) Barbara notes that this thesis was put forward by scientists and before her, mentions four previous studies of the relationship between pensions and fertility, two of which (Friedlander and Silver, 1967, and Kelly and others, 1976) did not find a connection. one revealed a very weak dependence, on the verge of statistical error (Hom, 1975), and the last (Hom, 1976) showed a strong dependence.

Barbara conducted a comprehensive analysis for 146 ethnic populations (countries), of which 120 had complete data, and for 1960, 1965 and 1970. (p. 145) It turned out that 1970 showed a more pronounced dependence than 1965, and 1965, in turn, showed a more pronounced dependence than 1960, in other words, earlier work examined earlier data, where the dependence is small.

Barbara names two explanations for this negative dependence (fertility on pensions), accepted in American demography: economic, where children are breadwinners in old age, and pensions reduce this role, and generally accepted that pensions change the structure of the family. Both of them lead to the same result - a decrease in the birth rate, so Barbara does not distinguish between them, i.e. does not introduce indices measuring the value of children, nor the strength of bonds between children and parents (p. 203). Although she herself is leaning towards the generally accepted explanation, rather than the explanation of "cost and benefit", because, in her opinion, this explains the delayed effect of pensions. Parents-to-be must learn about pensions and the opportunities they provide, and this takes some time. This generally accepted explanation (the destruction of the family structure) is also supported by the fact that the effect of pensions increases over time (p. 204), which, in her opinion, would not have been the case with the "prices and benefits" mechanism.

Pensions have been found to have a deferred effect, i.e. their action slows down.

But Barbara did not find the dependence of fertility on educational programs, or very weak, on the verge of a statistical error, which "disappointed" her (p. 204), which again, in her opinion, does not confirm the hypothesis of "prices and benefits," according to which The "price" of children is greatly increased precisely from education, because parents are forced to spend many years on school bags and notebooks, instead of sending the child to work and carrying a penny into the house. (pp. 204, 278, 281-282) Another confirmation of the hypothesis of the influence of pensions precisely through the weakening of family ties, Barbara considers the fact that pensions initially had a stronger effect on developing countries, because in developed family ties were already weakened.

Barbara notes two studies (Müller, 1972, and Arnold et al., 1975) that introduced indices of family ties, and showed that fertility changes in accordance with them, as predicted. She emphasizes the importance of developing such indices, and so that they include not only the content of parents, but also cohabitation (which is not in the Hypothesis of the role of children), there are no such indicators yet, and most of the countries cannot be evaluated by this indicator. (Although Barbara's own preliminary research did not show fertility as a function of cohabitation indices and the number of adults in the household, therefore she did not include these indices in the main study.)

Caldwell (1976,1977) put forward a similar hypothesis that Westernization (the Western way of life, namely education and pensions) rather than industrialization reduces fertility, based on African countries where industrialization was in its infancy, but something already influenced fertility - and this, according to the author, is Westernization. In other words, the prospect of receiving a pension in the future already influenced (i.e., the future parent considered himself as having already worked at the factory and a recipient of the pension, although the factory was not yet open), and not an example of ancestors (who did not work in factories ). Although such a claim needs more proof, adds Barbara.

But pensions just fit into the Hypothesis of the role of children, because liberate children from the need to feed their parents, thereby weakening family ties, reducing family and the desire to have their own children, and the fertility predictions made on this basis came true.

On pages 205 (also 283, 289), Barbara sums up that pensions are extremely promising for reducing the birth rate, and advises all Third World countries to introduce pensions (including funded ones) for this purpose. Training programs for such a reduction are not useful, says Barbara, except in terms of spreading knowledge about contraception, activities outside the family, etc. among future parents. And even such education, firstly, will take time, and secondly, it will have little effect.

Cites article 20 of the Universal Declaration of Human Rights (1948), which says that "everyone has the right to social security (cited by Savi, 1972, p. 2), and notes that the Plan of Action on World Population (1974) supports this thesis precisely from the goal of reducing the population, as well as ensuring human rights.

Barbara finds it useful not only to make a comparative analysis across countries, but also for individual communities that differ in terms of pension coverage and education, up to the study of individual families (for example, such studies could clarify the role of "son preference" by examining the role of education of boys and girls in -separability), the hypothesis of the role of children is very promising, because predictions come true. (p. 285) Conclusions: the nuclear family is weaker than the "long" family (which includes many relatives, is less able to pay the "price" of children, because it does not receive adequate support from relatives, although it fits better into the modern industrial society, and the nuclear family accompanies lower fertility.

Also, Barbara calls into question the thesis adopted before her that all nations react to the same innovations in the same way. The results of her work do not confirm either the assumption of homogeneity (that all nations react in the same way) or heterogeneity. For example, in developed countries, the decline in fertility due to the introduction of pensions turned out to be less than the forecast showed. The greatest influence of pensions had on the developing countries and the countries of Latin America, and of the studied 1960, 1965 and 1970, the effect was most pronounced in 1970.

=== Borisov Vladimir Al. ===
In his book Prospects of fertility [6], back in 1976, Borisov, among the reasons for having few children, along with the separation of children from family production (in a peasant family), the termination of communal land ownership, also calls social insurance systems, i.e. pensions, as well as developed medicine, which reduce the dependence of the elderly on their children and makes children "unnecessary" for these purposes. Borisov saw the reason for the decline in the birth rate in the reduction of the need for children, and argued that no improvements in living conditions and child allowances will increase the birth rate if there is no socio-cultural need for children-the so-called behavioral approach. For his views on the demographic situation, the threat of depopulation in the country and the demographic policy adopted at that time, Borisov was dismissed from the university and deprived of the right to teach until 1991, A. I. Antonov reports in his article "80 years since the birth of Vladimir Alexandrovich Borisov" [7]. The reason was his speech at a student conference at Moscow State University. The Leninsky District Committee of the CPSU of Moscow declared him an " apolitical scientist" At that time, it was customary to make ironic remarks about the "threat of depopulation", and some reviewers generally believed that such a thing was impossible in the next 500 years. In 1982, Borisov was demoted to just a researcher. The reason is again "careless performance" (the words of Borisov himself, from his autobiography). This harassment continued in the post-Soviet period, when in 1994 a meeting on the defense of his doctoral dissertation was disrupted. Borisov considered the birth rate indicator to be the main one in demography, and the decline in the birth rate was the global problem No. 1. He saw the reason for the lack of children in the lack of motivation, intergenerational ties (the need for children). He also believed that this process (the so-called Demographic Transition) is reversible, provided that such a need is returned. Benefits and living conditions alone will not increase the birth rate-if there is no need for children, Borisov believed. (Also, in his article, Antonov noted that the phenomenon of low birth rate has not been sufficiently studied). Borisov was once a student of Urlanis, and if Borisov wrote his landmark work Birth Rate Prospects in 1976, then Urlanis wrote "Problems of Population Dynamics of the USSR" in 1974, from which the forecasts of demographic processes for 2000 were removed by censorship. The future will show that they were correct. Borisov is also the author of a GMER model of a hypothetical minimum of natural fertility. Antonov defines the essence of this model as "behavioral".

== Bibliography ==
- The long-term determinants of marital fertility in the developed world (19th and 20th centuries): The role of welfare policies Jesús J. Sánchez-Barricarte
- EDUCATION, PENSION PROGRAMS, AND FERTILITY: A CROSS-NATIONAL INVESTIGATION, WITH SPECIAL REFERENCE TO THE POTENTIAL HELD BY EDUCATION AND PENSION PROGRAMS AS FERTILITY REDUCTION POLICIES
- Entwisle, Barbara (M.A.: Sociology, 1978) Title: The effect of pension programs on fertility : a replicative study Advisor: Kobrin, Frances E.
- Barbara Entwisle, Albert I. Hermalin, William M. Mason Socioeconomic Determinants of Fertility Behavior in Developing Nations: Theory and Initial Results
- The Effect of Old-Age Pensions on Fertility: Evidence from a Natural Experiment in Brazil
- The impact of pension systems on fertility rate: a lesson for developing countries
- Influence of women's workforce participation and pensions on total fertility rate: a theoretical and econometric study
- Pension, Fertility, and Education
- Fertility and Pension Programs in LDCs: A Model of Mutual Reinforcement
- Fertility and education investment incentive with a pay-as-you-go pension
- The effects of child-related benefits and pensions on fertility by birth order: a test on Hungarian data
- Pensions with endogenous and stochastic fertility
- The fertility effects of public pension: Evidence from the new rural pension scheme in China
