= Cost of raising a child =

The cost of raising a child varies widely from country to country. It is usually determined according to a formula that accounts for major areas of expenditure, such as food, housing, and clothing and opportunity costs of child care time. However, any given family's actual expenses may differ from the estimates. For example, the rent on a home does not usually change when the tenants have another child, so the family's housing costs may remain the same. In other cases, the home may be too small, in which case the family might move to a larger home at a higher cost. The amount spent raising a child tends to increase with a family's income.

== Developing countries ==
According to Globalissues.org, "Almost half the world—over three billion people—live on less than US$2.50 a day." This statistic includes children. The calculation of the cost to raise a child in developing countries is difficult, since families often do not operate with currency, but barter or trade to provide for their children. It is argued that in developing areas the balance between earnings and costs of having children is changing, because the mean number of children per couple in many developing areas has decreased dramatically, especially in Asia, North Africa and the Near East. According to a 2020 report, 356 million children – 17.5 per cent – live in extreme poverty (less than US$1.90 a day).

=== Argentina ===
Argentina's INDEC provides a breakdown of minimum costs per person in household, known as the "canasta básica total", this metric doesn't measure the average cost, but the minimum cost (poverty line) and is published monthly. All values are per "equivalent adult".

Monthly values of the "canasta básica total" for Greater Buenos Aires
Age	Cost per month (converted to US dollars via official exchange rate)	Equivalent adult
less than 1	$ 86.96	0.35
1	$ 91.93	0.37
2	$ 114.29	0.46
3	$ 126.71	0.51
4	$ 136.65	0.55
5	$ 149.07	0.60
6	$ 159.01	0.64
7	$ 163.98	0.66
8	$ 168.95	0.68
9	$ 171.43	0.69
10	$ 196.28	0.79
11	$ 203.73	0.82
12	$ 211.18	0.85
13	$ 223.61	0.90
14	$ 238.51	0.96
15	$ 248.45	1.00
16	$ 255.90	1.03
17	$ 258.39	1.04
18 to 29	$ 253.42	1.02

Data for June 2022. Exchange rate 1 US dollar is 135,7500 ARG (July 2022). This aggregates to around $ 41,501.40 from birth to 18 years old.

=== India ===
Based on an estimate by Economic Times in April 2011 and adjusted to inflation for August 2022, the cost of raising a child from birth to age of majority (21 Years) for a middle to upper-middle income family comes to about ₹1.17 crore (equivalent to ₹1.4 crore or US$140,000 in 2026) in total.

Cost break up is as follows:

Cost of raising a child in India (as of August, 2022)
Expenditure class	Estimated cost (Rs. lakh)	% of cost
Education	49.35	46%
Housing	20.37	19%
Entertainment	12.87	12%
Clothing	6.44	6%
Food	5.36	5%
Transportation	5.36	5%
Healthcare	4.29	4%
Others	3.21	3%
Total	117.25	100%

Note: Estimate assumes cost of birth, but doesn't consider any major illness in child.

== Developed countries ==
=== Canada ===
According to the Fraser Institute, it can cost less than $4,500 per year to raise a child.

=== United Kingdom ===
Child Poverty Action Group's annual cost of a child report looks at how much it costs families to provide a minimum socially acceptable standard of living for their children. The 2022 report shows the cost of raising a child from birth to 18 years old as £157,562 for a couple family or £208,735 for a single parent/guardian.

The Times estimates that it costs £202,660 to raise a child from birth to 18 in the UK. This includes the cost of housing and childcare. This works out to an average approximate of £11,250 per year, or £938 per month.

=== United States ===
Based on a survey by the U.S. Department of Agriculture, the table below shows the estimated Average Spending on Children by Families. The data comes from the Consumer Expenditure Survey by the U.S. Department of Labor, conducted from 2005-06. The figures have been updated to 2011 dollars using the Consumer Price Index. However, some dispute the numbers as being biased high for political reasons (e.g., Texas A&M University Finance Professor H. Swint Friday: "The numbers, reported by the U.S. Department of Agriculture, are outrageously misleading. Often government statistics are produced for political objectives that cause the research methodology to be biased toward finding the highest dollar amount to support the objective.").

These figures from the USDA go up to age 18, and do not include any college or university education. Nor does it offer any spending estimates if the child remains in the home as a dependent after the age of 18.

Both tables are for the United States overall, not based on any specific region in the country.

Dual-Parent Family - USDA Average Spending per Child (not the basic cost of raising)
Age of Child	Housing	Food	Transport.	Clothing	Health	Child Care /Education	Misc.	Total
Before-tax income: Less than $59,410 (Average = $38,000)
0 to 2	2,990	1,160	1,170	640	630	2,040	420	9,050
3 to 5	2,990	1,260	1,230	500	590	1,910	620	9,100
6 to 8	2,990	1,710	1,350	570	660	1,290	630	8,760
9 to 11	2,990	1,970	1,350	580	710	1,910	630	9,520
12 to 14	2,990	2,130	1,480	690	1,090	1,110	700	9,960
15 to 17	2,990	2,120	1,630	730	1,010	1,290	589	9,970
Total	53,820	31,050	24,630	11,130	14,070	23,640	10,740	169,080
Before-tax income: $59,410 to $102,870 (Average = $79,940)
0 to 2	3,920	1,405	1,690	760	850	2,860	890	12,370
3 to 5	3,920	1,490	1,740	610	800	2,740	1,090	12,390
6 to 8	3,920	2,100	1,860	680	940	1,680	1,110	12,290
9 to 11	3,920	2,400	1,870	710	1,000	2,110	1,100	13,110
12 to 14	3,920	2,580	1,990	840	1,410	1,910	1,170	13,820
15 to 17	3,920	2,570	2,150	900	1,330	2,400	1,050	14,320
Total	70,560	37,620	33,900	13,500	18,990	41,100	19,230	234,900
Before-tax income: More than $102,870 (Average = $180,040)
0 to 2	7,100	1,900	2,550	1,050	980	5,090	1,790	20,460
3 to 5	7,100	2,000	2,610	880	930	4,970	1,990	20,480
6 to 8	7,100	2,630	2,730	970	1,080	3,910	2,000	20,420
9 to 11	7,100	2,980	2,730	1,010	1,150	4,350	2,000	21,320
12 to 14	7,100	3,190	2,860	1,170	1,610	4,700	2,070	22,700
15 to 17	7,100	3,180	3,020	1,280	1,520	6,460	1,950	24,510
Total	127,800	47,640	49,500	19,080	21,810	88,440	35,400	389,670

All numbers are in US dollars.

Single-Parent Family - USDA Average Spending per Child (not the basic cost of raising)
Age of Child	Housing	Food	Transport.	Clothing	Health	Child care /Education	Misc.	Total
Before-tax income: Less than 40,410 (Average = $18,350)
0 to 2	2,840	1,400	680	410	520	1,400	510	7,760
3 to 5	2,840	1,370	920	330	600	1,940	610	8,610
6 to 8	2,840	1,830	1,030	340	670	1,940	780	8,450
9 to 11	2,840	2,010	1,060	400	620	1,360	740	9,030
12 to 14	2,840	2,150	1,130	420	940	1,120	840	9,440
15 to 17	2,840	2,270	1,130	460	930	880	670	9,180
Total	51,120	33,090	17,850	7,080	12,840	22,980	12,450	157,410
Before-tax income: $59,410 or more (Average = $107,820)
0 to 2	5,880	2,080	1,920	590	980	3,670	1,650	16,770
3 to 5	5,880	2,070	2,160	500	1,090	4,210	1,750	17,660
6 to 8	5,880	2,680	2,260	530	1,180	3,350	1,930	17,810
9 to 11	5,880	3,000	2,300	610	1,110	3,880	1,880	18,660
12 to 14	5,880	3,080	2,370	650	1,560	4,150	1,980	19,670
15 to 17	5,880	3,220	2,370	730	1,550	5,010	1,810	20,570
Total	105,840	48,390	40,140	10,830	22,410	72,810	33,000	333,420

All numbers are in US dollars.

== See also ==
- Jonathan V. Last
- Natalist policy
- Only child
- Child care
- Child support
- Childfree
- Cost of living
- Child penalties
- Demographic economics
- Family economics
- Family planning
- Family values
- Single parent
- Middle-class squeeze
- Old-age-security hypothesis
- Parent–offspring conflict
- Parental investment
- Parental leave
