= Jacob Mincer =

American economist (1922–2006)

- Born: July 15, 1922; Tomaszów Lubelski, Poland
- Died: August 20, 2006 (aged 84); New York City, U.S.

Academic background
- Education: Emory University (BA); Columbia University (PhD)
- Doctoral advisor: George Stigler; Harold Barger
- Influences: H. Gregg Lewis

Academic work
- Discipline: Labour economics
- School or tradition: Chicago School of Economics
- Institutions: NBER (1960–2006); Columbia University (1959–91)
- Doctoral students: Reuben Gronau; George Borjas
- Notable ideas: Idea of human capital Labour economics
- Awards: IZA Prize in Labor Economics (2002)

Jacob Mincer (July 15, 1922 – August 20, 2006) was a Polish-American economist, widely regarded as the father of modern labor economics. He was the Joseph L. Buttenwieser Professor of Economics and Social Relations at Columbia University for most of his active life.

== Biography ==
Born in Tomaszów Lubelski, Poland, in a Jewish family, Mincer survived World War II in concentration camps in Poland and Germany as a teenager. After graduating from Emory University in 1950, Mincer received his PhD from Columbia University in 1957.

Following teaching stints at City College of New York, Hebrew University, Stockholm School of Economics and the University of Chicago, Mincer joined Columbia's faculty in 1959. He stayed at Columbia until his retirement in 1991.

Mincer was also a member of the National Bureau of Economic Research from 1960 through his death.

Mincer died at his Manhattan home on August 20, 2006, due to complications from Parkinson's disease, according to his wife, Dr. Flora Mincer, and his daughters, Deborah Mincer (Sussman) and Carolyn Mincer.

== Contributions to economic science ==
Mincer was considered by many to be a father of modern labor economics. As a leading member of a group of economists known as the Chicago School of Economics, Mincer and Nobel Laureate Gary Becker helped to develop the empirical foundations of human capital theory, consequently revolutionizing the field of labor economics.

During his academic career, Mincer authored four books and hundreds of journal articles, papers and essays. Mincer's ground-breaking work: Schooling, Experience and Earnings, published in 1974, used data from the 1950 and 1960 Censuses to relate income distribution in America to the varying amounts of education and on-the-job training among workers. "He calculated, for example, that annual earnings rose by 5 to 10 percent in the 1950s and 1960s for every year of additional schooling. There was a similar, although smaller, return on investment in job training—and age played a role."

Mincer's work continues to have a profound impact on the field of labor economics. Papers in the field frequently use Mincerian equations, which model wages as a function of human capital in statistical estimation. And as a result of Mincer's pioneering work, variables such as schooling and work experience are now the most commonly used measures of human capital.

== Awards and prizes ==
In 1967 Mincer was elected as a Fellow of the American Statistical Association.

In 1991, he received an honorary doctorate from the University of Chicago which recognized his seminal work in the economic analysis of earnings and inequality, the labor force decisions of women and of job mobility. The citation for the degree also recognized Mincer's work in this area that has helped guide a generation of economists who study these important social questions.

In recognition of his lifetime achievements in economics, Mincer was awarded the first IZA Prize in Labor Economics of the Institute for the Study of Labor (Bonn, Germany). The $50,000 prize was presented to Mincer by more than 100 of his former students and colleagues at a conference at Columbia University in 2002.

In 2004 Mincer received a Career Achievement Award from the Society of Labor Economists; the annual award has subsequently become known as the Mincer Award.

Mincer was never awarded a Nobel Prize, though he was considered one of the world's greatest economists of the 20th century, and was nominated for the award numerous times by admiring colleagues.

== Quotes regarding Mincer ==
..the decade Jacob and I spent working together was surely one of the most, if not the most exciting and fruitful in my life.

— Gary Becker, 2006

The close blending of theory and data represented in Mincer's work has shaped the direction of labor economics and influenced and inspired all those who have followed him.

— David Card, 2006

His very simple formulation basically fits the data for understanding how earnings are related to educational attainment in virtually every country in every time period.

— Lawrence F. Katz, 2006

== Selected bibliography ==
Book chapters

- Mincer, Jacob (1962), "Labor force participation of married women: a study of labor supply", in Lewis, H. Greg (ed.), Aspects of labor economics, Princeton: Princeton University Press, pp. 63–105.

Reprinted as: Mincer, Jacob (1995), "Labor force participation of married women: a study of labor supply", in Humphries, Jane (ed.), Gender and economics, Aldershot, England Brookfield, Vermont, USA: Edward Elgar, pp. 211–253, ISBN 9781852788438.

- Mincer, Jacob; Polachek, Solomon (1995), "Family investments in human capital: earnings of women (1974)", in Humphries, Jane (ed.), Gender and economics, Aldershot, England Brookfield, Vermont, USA: Edward Elgar, pp. 317–349, ISBN 9781852788438.

Journal articles

- Mincer, Jacob; Polachek, Solomon (March–April 1974). "Family investments in human capital: earnings of women" (PDF). Journal of Political Economy. 82 (2): s76–s108. doi:10.1086/260293. JSTOR 1829993. S2CID 154095476.
