= Gary Becker =

American economist (1930–2014)

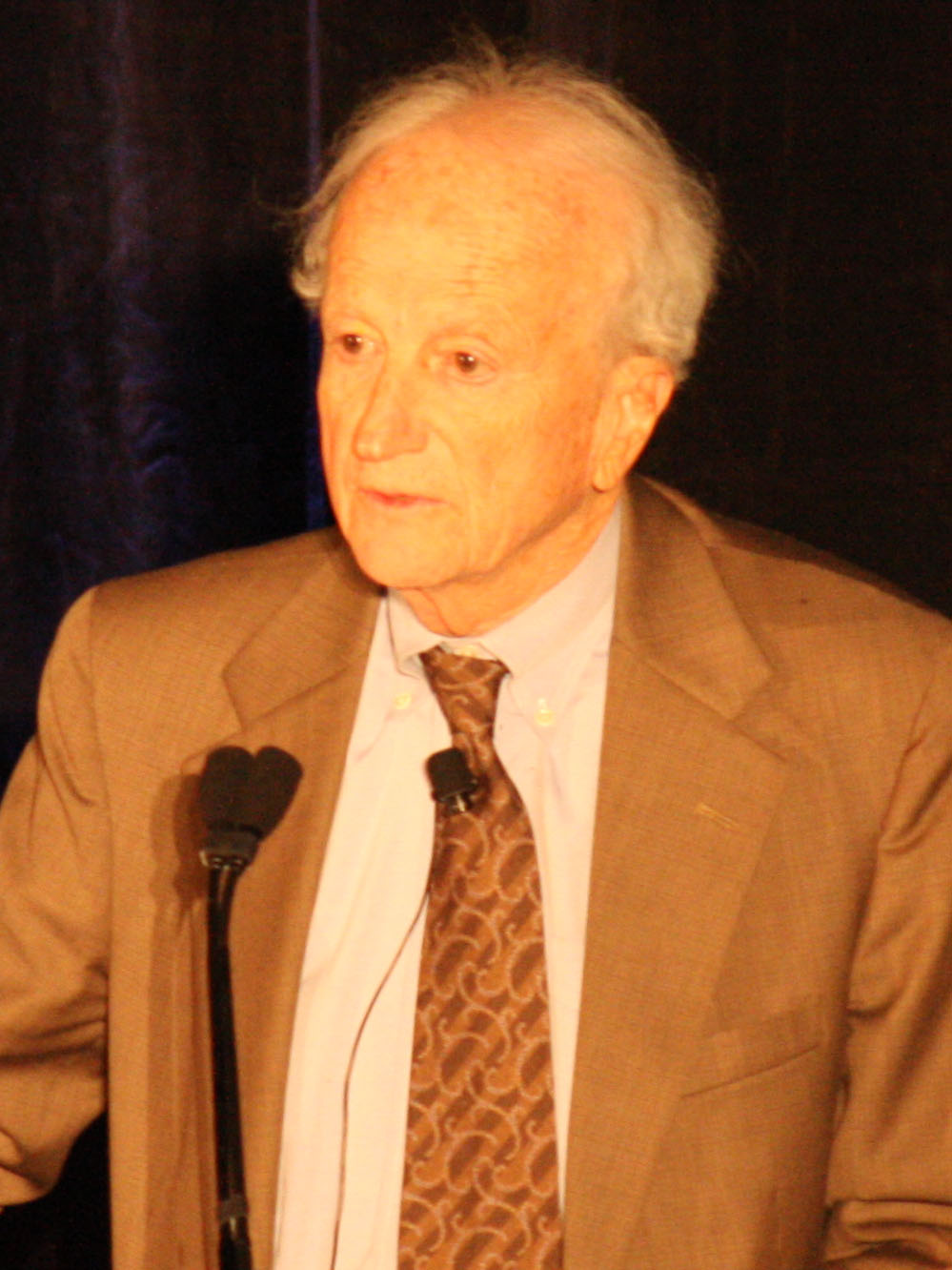
- Becker in 2008
- Born: Gary Stanley Becker; December 2, 1930; Pottsville, Pennsylvania, U.S.
- Died: May 3, 2014 (aged 83); Chicago, Illinois, U.S.

Academic background
- Education: Princeton University (BA); University of Chicago (PhD)
- Doctoral advisor: H. Gregg Lewis
- Influences: Milton Friedman; Theodore Schultz

Academic work
- Discipline: Economics
- School or tradition: Chicago School of Economics
- Institutions: Columbia University (1957–1968); University of Chicago (1968–2014)
- Doctoral students: David O. Meltzer; Russ Roberts; Walter Block; Shoshana Grossbard; Darius Lakdawalla; Rodrigo R. Soares
- Notable ideas: A Treatise on the Family (1981); Human capital Rotten kid theorem
- Awards: John Bates Clark Medal (1967); Nobel Memorial Prize in Economic Sciences (1992); Pontifical Academy of Sciences (1997); National Medal of Science (2000); John von Neumann Award (2004); Presidential Medal of Freedom (2007)

Gary Stanley Becker (/ˈbɛkər/; December 2, 1930 – May 3, 2014) was an American economist, professor of economics and sociology at the University of Chicago, and a leader of the third generation of the Chicago school of economics.

Becker was awarded the Nobel Memorial Prize in Economic Sciences in 1992 and received the United States Presidential Medal of Freedom in 2007. A 2011 survey of economics professors named Becker their favorite living economist over the age of 60, followed by Kenneth Arrow and Robert Solow. Economist Justin Wolfers called him "the most important social scientist in the past 50 years."

Becker was one of the first economists to analyze topics that had been researched in sociology, including racial discrimination, crime, family organization, and rational addiction. He argued that many different types of human behavior can be seen as rational and utility-maximizing, including those that are often regarded as self-destructive or irrational. His approach also extended to altruistic aspects of human behavior, which he showed to sometimes have self-serving ends (when individuals' utility is properly defined and measured, that is). He was also among the foremost exponents of the study of human capital. According to Milton Friedman, he was "the greatest social scientist who has lived and worked" in the second part of the twentieth century.

== Early life and education ==
Becker was born to a Jewish family in Pottsville, Pennsylvania. He received a BA from Princeton University in 1951, completing a senior thesis titled "The Theory of Multi-Country Trade". He then earned a PhD from the University of Chicago in 1955 with a thesis entitled The Economics of Discrimination. At Chicago, Becker was influenced by Milton Friedman, whom Becker called "by far the greatest living teacher I have ever had". Becker credits Friedman's course on microeconomics for helping to renew his interest in economics. Becker also noted that during his time at Chicago, there were several other economists that greatly influenced his future work, namely Gregg Lewis, T. W. Schultz, Aaron Director, and L. J. Savage.

== Career ==
For a few years, Becker worked as an assistant professor at Chicago and conducted research there. Before turning 30, he moved to teach at Columbia University in 1957 while also conducting research at the National Bureau of Economic Research. In 1970 Becker returned to the University of Chicago, and in 1983 was offered a joint appointment by the Sociology Department of Chicago. In 1965 he was elected as a Fellow of the American Statistical Association.

Becker was a founding partner of TGG Group, a business and philanthropy consulting company. Becker won the John Bates Clark Medal in 1967. He was elected a Fellow of the American Academy of Arts and Sciences in 1972, a member of the National Academy of Sciences in 1975, and a member of the American Philosophical Society in 1986. Becker was a member, and later the president of, the Mont Pelerin Society in 1990. Becker received the Nobel Prize in 1992 "for having extended the domain of microeconomic analysis to a wide range of human behavior and interaction, including nonmarket behavior". Becker also received the National Medal of Science in 2000. Becker received the Golden Plate Award of the American Academy of Achievement in 2001, presented by Awards Council member and Nobel Prize laureate Leon M. Lederman. Becker's work has over 200,000 citations on Google Scholar.

A political conservative, he wrote a monthly column for Business Week from 1985 to 2004, alternating with liberal Princeton economist Alan Blinder. In 1996 Becker was a senior adviser to Republican presidential candidate Robert Dole. In December 2004, Becker started a joint weblog with Judge Richard Posner entitled The Becker-Posner Blog.

== Economic analysis ==
Becker's work has been influential not only in economics but also other disciplines including sociology and demography. His most famous work is Human Capital, and he wrote on sociological topics as diverse as marriage, the family, criminal behavior, and racial discrimination.

=== Discrimination ===
Becker recognized that people (employers, customers, and employees) sometimes do not want to work with minorities because they have bias against the disadvantaged groups. He went on to say that discrimination increases a firm's cost because in discriminating against certain workers, the employer would have to pay more to other workers so that work can proceed without the biased ones. If the employer employs the minority, low wages can be provided, but more people can be employed, and productivity can be increased.

=== Politics ===
Becker's contributions to politics have come to be known as "Chicago political economy" of which he is considered one of the founding fathers.

Becker's insight was to recognize that deadweight losses put a brake on predation. He took the well-known insight that deadweight losses are proportional to the square of the tax, and used it to argue that a linear increase in takings by a predatory interest group will provoke a non-linear increase in the deadweight losses its victim suffers. These rapidly increasing losses will prod victims to invest equivalent sums in resisting attempts on their wealth. The advance of predators, fueled by linear incentives, slows before the stiffening resistance of prey outraged by non-linear damages.

=== Crime and punishment ===
Jurist Richard Posner has stressed the enormous influence of Becker's work which "has turned out to be a fount of economic writing on crime and its control", as well as the analytics of crime and punishment.

While Becker acknowledged that many people operate under a high moral and ethical constraint, criminals rationally see that the benefits of their crime outweigh the cost which depends upon the probability of apprehension, conviction, and punishment, and their current set of opportunities. From a public policy perspective, since the cost of increasing a fine is trivial in comparison to the cost of increasing surveillance, one can conclude that the best policy is to maximize the fine and minimize surveillance.

=== Human capital ===
In his 1964 book Human Capital Theories Becker introduced the economic concept of human capital. This book is now a classic in economic research and Becker went on to become a defining proponent of the Chicago school of economics. The book was republished in 1975 and 1993. Becker considered labor economics to be part of capital theory. He mused that "economists and plan-makers have fully agreed with the concept of investing on human beings".

Becker’s work on human capital changed how economists think about education and skills. He argued that people gain economic value when they invest in things like schooling, training, and health, similar to how companies invest in machines or technology. This idea helped explain why workers with more education often earn higher wages and why countries benefit when they support learning and skill development. Becker’s approach also shaped later research on how people choose to improve their skills and how governments can design programs that strengthen the workforce. His theory became important in discussions about income differences, showing that part of the wage gap comes from differences in investment in knowledge and abilities. While some scholars say human capital theory does not fully address social and structural barriers, Becker’s ideas remain highly influential and continue to guide research on education, labor markets, and economic growth.

=== Modern household economics ===
Together, Becker and Jacob Mincer founded Modern Household Economics, sometimes called the New Home Economics (NHE), in the 1960s at the labor workshop at Columbia University that they both directed. Shoshana Grossbard, who was a student of Becker at the University of Chicago, first published a history of the NHE at Columbia and Chicago in 2001. After receiving feedback from the NHE founders she revised her account.

Among the first publications in Modern Household Economics were Becker (1960) on fertility, Mincer (1962) on women's labor supply, and Becker (1965) on the allocation of time. Students and faculty who attended the Becker-Mincer workshop at Columbia in the 1960s and have published in the NHE tradition include Andrea Beller, Barry Chiswick, Carmel Chiswick, Victor Fuchs, Michael Grossman, Robert Michael, June E. O'Neill, Sol Polachek, and Robert Willis. James Heckman was also influenced by the NHE tradition and attended the labor workshop at Columbia from 1969 until his move to the University of Chicago. The NHE may be seen as a subfield of family economics.

In 2013, responding to a lack of women in top positions in the United States, Becker told the Wall Street Journal reporter David Wessel, "A lot of barriers [to women and blacks] have been broken down. That's all for the good. It's much less clear what we see today is the result of such artificial barriers. Going home to take care of the kids when the man doesn't: Is that a waste of a woman's time? There's no evidence that it is." This view was criticized by Charles Jones, stating that, "Productivity could be 9 percent to 15 percent higher, potentially, if all barriers were eliminated."

=== Home production ===
In the mid-1960s, Becker and Kelvin Lancaster developed the economic concept of a household production function. Both assumed that consumers in a household receive utility from the goods they purchase. Such as for example, when consumers purchase raw food. If it is cooked, a utility arises from the meal. In 1981 Becker published Treatise on the Family, where he stressed the importance of division of labor and gains from specification.

=== Economics of the family ===
During Becker's time at Chicago in the 1970s, he mostly focused on the family. He had previously done work on birth rates and family size, and he used this time to expand his understanding of how economics works within a family. Some specific family issues covered during this time were marriage, divorce, altruism toward other members of the family, investments by parents in their children, and long-term changes in what families do. All of Becker's research on the family resulted in A Treatise on the Family (1981). Throughout the decade, he contributed new ideas and information, and in 1991 an expanded edition of the work was published. His research applies basic economic assumptions such as maximizing behavior, preferences, and equilibrium to the family. He analyzed determinants for marriage and divorce, family size, parents' allocation of time to their children, and changes in wealth over several generations. This publication was an extensive overview of the economics of the family and helped to unite economics with other fields like sociology and anthropology.

==== Rotten kid theorem ====
At the core of Becker's economic theory on the family, which he developed on the basis of figures for United States families in 1981, is the "rotten kid theorem". He applied the economics of an altruist to a family, wherein a person takes actions that improve the well-being of another person, despite more self-interested action being feasible. Becker pointed out that a parent forgoes higher income, by focusing on family work commitments in order to maximize a well-meaning objective. Becker also theorized that a child in a US family may be perfectly selfish because it maximizes its own utility. There have been attempts to test this economic thesis, in the course of which it was found that cross-generational families do not necessarily maximize their joint income.

=== Organ markets ===
A 2007 article by Gary Becker and Julio Jorge Elias entitled "Introducing Incentives in the market for live and cadaveric organ donations" posited that a free market could help solve the problem of a scarcity in organ transplants. Their economic modeling was able to estimate the price tag for human kidneys (about US$15,000) and human livers (about US$32,000). It is argued by critics that this particular market would exploit the underprivileged donors from the developing world.

== Household Specialization model and feminist critiques ==
Gary Becker’s household specialization model applied neoclassical rational choice theory to family life by treating the household as a single unit that maximizes utility through labor specialization. In this view, partners divide time between market work and home production according to comparative advantage, typically placing men in paid labor and women in domestic labor. Becker presented these outcomes as efficient responses to incentives and stable preferences rather than as products of culture or power. Feminist and cultural economists later argued that this model embeds existing gender norms while presenting itself as neutral. They contended that what appears as efficient specialization often reflects unequal labor-market access, discrimination, and socially shaped expectations. Building on and critiquing Becker, feminist economists developed bargaining and intrahousehold power models that incorporate negotiation, outside options, and the value of unpaid labor, offering a more realistic account of how decisions are made and how inequalities emerge within a household.

== Personal life ==
Becker's first wife was Doria Slote. They were married from 1954 until her death in 1970. The marriage produced two daughters, Catherine Becker and Judy Becker. About ten years later, in 1980 Becker married Guity Nashat, an Iranian historian of the Middle East whose research interests overlapped his own.

In 2014 Becker died in Chicago, Illinois, aged 83, due to surgical complications. The same year, he was honored in a three-day conference organized at the University of Chicago.

== Selected publications ==
- Gary Becker (1993) [1964]. Human capital: a theoretical and empirical analysis, with special reference to education (3rd ed.). Chicago: The University of Chicago Press. ISBN 9780226041209.
- Gary Becker (September 1965). "A theory of the allocation of time". The Economic Journal. 75 (299): 493–517. doi:10.2307/2228949. JSTOR 2228949.
- Gary Becker (December 1966). "Una teoría de la distribución del tiempo". Estudios Económicos. 5 (9/10): 71–112. doi:10.52292/j.estudecon.1966.1032. S2CID 245198057.
- Gary Becker (1968), "Discrimination, economic", in Sills, David L. (ed.), International Encyclopedia of Social Sciences, Vol. 4 Cumu to Elas, New York, New York: Macmillan, pp. 208–210
- Gary Becker (March 1968). "Crime and punishment: an economic approach". Journal of Political Economy. 76 (2): 169–217. doi:10.1086/259394. Archived from the original on October 23, 2023.
- Gary Becker (1969), "An economic analysis of fertility", in National Bureau of Economic Research (ed.), Demographic and economic change in developed countries, a conference of the universities, New York: Columbia University Press, pp. 209–240, ISBN 9780870143021
- Gary Becker (1971). The economics of discrimination. Chicago: University of Chicago Press. ISBN 9780226041049.
- Gary Becker (1971) [1957]. The economics of discrimination. Chicago: University of Chicago Press. ISBN 9780226041155.
- Gary Becker; H. Gregg Lewis (March 1973). "On the interaction between the quantity and quality of children" (PDF). Journal of Political Economy. 81 (2): 279–288. doi:10.1086/260166. S2CID 152624744.
- Gary Becker (July 1973). "A theory of marriage: part I". Journal of Political Economy. 81 (4): 813–846. doi:10.1086/260084. S2CID 152514496.
- Gary Becker (1974). Essays in the economics of crime and punishment. New York: National Bureau of Economic Research distributed by Columbia University Press. ISBN 9780870142635.
- Gary Becker (March 1974). "A theory of marriage: part II". Journal of Political Economy. 82 (2): 11–26. doi:10.1086/260287. S2CID 222442284.
- Gary Becker (November 1974). "A theory of social interactions" (PDF). Journal of Political Economy. 82 (6): 1063–1093. doi:10.1086/260265. S2CID 145041880.
- Gary Becker; Gilbert Ghez (1975). The allocation of time and goods over the life cycle. New York: National Bureau of Economic Research Distributed by Columbia University Press. ISBN 9780870145148.
- Gary Becker (1976), "Price and prejudice", in Becker, Gary S. (ed.), The economic approach to human behavior, Chicago: University of Chicago Press, pp. 15–17, ISBN 9780226041124
- Gary Becker; George J. Stigler (March 1977). "De gustibus non est disputandum". The American Economic Review. 67 (2): 76–90.
- Gary Becker; Elizabeth Landes; Robert T. Michael (December 1977). "An economic analysis of marital instability". Journal of Political Economy. 85 (6): 1147–1187. doi:10.1086/260631. JSTOR 1837421. S2CID 53494363.
- Gary Becker (1991) [1981]. A treatise on the family. Cambridge, Massachusetts: Harvard University Press. ISBN 9780674906983.
- Gary Becker (August 1983). "A theory of competition among pressure groups for political influence". Quarterly Journal of Economics. 98 (3): 371–400. doi:10.2307/1886017. JSTOR 1886017.
- Gary Becker (January 1985). "Human capital, effort, and the sexual division of labor". Journal of Labor Economics. 3 (1): 33–58.
- Gary Becker; Kevin M. Murphy (August 1988). "A theory of rational addiction". Journal of Political Economy. 96 (4): 675–700. doi:10.1086/261558. hdl:10419/262443. S2CID 6421803.
- Gary Becker (December 9, 1992). "Nobel prize lecture: the economic way of looking at life". nobelprize.org. Nobel Media AB.
- Gary Becker (1996). Accounting for tastes. Cambridge, Massachusetts: Harvard University Press. ISBN 9780674543560.
- Gary Becker; Guity Nashat Becker (1997). The economics of life: from baseball to affirmative action to immigration, how real-world issues affect our everyday life. McGraw-Hill. ISBN 9780070067097.
- Gary Becker; Kevin M. Murphy (2000). Social economics market behavior in a social environment. Belknap Press of Harvard University Press. ISBN 9780674011212.
- Gary Becker; Julio Jorge Elías (May 2007). "Introducing incentives in the market for live and cadaveric organ donations". Journal of Economic Perspectives. 21 (3): 3–24. doi:10.1257/jep.21.3.3. PMID 19728419.
- Gary Becker (2012), "When illegals stop crossing the border", in Miniter, Brendan (ed.), The 4% solution unleashing the economic growth America needs, New York: Crown Business, ISBN 9780307986153

== See also ==
- Social capital
- List of Jewish Nobel laureates

Awards
Preceded by Ronald H. Coase	Laureate of the Nobel Memorial Prize in Economics; 1992	Succeeded by Robert W. Fogel; Douglass C. North
