= Bloomington school =

The Bloomington school or Bloomington school of political economy is a new institutionalist research tradition in political science, economics, sociology, and public administration associated with the work of Elinor Ostrom and Vincent Ostrom at Indiana University Bloomington. The school focuses on governance, collective action, and institutional diversity, particularly in relation to common-pool resources (CPRs), decentralization, and self-governance. It is renowned for its interdisciplinary approach, blending political science, economics, and public administration to understand how individuals and communities organize themselves to solve collective problems.

== Origins and development ==
The Bloomington School emerged in the mid-20th century at Indiana University Bloomington, where Vincent and Elinor Ostrom, along with their colleagues and students, developed a unique approach to studying governance. The Ostroms founded the Workshop in Political Theory and Policy Analysis in 1973, which became the institutional home for research on self-governance and institutional diversity.

Vincent Ostrom, influenced by the work of Friedrich Hayek, Michael Polanyi, and the public choice tradition, critiqued centralized bureaucratic models of governance and emphasized polycentricity, the idea that multiple governing authorities can coexist and interact at different scales. Elinor Ostrom further expanded on these ideas, particularly through empirical studies of common-pool resources, leading to her development of the Institutional Analysis and Development (IAD) framework.

== Key contributions ==
=== Polycentric Governance ===
Vincent Ostrom introduced the concept of polycentric governance, arguing that multiple, overlapping, and autonomous decision-making centers can improve efficiency, accountability, and problem-solving. This idea challenged the traditional dichotomy between centralized government control and privatization, suggesting that self-organizing systems often outperform top-down solutions.

=== Institutional Analysis and Development (IAD) Framework ===
Elinor Ostrom and her colleagues developed the Institutional Analysis and Development (IAD) framework, a tool for analyzing institutions—both formal and informal—by examining their rules, participants, and outcomes. The framework has been widely used to study governance structures across different contexts, from local fisheries to global environmental agreements.

=== Common-Pool Resource (CPR) Management ===
Elinor Ostrom's most famous work, Governing the Commons (1990), challenged the conventional wisdom of the "tragedy of the commons" by demonstrating that communities around the world have successfully managed common-pool resources through local governance structures. Her research identified "eight design principles" that contribute to the success of CPR governance, including clearly defined boundaries, collective decision-making, monitoring, graduated sanctions, and conflict-resolution mechanisms.

=== Public Choice and Constitutional Governance ===
The Bloomington School is closely aligned with public choice theory, particularly in its emphasis on how individuals make decisions within different governance structures. Vincent Ostrom, in his work The Meaning of Democracy and the Vulnerability of Democracies (1997), explored how constitutional arrangements shape democratic stability and citizen engagement.

=== Empirical Case Studies and Methodology ===
The Bloomington School has employed a variety of research methods, including fieldwork, case studies, and experimental studies. Elinor Ostrom's work utilized institutional ethnography, examining local governance structures in Nepal, Kenya, Indonesia, and the United States, among other places. The use of comparative analysis allowed the school to challenge universalist assumptions about governance and economic organization.

== Impact ==
Elinor Ostrom was awarded the Nobel Memorial Prize in Economic Sciences in 2009, becoming the first woman to receive the prize in this category. Her recognition highlighted the significance of the Bloomington School's work in bridging disciplines and providing alternatives to centralized governance paradigms.

The Bloomington School's influence extends beyond academia, shaping policies related to environmental governance, local government reform, and community-driven development. Organizations such as the World Bank, United Nations Development Programme (UNDP), and International Association for the Study of the Commons (IASC) have incorporated their principles into policy frameworks.

While widely influential, the Bloomington School has faced critiques from various perspectives. Some economists argue that Ostrom's findings on CPR management are difficult to scale up to national or global levels. Others question the applicability of polycentric governance in contexts with weak institutional capacity or high levels of corruption. Additionally, scholars from Marxist and critical political economy traditions have criticized the school for not sufficiently addressing power dynamics and inequalities in governance structures.

The Bloomington School remains an active and evolving research tradition. The Ostrom Workshop, renamed the Ostrom Workshop in Political Theory and Policy Analysis, continues to foster interdisciplinary research and training on governance, commons management, and institutional diversity. Scholars influenced by the Bloomington School, such as Michael McGinnis, Tina Nabatchi, and Daniel Cole, have extended its work into areas such as digital commons, climate governance, and networked governance. The school's emphasis on empirical research, institutional analysis, and polycentric governance continues to shape debates in political science, economics, and public administration.

== Literature ==
- Ostrom, Elinor. Governing the Commons: The Evolution of Institutions for Collective Action. Cambridge University Press, 1990.
- Ostrom, Vincent. The Meaning of Democracy and the Vulnerability of Democracies: A Response to Tocqueville's Challenge. University of Michigan Press, 1997.
- Poteete, Amy R., Marco A. Janssen, and Elinor Ostrom. Working Together: Collective Action, the Commons, and Multiple Methods in Practice. Princeton University Press, 2010.
