= Fadi Farra =

Lebanese scientist and author (born 1973)

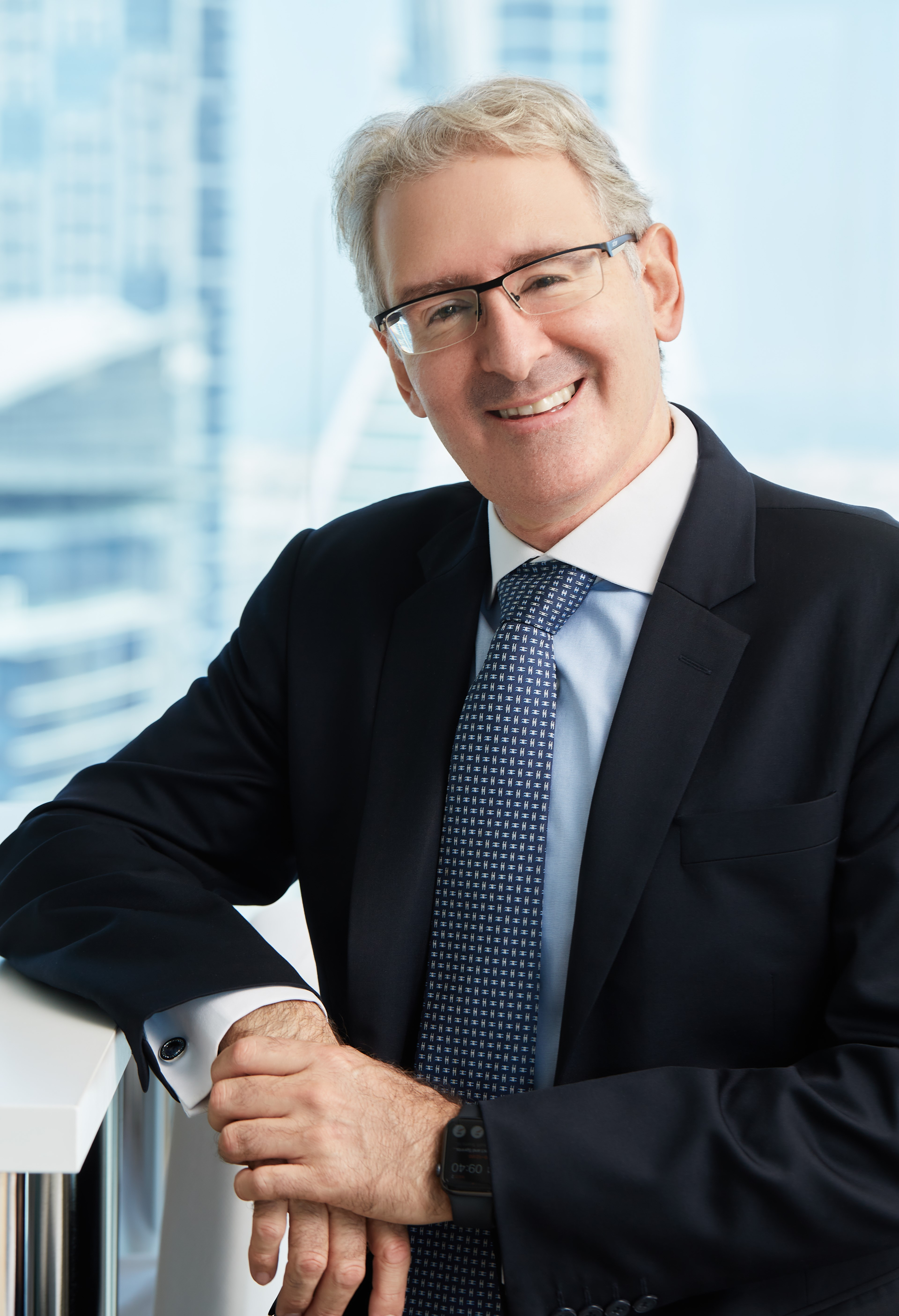
- Born: June 10, 1973 (age 52); Beirut, Lebanon
- Occupations: Scientist, author, strategy consultant
- Years active: 2000s–present
- Awards: Global Leaders in Consulting – Excellence in Innovation (2019); Top 25 Consultants – Excellence in the Public Sector (2021)

Fadi Farra (born 10 June 1973) is a Lebanese-French scientist, author, and the founder of Whiteshield Partners. Farra's work focuses on industrial policies, innovation, microeconomics, and private sector development. Previously, he served as a head of unit at the Organisation for Economic Co-operation and Development (OECD) in Paris, and worked as a strategy consultant with firms such as the Boston Consulting Group and AT Kearney.

== Early life and education ==
Farra was born on 10 June 1973, in Beirut, Lebanon. He holds an M.Sc. in Management Economics from the London School of Economics, an M.Sc. in International Management from HEC Paris / Community of European Management Schools, and an M.A. in government from the Institut D'Etudes Politiques d'Aix-en-Provence.

== Career ==
Farra is the Founder and Managing Partner at Whiteshield. He previously worked at Boston Consulting Group and Kearney. He is a former academic and lecturer in Public Policy at the Harvard Kennedy School of Government. He has also chaired the Global Agenda Council on the Future of Manufacturing Council of the World Economic Forum. From 2007 to 2011, he was Head of Unit at the Organisation for Economic Cooperation and Development in Paris.

In 2011, Farra founded Whiteshield Partners in London. In 2019, he was recognized by Consulting Magazine as one of the Global Leaders in Consulting, receiving an award for 'Excellence in Innovation'. In 2021, Consulting Magazine included him in their list of Top 25 Consultants with Excellence in the Public Sector. In July 2023, Whiteshield announced the publication of The Quantum Governance, a book written by Fadi Farra and co-authored by Sir Christopher Pissarides, Nobel Prize winner in Economics and Advisor and Director at Whiteshield.

== Publications ==
- Quantum Governance: Rewiring the Foundation of Public Policy. Fadi Farra, Co-author, Sir Christopher Pissarides, foreword by David Bell, Emerald Publishing Limited, 2023 ISBN 9-781-83753779-2
- Sustainable Development Goals and Capability Development, UNDP, Whiteshield, 2016
- The Future of Manufacturing: Driving Capabilities, Enabling Investments, Global Agenda Council on the Future of Manufacturing, World Economic Forum, Whiteshield, 2014
- Improving regional performance in Russia: A capability-based approach, European Bank for Reconstruction and Development, Harvard Business Review, 2013
- Competitiveness challenges in Central Asia and Kazakhstan, Harvard International Review, 2012
- Unlocking the manufacturing potential of Egypt – UNIDO – Whiteshield
- Manufacturing capabilities & innovation in Tunisia and Morocco – EBRD – Whiteshield
- Eastern Europe and South Caucasus Competitiveness Outlook, OECD
- Opportunities in India, Forum (USA)
- Opportunities in China, Forum (USA)
- Central Asia Competitiveness Outlook, OECD
- Sector-specific source of competitiveness in the Western Balkans, OECD
- Competitiveness Strategy for the Republic of Moldova, OECD
- The potential of Ukraine, Wall Street Journal
- Emerging market priorities for global retailers, European Business Review, Harvard Business School- in collaboration with David Bell
- Economic perspectives, Wall Street Journal
