= G. D. N. Worswick =

British economist (1916–2001)

George David Norman Worswick CBE (1916–2001), also known as David Worswick, was an Oxford economist specialising in understanding of the UK's economy from a Keynesian perspective.

Whilst mathematically well trained, like Alfred Marshall, he became dubious about the use of mathematics in economics arguing against those who tried to avoid the difficult parts of economic problems by resorting to solvable simple equations. He was also critical of econometricians arguing that: they are not, it seems to me, engaged in forging tools to arrange and measure actual facts so much as making a marvellous array of pretend-tools which would perform wonders if ever a set of facts should turn up in the right form. Thus what was said above about the detached mathematical nature of much economic theory also goes for some econometric theory as well. But he counterbalances these criticisms by arguing that econometrics has been a powerful force in bringing economic theory back into touch with reality.

== Career ==
- Researcher, Oxford University Institute of Statistics 1940–60
- Fellow and Tutor in Economics, Magdalen College, Oxford 1945-65 (Emeritus)
- Visiting Professor Economics, Massachusetts Institute of Technology, Cambridge, MA, USA 1963–64
- Senior Tutor 1955–57, Vice-president 1963–65
- Director National Institute of Economic and Social Research 1965-82

== Awards and prestigious academic posts ==
- FBA 1979;
- Commander of the Order of the British Empire (CBE) 1981 Birthday Honours;
- President, Royal Economic Society 1982–84;

== Key publications ==
- (1952) (with Peter Ady) The British Economy 1945-1950
- (1962) (with Peter Ady) The British Economy in the Nineteen-Fifties
- (1991) Unemployment: A Problem of Policy. Analysis of British Experience and Prospects. Cambridge: Cambridge University Press/National Institute of Economic and Social Research, ISBN 0-521-40034-1

== Personal life ==
Worswick married Sylvia Walsh. They had three children together, including their daughter Eleanor (married to television producer Tom Stanier), who was active in local politics in Richmond-upon-Thames and served as the London borough's mayor in 2001/02.

== Other sources ==
Obituary - Royal Economic Society Newsletter Issue no. 114 July 2001
