= National Institute of Economic and Social Research =

Independent economic research institute in Britain

- Abbreviation: NIESR
- Formation: 1938
- Type: research institute think tank
- Headquarters: 2 Dean Trench St, Westminster, London SW1P 3HE
- Location: London, England
- Coordinates: 51°29′45.5″N 0°7′41.1″W
- President: Sir Paul Tucker
- Chair: Sir Philip Rutnam
- Director: David Aikman
- Staff: circa 45
- Website: niesr.ac.uk

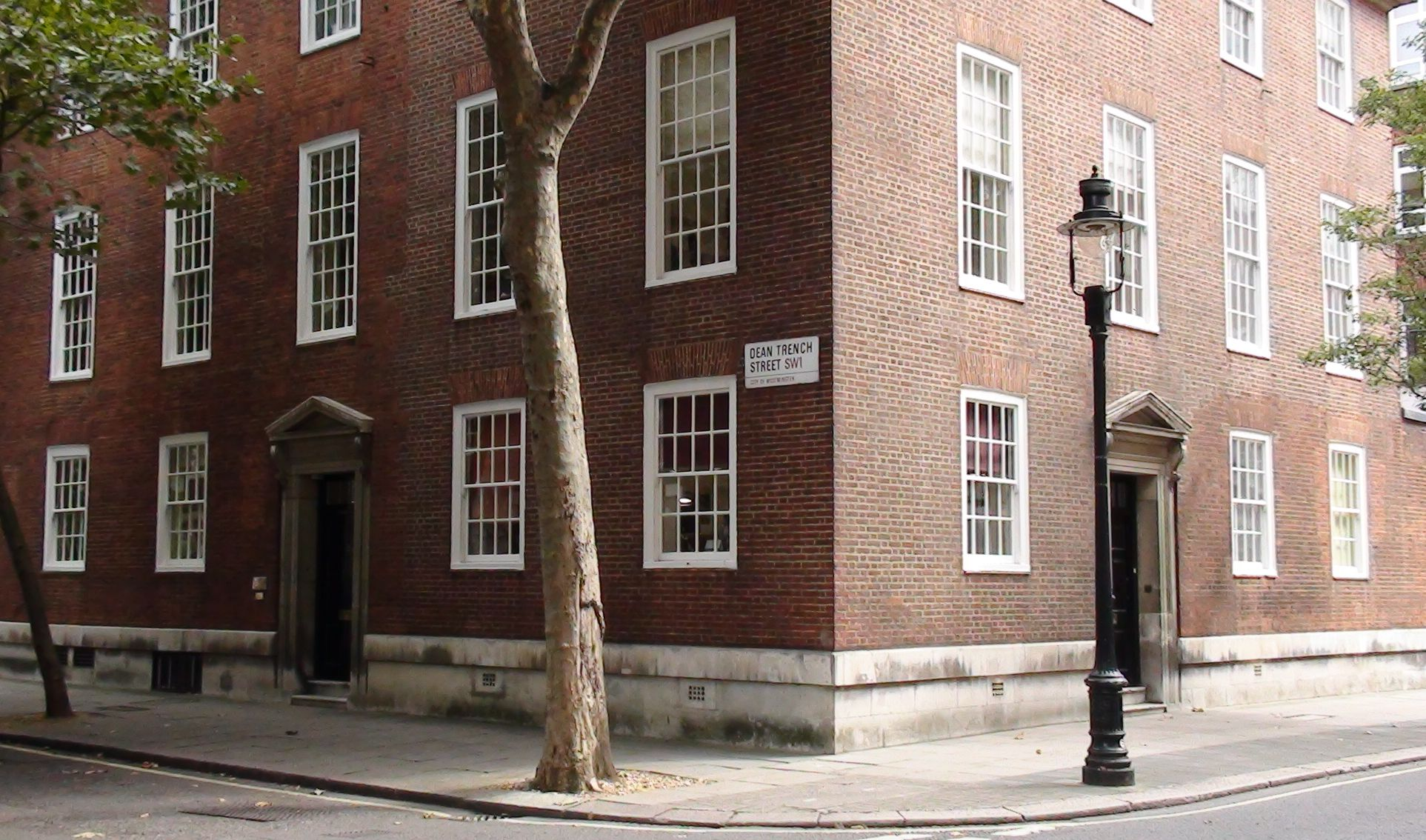
National Institute of Economic and Social Research

The National Institute of Economic and Social Research (NIESR), established in 1938, is Britain's oldest independent economic research institute. The institute is a London-based independent UK registered charity that carries out academic research of relevance to business and policy makers, both nationally and internationally.

The institute receives no core funding from government or other sources. The bulk of funding comes from research projects awarded or commissioned by a variety of sources, including government, all acknowledged in full in their published materials. The terms of their grants prohibit any involvement from funding bodies in determining or influencing content. Funders include government departments and agencies, the research councils (particularly the Economic and Social Research Council (ESRC)), charitable foundations, the European Commission, and the private sector.

The institute is a partner with the ESRC's Centre for Macroeconomics and The Productivity Institute, and is responsible for the Productivity Commission. It also has close ties with both Cardiff and Glasgow universities.

== History ==
=== Origins (1930s) ===
The foundation of NIESR was preceded by an initiative launched by Sir Josiah Stamp in the early 1930s Stamp, who was the President of the London, Midland and Scottish Railway, aimed to develop a central unit of British origin with funds under its control to supplement, and eventually replace, the help given by the Rockefeller Foundation (then the primary source of research funds in the British social sciences). Stamp sought to develop an increasingly large research effort in economics and related subjects in response to the general feeling that the existing emphasis on theory needed to be balanced by an increase in applied research

Stamp garnered support from prominent academics including William Beveridge, Director of the London School of Economics (LSE); Henry Clay, Economic Adviser to the Bank of England; and Hubert Henderson, Secretary of the Economic Advisory Panel . In 1934–1935, Stamp, with the assistance of Noel Hall, attempted to secure funding from several trusts, including Halley Stewart, Leverhulme, Rockefeller, and the Pilgrim Trust. The Halley Stewart trustees provided an initial grant of £600 to explore the formation of an institute.

In setting up the institute, the objective was the formation of a national organisation for carrying out independent economic research, as existing university developments, such as LSE's, were not perceived as meeting this need. Beveridge eventually became actively involved, suggesting the inclusion of the word 'social' in the title, thus changing the proposed National Institute of Economic Research to the National Institute of Economic and Social Research.

The Institute was founded in 1938. Initial financial support was secured from the Pilgrim Trust, the trustees of the late Lord Leverhulme, and the Halley Stewart trustees, with the Rockefeller Foundation matching their contributions pound for pound, totalling £10,000 annually for seven years.

=== Early Research and Wartime ===
Following the formal establishment, research schemes that focused heavily on quantitative economics were immediately solicited, with a small grant being made to a group of economists at Cambridge under John Maynard Keynes' chairmanship for work on economic change. Other areas of study included national income, unemployment, location of industry, credit and money markets, and commercial policy. The investigation into national income culminated in the publication of Studies in the National Income 1924–1938, edited by A.L. Bowley, in 1942. This marked the first publication in NIESR's series of economic and social studies.

At the outbreak of World War II, most staff members entered government service, resulting in the suspension or curtailment of several investigations. From 1941 until 1952, the business of the Institute was conducted by an Executive Committee, with the Secretary, Miss Feodora Leontinoff (later Mrs. Stone), playing an active role. Sir Henry Clay, who succeeded Lord Stamp as Chairman in 1941, carried out the duties of a Director throughout the war and early postwar years. During the war, the Institute was able to recruit able immigrants, leading to pioneering comparisons of industrial productivity in Britain and the United States by Laci Rastas.

=== Postwar Developments and Macroeconomic Shift ===
After the war, NIESR decided to focus its limited resources on internal research, concentrating on the structure and productivity of the national economy. This emphasis was influenced by the growth of statistical data made available by the government. In 1955, NIESR made a significant change in direction by deciding to take on the function of a Konjunktur (business cycle) institute. This shift, driven by Christopher Dow and Bryan Hopkin, aimed to publish regular analyses and forecasts of the economy to provide an independent check on the government's assessments, particularly those from HM Treasury. This ambition was backed by Sir Robert Hall, the Economic Adviser to the Government. This new venture led to the launch of the National Institute Economic Review (NIER) in January 1959. The forecasts published in the Review were typically based on the assumption of unchanged policies, serving to highlight potential needs for policy changes.

NIESR achieved prominence in macroeconomic modelling in the 1970s and 1980s. By 1975/6, public funds accounted for about 80 per cent of NIESR’s total income, although this share declined significantly to just under half by 1987/8. NIESR developed its own internal model, Model 6, which incorporated fully endogenous wage and exchange-rate movements, and later Model 8, which included forward-looking expectations. In 1983, when the Economic and Social Research Council (ESRC, renamed from SSRC in 1984) established a Macroeconomic Modelling Bureau at the University of Warwick, NIESR collaborated fully, and their model was found to be the most 'data coherent' among those examined.

== Areas of Research ==
NIESR focuses on producing high-quality, policy-relevant research to inform debate and improve understanding of key economic and social issues. Its core focus is on the United Kingdom, however – given the UK is a relatively small open economy, as well as being a global financial centre – it uses its modelling expertise to understand the effect any changes in the global context may have.

NIESR’s research can be broken down into the following areas:

=== Macro-financial policy frameworks ===
Work here is focused on UK Monetary and fiscal policy – how they interact, how they have adapted to changing conditions and how they have performed. Topics that continue to be explored include the role of quantitative easing and quantitative tightening, the sustainability of the public finances, factors affecting inflation, and the global financial system.

=== Catalysts of long-run growth and competitiveness ===
What are the structural forces that determine the UK’s capacity to grow and compete? Topics here include analysing the UK’s poor productivity performance - working with The Productivity Institute and hosting the Productivity Commission to investigate factors and propose solutions – as well as understanding the labour market, climate change, international trade factors and issues affecting demographics, such as migration.

=== Regional and distributional analysis ===
The focus on people and places, and the impact that economic policy decisions have on them, grounds NIESR’s research so it connects directly to policy debates. NIESR has a suite of regional and distributional economic models that it uses to explore the drivers of regional productivity and the effects of policies on households across income levels.

== Macroeconomic Modelling ==
=== NiGEM ===
The National Institute Global Econometric Model (NiGEM) is recognized as the leading global macroeconomic model. It is a peer-reviewed tool that has evolved over more than 30 years of regular use.

==== History and Origins ====
NiGEM was first developed in 1987 as part of a new approach to world economy forecasting and the analysis of policy cooperation possibilities among major countries. The model was devised by Simon Wren-Lewis. The global model's starting point was the Treasury's world model, which NIESR adapted and expanded in various ways. NiGEM quickly became the leading world model developed in the UK and one of the leading world models used internationally. Major advances in its specification continued in the 1990s, with Ray Barrell in charge of this work at the Institute, often in cooperation with the London Business School.

==== Structure and Scope ====
NiGEM is structured as a Global model consisting of individual country and regional models that are linked through trade in goods and services and integrated capital markets. It represents a "closed world" where outflows from one country or region are matched by inflows into others. The model’s coverage includes:

- Europe: 30 countries plus 3 regions.
- America: 6 countries plus 1 region.
- Asia/Australia: 12 countries plus 1 region.
- Africa/Middle East: 2 countries plus 2 regions.

NiGEM contains over 7,500 variables and more than 10,000 model equations.

As an Econometric model, its key behavioural equations are estimated using historical data to ensure that the dynamics and elasticities fit the main characteristics of individual country data. Theoretically, NiGEM is classified as a global general equilibrium macroeconomic model, balancing theoretical rigor with empirical evidence. It is built upon a broadly New Keynesian structure incorporating features common to dynamic stochastic general equilibrium (DSGE) models, such as sticky prices, rational or model-consistent expectations, endogenous monetary policy (often based on a Taylor rule), and long-run fiscal solvency.

The country models are grounded in the national income identity and define domestic demand, trade volumes, prices, current accounts, and asset holdings. The long-run equilibrium is anchored by supply inputs—including labour, capital, and energy (disaggregated into coal, oil, gas, and non-fossil fuels) . The underlying production function shows that potential output is influenced by productive capital stock, potential labor input, technical progress, effective energy input, and a scaling factor that is a function of the terms of trade.

==== Integration of Climate Analysis ====
A significant recent development is the NiGEM Climate Model, which was initiated in 2018. This separate component of the model is designed to provide an understanding of the macroeconomic effects of climate change and extreme weather events. The Climate Model integrates key policy channels, such as a carbon tax and border carbon adjustments, into NiGEM’s well-established macroeconomic framework. This allows the analysis of interactions between the macroeconomy and climate-related shocks and policy instruments.

=== NiREMS and LINDA ===
NIESR also produces a regional economic model, called NiREMS (National Institute Regional Economic Modelling System), which combines data from NiGEM and LINDA to create economic projections for the 12 Government Regions of the UK. LINDA (Lifetime Income Distributional Analysis) is a microsimulation model, which simulates individual level data over periods of time, accounting for diverse socio-economic parameters.

=== Nowcasting the UK Economy ===
Each month NIESR tracks a series of key economic indicators, including Consumer Price Index (CPI) inflation, Gross Domestic Product (GDP) and Wages, and uses this data to forecast the future of the UK economy. In addition, each quarter they publish a Term Premium Tracker and, from February 2021 until February 2022 during the pandemic, tracked UK Covid-19 infection rates.

== People ==
=== Former Directors ===
- Sir Noel Hall (appointed 1937)
- Geoffrey Crowther (served as Acting Director, appointed 1940)
- Sir Henry Clay (1941-1952)
- Sir Bryan Hopkin (1952-1957)
- Christopher Saunders (1957–1965)
- David Worswick (1965–1982)
- Andrew Britton (1982–1995)
- Martin Weale (1995–2011)
- Jonathan Portes (2011–2015)
- Dame Frances Cairncross (acting director, 2015-2016)
- Jagjit S Chadha (2016–2024)
- David Aikman (2025-present)

=== Chairs of Council ===
- Lord Stamp (1937 - 1942)
- Sir Henry Clay (1942 - 1949)
- Humphrey Mynors (1949 -1954) and Austin Robinson (1949 – 1962)
- Lord Roberthall (1962 – 1971)
- Sir Hugh Week (1971 – 1974)
- Sir Donald MacDougall (1974 – 1987)
- Sir Kenneth Berrill (1987 – 1996)
- John Flemming (1996 – 2002)
- Professor Stephen Nickell (2002 – 2008)
- Professor Tim Besley (2008 – 2016)
- Professor Diane Coyle (2016 – 2020)
- Professor Nicholas Crafts (2020 – 2023)
- Sir Philip Rutnam (2024 -

=== Presidents ===
- Lord Stamp (1938 - 1941)
- Sir Hector Hetherington (1942 - 1945)
- The Earl of Woolton (1945 - 1949)
- Sir Henry Clay (1949 - 1952)
- Sir John Woods (1952 - 1955)
- Sir Paul Chambers (1955 – 1962)
- Lord Franks (1962-67)
- Lord Roll (1968-1986)
- Ronny Utiger (1986 - 1994)
- Sir Brian Corby (1994 – 2002)
- Lord Burns (2003 – 2010)
- Sir Nicholas Monck (2010 – 2013)
- Professor Sir Charles Bean (2013 – 2018)
- Sir Paul Tucker (2018 -

=== Governors ===
The Institute has nearly 150 Governors, who have a role in the accountability and governance of NIESR as a registered charity. They are drawn from academia, business, government and media, and include Ed Conway, Baron Terence Higgins, Rachel Lomax, Jesse Norman, Frances O'Grady, and Baroness Shriti Vadera. Governors also give monthly talks at the Institute, which are open to the public.

== Publications ==
=== National Institute Economic Review ===
Since 1959, the NIESR has published the National Institute Economic Review. Principal topics covered by the Review include economic modelling and analysis, education and training, productivity and competitiveness, and workings of the international economy. Each edition Includes detailed forecasts of both UK and World Economies, a commentary, and special articles by Institute researchers and external authors. Since 2021, the UK and Global Economic Outlook have been published in-house.

=== UK and Global Economic Outlook ===
Since 2021, the Institute has published its outlooks for the UK and Global economy online, with a limited print run in-house. Each is published quarterly following a Spring/Summer/Autumn/Winter pattern. The UK Outlook is free to view and download, whereas the Global publication requires a subscription.

== Events ==
Each year NIESR hold a regular series of events, including annual lectures to celebrate the work of Sig Prais, Christopher Dow, Phyllis Deane, and Richard Stone. In partnership with The Anglo-German Foundation, NIESR hosts a biennial lecture on public policy. A quarterly Business Conditions Forum brings together business leaders under Chatham House rules to discuss the latest topics driving the economy.

== Premises and Location ==
NIESR is currently located at 2 Dean Trench Street, Smith Square, London, SW1P 3HE, United Kingdom. The charity acquired the freehold of its premises in 1986.

The initial headquarters, established in 1938, was at 32 Gordon Square. During World War II, the premises suffered severe bomb damage in autumn 1940, forcing a temporary closure of its library. After temporary accommodation, the Institute moved to 2 Dean Trench Street in early 1942, but this house was subsequently wrecked by a flying bomb in July 1944. The premises were repaired and reoccupied at the end of 1946. In 1949, the Institute acquired 4 Dean Trench street, and by the end of 1951, the two houses were converted into a single headquarters.
