= Quantum Governance =

Book

- Author: Fadi Farra and Sir Christopher Pissarides
- Language: English
- Subject: Society & Economics
- Publisher: Emerald Publishing Limited
- Publication date: July 2023
- Pages: 232
- ISBN: 9781837537792

Quantum Governance is a book about citizen-centric global progress and rewiring the foundation of public policy, written by Fadi Farra and Sir Christopher Pissarides.

== Overview ==
The book was written by Fadi Farra in collaboration with Nobel Prize laureate in Economics, Sir Christopher Pissarides, and published in July 2023 as Quantum Governance: Rewiring the Foundation of Public Policy by Emerald Publishing Limited. Quantum Governance explores the fundamentals of AI economics and its application in shaping public policy. It delves into the concept of 'development' and the evolutionary dynamics of 'progress' within human civilization. The authors explore the transformation of human society, from the earliest urban settlements in Mesopotamia to the modern era's green smart cities, and from the initial agricultural societies to the contemporary knowledge economy. The book discusses how people and governments have built the world we live in and what the future might look like.

The book posits that questioning fundamental aspects of human development and progress has become an overlooked practice, both among individuals and policymakers. However, it emphasizes the significance of these foundational inquiries in shaping and understanding the boundaries of human civilization. "Quantum Governance" advocates for the rekindling of this introspective and analytical approach, particularly during times of crisis.
