= National Institute Economic Review =

- Discipline: Economics
- Language: English

Publication details
- History: 1959-present
- Publisher: Cambridge University Press on behalf of the National Institute of Economic and Social Research (United Kingdom)
- Frequency: Quarterly

Standard abbreviations
- ISO 4: Natl. Inst. Econ. Rev.

Indexing
- ISSN: 0027-9501 (print); 1741-3036 (web)

Links
- Journal homepage

The National Institute Economic Review is a British economics academic journal that is published quarterly by Cambridge University Press on behalf of the National Institute of Economic and Social Research. The journal principally focuses on modelling and analysis, education economics, productivity, and international economics. Each issue incorporates an overarching theme, in addition to topical commentary and forecasts.

== History ==
The first edition of the Review was published in January 1959, launched by the then Director of the National Institute, Christopher Saunders. The first Editor was Robert Neild. He was followed in 1961 by Alan Day who in turn was succeeded by Frank Blackaby in 1963.

== Editorial Board ==
The current editorial board can be found here.

== Abstracting and indexing ==
The National Institute Economic Review is abstracted and indexed in:

- Google Scholar
- Medline/PubMed
- PsycINFO
- Science Citation Index (SCI) - Clarivate
- Social Science Citation Index (SSCI) - Clarivate
- Scopus
