= Noel Frederick Hall =

British economist (1902–1983)

Sir Noel Frederick Hall
- Hall in 1941
- Born: 23 December 1902
- Died: 29 March 1983 (aged 80)
- Title: Principal of Brasenose College, Oxford (1960–1973)

Scholarly background
- Education: Brasenose College, Oxford; Princeton University

Scholarly work
- Discipline: Economics
- Institutions: University College London; National Institute of Economic and Social Research; Administrative Staff College; Brasenose College, Oxford

Sir Noel Frederick Hall (23 December 1902 – 29 March 1983) was an economist and academic who was one of Britain's earliest post-World War II specialists in business theory and education. He was Professor of Political Economy at University College London, co-founder of what is now Henley Business School and Principal of Brasenose College, Oxford.

== Biography ==
Noel Hall was born in 1902, the son of Cecil Gallopine Hall and Constance Gertrude Upcher. He was educated at the Royal Grammar School, Newcastle upon Tyne, and at Bromsgrove School, before going up to Brasenose as an undergraduate in 1921, where he took a first in Modern History (1924) and a distinction in the Oxford University Certificate in Social Anthropology (1925). He was then granted a newly created Commonwealth Fund (Harkness) fellowship to study Economics at Princeton University, where he was awarded a Master of Arts degree in 1926.

He taught at University College London (UCL) from 1927 to 1938, where he recruited Hugh Gaitskell as an assistant lecturer. Hall was UCL's Professor of Political Economy from 1935 to 1938, when he was appointed Director of the newly created National Institute of Economic and Social Research (1938–43). In World War II he served in a senior position at the Ministry of Economic Warfare and then led the War Trade department at the British embassy in Washington, D.C.

Noel Hall stayed in the US after the war to make a study of interest rates at Princeton's Institute for Advanced Study and on his return to Britain was the founding Principal of the Administrative Staff College, Henley. He was knighted in 1957.

Hall returned to Brasenose as Principal from 1960 to 1973 where he was popular with students and old members, "adept in public relations" though "incorrigibly vague" in committee. He was allegedly a patron of Jeffrey Archer, and welcomed the Beatles when they visited in 1964. Hall's interest in management education continued during his tenure at Brasenose, and he was chairman of the first Academic Planning Board of Lancaster University. A member of the Oxford Regional Hospital Board, he led a working party to re-organize British hospital pharmaceutical services in response to the vast increase in new drugs becoming available at the end of the 1960s. Their "milestone" recommendations significantly expanded the role of hospital pharmacists, making them responsible for ensuring their medical and nursing colleagues use drugs safely, effectively and economically, and the Noel Hall working party was seen as a new style of expert committee whose use of statistics and research-based evidence was the catalyst for "monumental change".

Academic offices
Preceded by Maurice Platnauer	Principal of Brasenose College, Oxford; 1960–1973	Succeeded by H. L. A. Hart
