= Dale T. Mortensen =

American economist

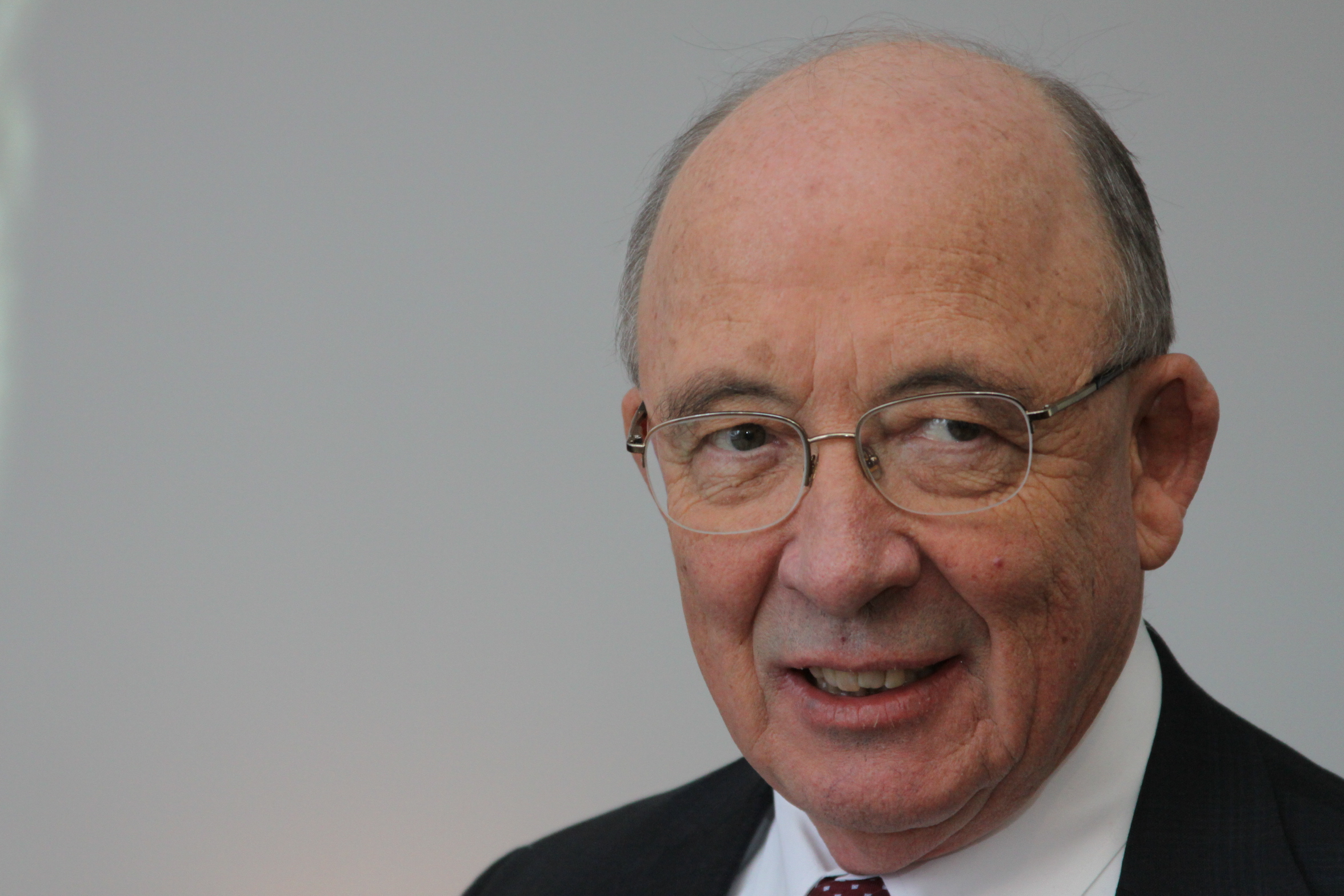
- Mortensen in 2010
- Born: February 2, 1939; Enterprise, Oregon, US
- Died: January 9, 2014 (aged 74); Wilmette, Illinois, US

Academic background
- Education: Carnegie Mellon University; Willamette University
- Thesis: The macro-dynamic implications of the 'permanent income' and 'life cycle' savings hypothesis (1967)
- Doctoral advisor: Michael C. Lovell

Academic work
- Discipline: Labor economics
- Institutions: Northwestern University
- Doctoral students: Ronald G. Ehrenberg
- Awards: IZA Prize in Labor Economics (2005); Nobel Memorial Prize in Economic Sciences; 2010
- Website: Information at IDEAS / RePEc

Dale Thomas Mortensen (February 2, 1939 – January 9, 2014) was an American economist, a professor at Northwestern University, and a winner of the Nobel Memorial Prize in Economic Sciences.

== Early life and education ==
Mortensen was born in Enterprise, Oregon. He received his BA in economics from Willamette University in 1961 and his PhD in Economics from Carnegie Mellon University in 1967.

== Career ==
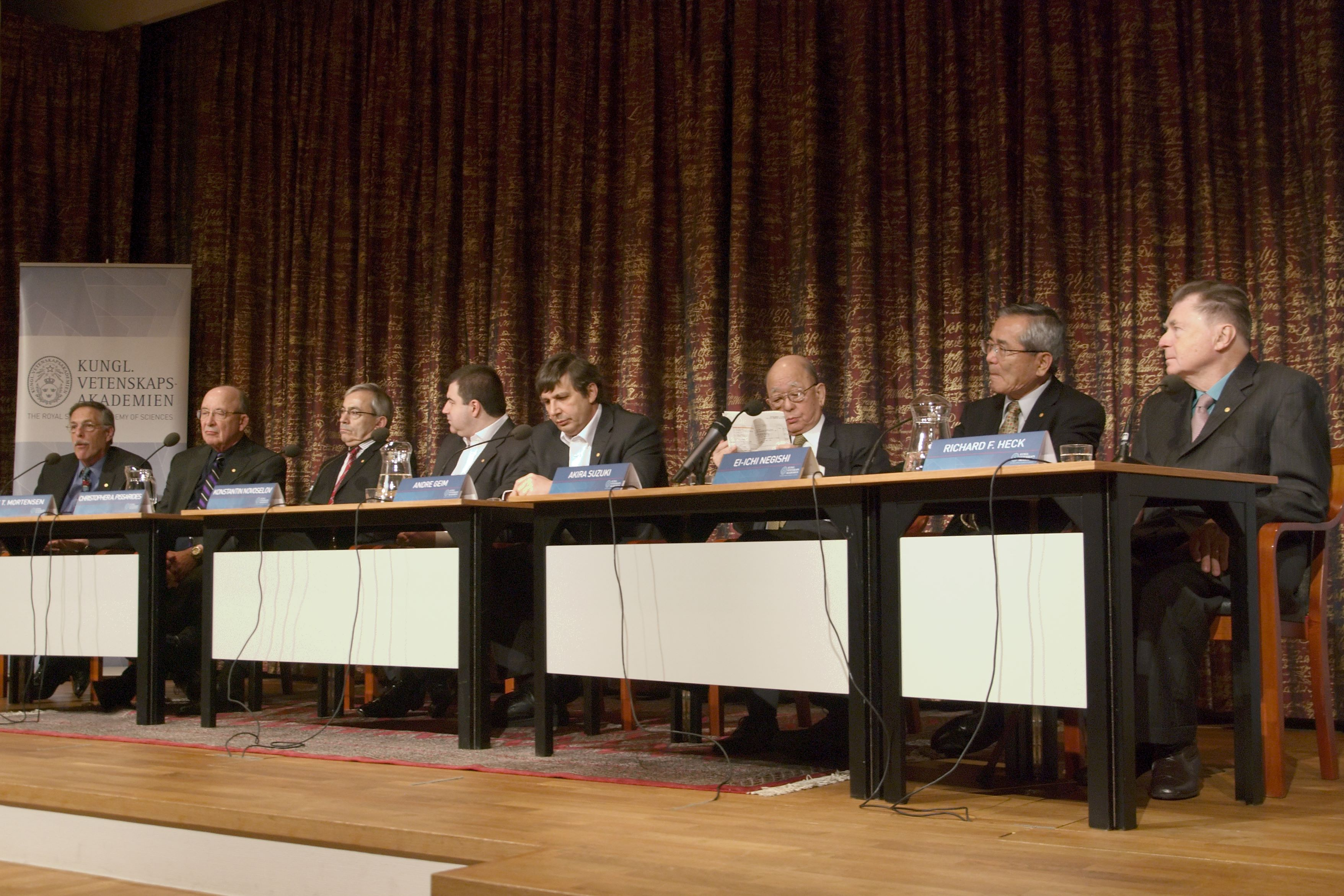
Peter Diamond, Dale T. Mortensen, Christopher A. Pissarides, Konstantin Novoselov, Andre Geim, Akira Suzuki, Ei-ichi Negishi, and Richard Heck, Nobel Prize Laureates 2010, at a press conference at the Royal Swedish Academy of Sciences in Stockholm

Mortensen had been on the faculty of Northwestern University since 1965 and a professor of Managerial Economics and Decision Sciences at the Kellogg School of Management since 1980. He was the Niels Bohr Visiting Professor at the School of Economics and Management, Aarhus University, from 2006 to 2010.

He was awarded the Nobel Memorial Prize in Economic Sciences jointly with Christopher A. Pissarides from the London School of Economics and Peter A. Diamond from the Massachusetts Institute of Technology in 2010 "for their analysis of markets with search frictions". In May 2011, Mortensen was awarded an honorary doctorate from his alma mater, Willamette University. He was married to Beverly Mortensen, also a Northwestern Professor.

Mortensen's research focused on labor economics, macroeconomics and economic theory. He is especially known for his pioneering work on the search and matching theory of frictional unemployment. He extended the insights from this work to study labor turnover and reallocation, research and development, and personal relationships.

Mortensen was a past president of the Society of Economic Dynamics and one of the founding editors of the Review of Economic Dynamics.

== Contributions to Search Theory ==
Dale T. Mortensen was awarded the Nobel Memorial Prize in Economic Sciences in 2010 along with Peter A. Diamond and Christopher A. Pissarides for their contributions to the study of markets with search frictions. Their research helped explain why unemployment can remain high even when businesses have job openings.

Mortensen's work focused on the difficulties workers and employers face when attempting to find employment matches, and these difficulties occur because finding employment requires time, information, and resources. His research demonstrated that unemployment is not always caused by a lack of available jobs but can also result from the process of connecting workers with employers.

Alongside Diamond and Pissarides, Mortensen contributed to the development of the Diamond-Mortensen-Pissarides (DMP) model. This economic framework examines how unemployment, job vacancies, and wages are influenced by labor market conditions. Economists can use this model to examine how government policies such as unemployment benefits and hiring regulations will affect the labor market.

== Death ==
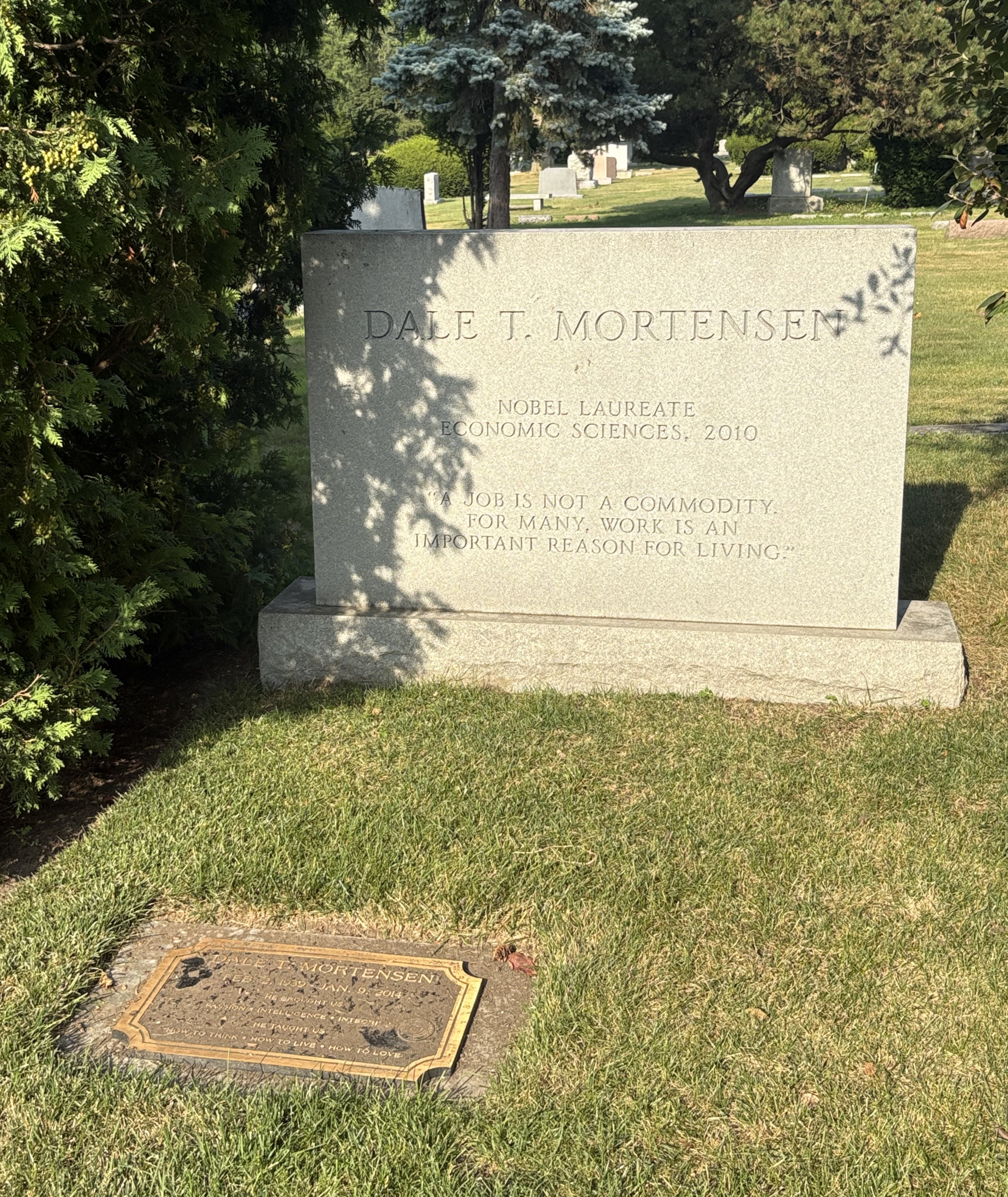
Mortensen's grave at Memorial Park Cemetery

Mortensen died of stage 4 lung cancer on January 9, 2014, at the age of 74, at his home in Wilmette. He was buried at Memorial Park Cemetery in Skokie.

In 2019 Mortensen's family donated his Nobel Prize medal to Northwestern University.

== Awards, fellowships ==
- Alexander Henderson Award, 1965
- Fellow, Econometric Society, 1979
- Fellow, American Academy of Arts and Sciences, 2000
- IZA Prize in Labor Economics, 2005
- Jacob Mincer Award, 2007
- Nobel Memorial Prize in Economics Sciences, 2010; joint with Christopher A. Pissarides and Peter A. Diamond

== The Dale T. Mortensen Building ==
The Dale T. Mortensen Building at Aarhus University was officially opened on February 1, 2011, in a ceremony attended by Crown Prince Frederik of Denmark and Mortensen himself. The Dale T. Mortensen Building is the central hub for all international and PhD activities and contains the new PhD House, Dale's Café, the university's International Centre and the new IC Dormitory for international PhD students.

== Selected publications ==
- D. Mortensen and E. Nagypál (2007), 'More on unemployment and vacancy fluctuations.' Review of Economic Dynamics 10 (3), pp. 327–347.
- D. Mortensen (2005), Wage Dispersion: Why Are Similar Workers Paid Differently?, MIT Press. ISBN 0-262-63319-1
- K. Burdett and D. Mortensen (1998), 'Wage differentials, employer size, and unemployment.' International Economic Review 39, pp. 257–273.
- D. Mortensen and C. Pissarides (1994), 'Job creation and job destruction in the theory of unemployment.' Review of Economic Studies 61, pp. 397–415.
- D. Mortensen (1986), 'Job search and labor market analysis.' Ch. 15 of Handbook of Labor Economics, vol. 2, O. Ashenfelter and R. Layard, eds., North-Holland.
- D. Mortensen (1982), 'Property rights and efficiency of mating, racing, and related games.' American Economic Review 72 (5), pp. 968–979.
- D. Mortensen (1982), 'The matching process as a non-cooperative/bargaining game.' In The Economics of Information and Uncertainty, J. McCall, ed., NBER, ISBN 0-226-55559-3.
- D. Mortensen (1972), 'A theory of wage and employment dynamics.' In Microeconomic Foundations of Employment and Inflation Theory, E. Phelps et al., eds., Norton, ISBN 978-0-393-09326-1

Awards
Preceded by Elinor Ostrom; Oliver E. Williamson	Laureate of the Nobel Memorial Prize in Economics; 2010; Served alongside: Peter A. Diamond, Christopher A. Pissarides	Succeeded by Thomas J. Sargent; Christopher A. Sims
