= Beverly Mortensen =

American academic

Beverly Patton Mortensen (born 1939) is a musician, composer, and scholar of ancient Jewish religion at Northwestern University.

== Life ==
Mortensen received her BFA in Music and Music Education from Carnegie Mellon University, in 1961. Mortensen taught music in the Pittsburgh public schools for two years, directing several choruses there. For 25 years she directed the St. Athanasius church choir in Evanston, Illinois.

Mortensen is also a prolific composer, who has written hymns, anthems, songs, masses, and oratorios. She has also directed community presentations of Broadway shows. She wrote and directed original musicals for schools and community groups in the Chicago area. She was director of the Starlight Chorale in the Wallace Bowl at Gillson Park in Wilmette, Illinois. In the early 1970s, she was a professional folk singer. Her most frequently performed compositions are entitled, "Breathe on me, Breath of God" and "Children of the Heavenly Father," both capellas.

Later, she completed a PhD program in early Judaism at Northwestern University, earning her degree in 1995. She teaches there, as an adjunct professor, classes on the Hebrew Bible and Contemporary Religion. She also edits the twice yearly bibliography Newsletter for Targumic and Cognate Studies.

She was married to Dale T. Mortensen (1939-2014), an economist and professor at Northwestern who won the Nobel Prize in 2010.

== Selected Bibliography ==
- The Priesthood in Targum Pseudo-Jonathan: Renewing the Profession (Studies in Aramaic Interpretation of Scripture 4). Brill, Leiden (2006). ISBN 978-9004145-82-5
- "Pseudo-Jonathan's Temple, Symbol of Judaism," Targum and Scripture. Brill, Leiden (2002), 129–137. <https://doi.org/10.1163/9789004494114_015>
- "Pseudo-Jonathan and Economics for Priests," Journal for the Study of the Pseudepigrapha 10:20 (Oct, 1999): 39-71. ISSN 0951-8207 <https://doi.org/10.1177/095182079900002002>
- "Review of Covenant of Blood: Circumcision and Gender in Rabbinic Judaism by Lawrence A. Hoffman." Hebrew Studies. A Journal Devoted to Hebrew Language and Literature 39 (1998): 259-261. ISSN 0146-4094 <https://www.jstor.org/stable/27909648>
- Examining Your Childhood Religion
