= IZA Prize in Labor Economics =

German prize

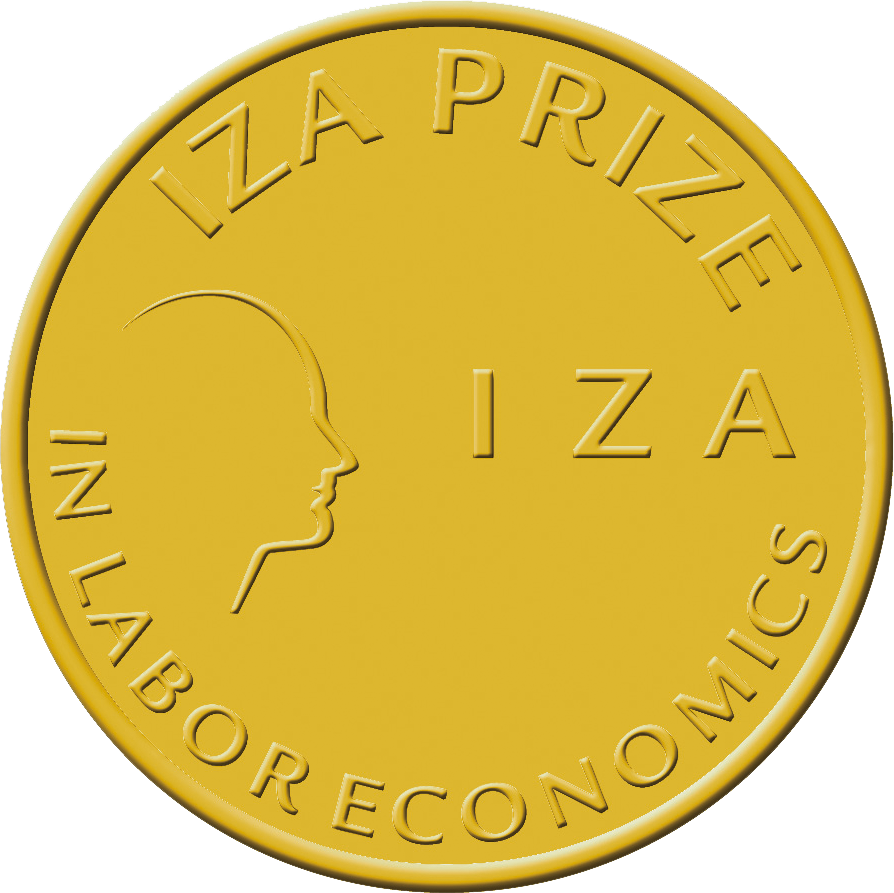
- IZA Prize Medal
- Awarded for: Labor economics
- Presented by: Institute for the Study of Labor
- Status: Defunct
- First award: 2002
- Final award: 2020

Highlights
- Total: 17
- Total recipients: 21
- Website: Awards page

The IZA Prize in Labor Economics (2002–2020) was a prestigious award in the field of labor economics. The Institute for the Study of Labor awarded a prize each year (from 2016 on every two years in turn with the IZA Young Labor Economist Award) for outstanding academic achievement in the field of labor economics.

The IZA Prize in Labor Economics was the only international science prize awarded exclusively to labor economists was considered the most important award in labor economics worldwide. The prize was awarded through a nomination process and decided upon by the IZA Prize Committee, which consisted of internationally renowned labor economists.

As a part of the prize, IZA Prize Laureates contributed a volume as an overview of their most significant findings to the IZA Prize in Labor Economics Series published by Oxford University Press.

== Funding and prize components ==
The IZA Prize in Labor Economics consisted of a prize medal and a cash award of 50,000 euros. This provides the monetary support for the recipients' past and future research and is meant to stimulate further labor market research.

== Nomination and selection process ==
IZA has a worldwide network of over 1,300 labor economists who collaborate as research fellows with the institute. Each year they nominate candidates for the IZA Prize in Labor Economics from the research and work of their peers and colleagues. The nominations are reviewed by the IZA Prize Committee, which consists of IZA representatives, Research Fellows and prominent international labor economists.

== IZA Prize Committee ==
Five Nobel laureates in Economics have served as members of the Prize Committee, George Akerlof, Gary Becker, James Heckman, Joseph Stiglitz and David Card. The committee was coordinated by Daniel S. Hamermesh. Final members, besides Hamermesh were: Francine D. Blau (Cornell University), Richard Blundell (University College London), George Borjas (Harvard University), David Card (University of California, Berkeley), and Shelly Lundberg (University of California, Santa Barbara).

== IZA Prize in Labor Economics Series ==
As a part of the IZA Prize in Labor Economics from 2007 to 2019 each Laureate produced a volume for the IZA Prize in Labor Economics Book Series consisting of their most significant findings. The Series covers a broad range of important issues in labor economics. The series is published by Oxford University Press.

== IZA Prize Laureates ==
The winners of the IZA Prize include a number of influential labor economists who are active in policy advice. For example, Edward Lazear was Chairman of the Council of Economic Advisers under President George W. Bush. Alan Krueger was nominated for the same post by President Barack Obama.

Year	Laureate(s)	Affiliation	Book title
2002	Jacob Mincer	Columbia University	The Founding Father of Modern Labor Economics
2003	Orley Ashenfelter	Princeton University	Labor Policy Evaluation and the Design of Natural Experiments (forthcoming)
2004	Edward Lazear	Stanford University	Inside the Firm: Contributions to Personnel Economics
2005	Dale T. Mortensen; Christopher A. Pissarides	Northwestern University; London School of Economics	Job Matching, Wage Dispersion, and Unemployment
2006	David Card; Alan B. Krueger	University of California, Berkeley; Princeton University	Wages, School Quality, and Employment Demand
2007	Richard B. Freeman	Harvard University and London School of Economics	Making Europe Work (forthcoming)
2008	Richard Layard; Stephen Nickell	London School of Economics; Nuffield College	Combatting Unemployment
2009	Richard Easterlin	University of Southern California	Happiness, Growth, and the Life Cycle
2010	Francine Blau	Cornell University	Gender, Inequality and Wages
2011	George J. Borjas; Barry Chiswick	Harvard University; George Washington University	Foundations of Migration Economics
2012	Richard Blundell	University College London	Labor Supply and Taxation
2013	Daniel S. Hamermesh	University of Texas at Austin and Royal Holloway	The Demand for Labor: The Neglected Side of the Market
2014	Gary S. Fields	Cornell University	Employment and Development
2015	Jan Švejnar	Columbia University	Workers, Firms, and Transition (forthcoming)
2016	Claudia Goldin	Harvard University	An Evolving Force - the History of Women in the Economy (forthcoming)
2018	Joseph Altonji	Yale University	
2020	Lawrence F. Katz	Harvard University	

== See also ==
- List of economics awards
