= Brian Corby =

Sir Brian Corby

Chancellor of University of Hertfordshire
- In office 1992–1996
- Succeeded by: Ian MacLaurin

Personal details
- Born: Frederick Brian Corby; 10 May 1929 Northamptonshire, England
- Died: 23 April 2009 (aged 79)
- Education: University of Cambridge
- Occupation: Academic
- Website: http://www.herts.ac.uk

Sir Frederick Brian Corby (10 May 1929 – 23 April 2009) was a British businessman who held a variety of positions on the boards of important industrial, artistic and education organisations. He was the first chancellor of the University of Hertfordshire. He was the chairman of the Prudential Corporation and the first representative of the insurance industry to serve as president of the Confederation of British Industry.

== Early years and education ==
Frederick Brian Corby was born in 1929 near Northampton, where his father worked in the city's traditional shoe trade. Corby was educated at Kimbolton School and went up to St John's College, Cambridge to read Mathematics after national service in the Royal Air Force. On graduation in 1952 he joined the actuary's office of the Prudential, spending most of his career – apart from a secondment to South Africa from 1958 to 1962 – in its head office at Holborn. He became a general manager in 1976 and chief actuary in 1980.

== Career ==
In 1990, he was elected president of the Confederation of British Industry (CBI), where his two-year tenure coincided with a period of recession and very high borrowing costs which caused great pain for the CBI's membership. Corby urged John Major's government to slash interest rates to speed recovery, but the response from 10 Downing Street was that his members would have to "be patient".

Corby was a member of the Court of the Bank of England from 1985 to 1993, chairman of the Association of British Insurers, president of the National Institute of Economic and Social Research and vice-president of the Institute of Actuaries.

He was chairman from 1990 to 1998 of the Southbank Centre, which he defended robustly against accusations that it was "technically insolvent" and could be saved only by privatisation.

An enthusiast for European cooperation, he contributed to work in Brussels on the development of the European Union internal market, and chaired a number of study groups on European business issues for the Federal Trust.

== Personal life ==
Brian Corby was knighted in 1989. In retirement he enjoyed golf, gardening and reading history. He married, in 1952, Elizabeth (Beth) McInnes, with whom he had a son and two daughters.
