= Centre for Macroeconomics =

Research centre of the London, England

- CFM Logo
- Other name: CFM
- Established: 2012
- Affiliations: University of Cambridge, London School of Economics, University of Oxford, University College London, Bank of England, National Institute of Economic and Social Research
- Chairman: Christopher A. Pissarides
- Director: Ricardo Reis
- Academic staff: 67
- Students: 55
- Location: London, United Kingdom
- Website: centreformacroeconomics.ac.uk

The Centre For Macroeconomics (CFM) is a research centre in London dedicated to the investigation and development of new methodologies and research in order to inform economic policy decisions. It also focuses on ways to alleviate the effects of the 2008 financial crisis through its careful study. The CFM is funded by the Economic and Social Research Council (ESRC), and was founded in 2012. It is one of the larger research centers in the world dedicated to the study of financial crises.

== Research Programmes ==
Chaired by LSE’s Christopher Pissarides, the Centre comprises economists from University of Cambridge, London School of Economics (LSE), University of Oxford, University College London (UCL), the Bank of England and the National Institute of Economic and Social Research (NIESR). The Centre is co-directed by Ricardo Reis, Professor of Economics at LSE.

The Centre's main research activities are divided into five different areas:

1. Developing new methodologies
2. Consequences of fiscal austerity plans and high debt levels
3. Interaction between financial markets, monetary policy, and the macro economy
4. Shifts in the world economy
5. Labour markets, unemployment levels and long term prospects

Research is disseminated through events, workshops, seminars and published materials – in particular, through a discussion paper series on RePEc, and a public lecture programme at LSE.

== CFM Survey ==
Launched in 2014, the monthly CFM Survey questions a panel of UK-based economists on macroeconomic and public policy in both the UK and international economies, and highlights the degree of consensus among these experts. The survey aims to give a comprehensive overview of the beliefs held by economists, in particular "to include the views of those economists whose opinions are not frequently heard in public debates".
