= Gary S. Fields =

American economist

Gary Sheldon Fields (born October 1, 1946) is an American economist, the John P. Windmuller Professor of International and Comparative Labor and Professor of Economics at Cornell University. Fields has performed extensive research in labor economics and development economics, in particular labor mobility, which was rewarded with the IZA Prize in Labor Economics in 2014.

== Education ==
Fields obtained his B.A. (1967), M.A. (1969) and Ph.D. (1972) from the University of Michigan in economics.

== Academic career ==
Fields joined Yale University as an assistant professor of economics in 1972, being promoted to associate professor in 1976 and directing the Economic Growth Center from 1977 to 1978. In 1978 he moved to Cornell University as associate professor of industrial and labor relations, becoming full professor in 1982 and being endowed with the John P. Windmuller Chair of International and Comparative Labor in 2008. At Cornell University he has been director of the ILR International Initiative (1991–94) and of the Program on Globalization and the Workplace (2007–10) as well as chairman of Department of Labor Economics and the Department of International and Comparative Labor. He has also worked as an advisor for the World Bank, International Labour Organization, Asian Development Bank, Inter-American Development Bank, Global Development Network, and the United Nations, private companies like Deloitte and governments.

== Research ==
Fields' fields of academic interest include labor economics, development economics, and the economics of the workplace and management, although his current research concentrates on economic mobility, labor market models, and labor markets in developing economies. The bibliographic database IDEAS/RePEc lists him among the top 5% authors in economics according to a number of metrics, e.g. average rank score and number of citations. His most-cited research article, published in 1975, analyzes the unemployment and underemployment in least developed countries in a quantity adjustment framework by making extensions to the Harris-Todaro model of rural-urban migration, namely (1) allowances for more generalized job search behavior, an urban traditional sector, preferential hiring by educational level, and labor turnover considerations. A predicted unemployment rate much lower than in the initial model and more in line with empirical observations is the result of these modifications, explaining the appeal of Fields' labor market model in development economics.

In another highly cited article, co-authored with Efe A. Ok and published in 1996, Fields defines the concept of income mobility and develops a measure of income mobility which is additively decomposable into its two sources, namely the transfer of income among individuals within a given structure and the change in total income, e.g. due to economic growth or contraction. His most recent work centers on the working poor, defined as individuals working (often as self-employed) but earning less than $2 (PPP) per day, and their attempts to enter wage-paying employment or improve their earnings within self-employment.
