= Elinor Ostrom =

American political economist (1933–2012)

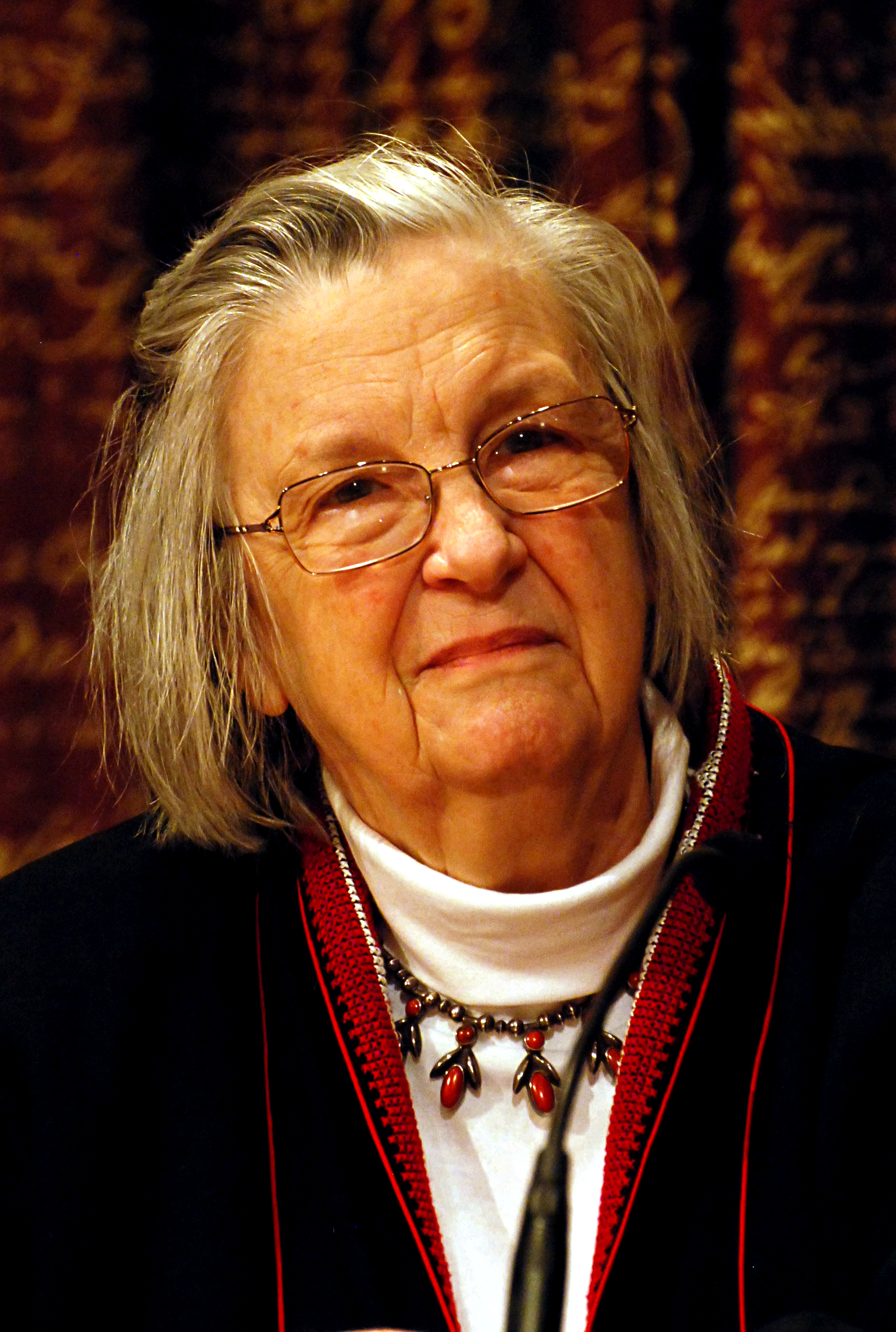
- Ostrom in 2009
- Born: Elinor Claire Awan; August 7, 1933; Los Angeles, California, U.S.
- Died: June 12, 2012 (aged 78); Bloomington, Indiana, U.S.
- Spouses: Charles Scott; Vincent Ostrom (1963–2012; her death)

Academic background
- Education: University of California, Los Angeles (BA, MA, PhD)
- Doctoral advisor: Dwaine Marvick

Academic work
- Discipline: Public economics; Common-pool resource; Public choice theory
- School or tradition: New institutional economics Bloomington school
- Institutions: Indiana University Bloomington; Arizona State University; Virginia Tech; UCLA
- Notable ideas: Institutional Analysis and Development framework; Governing the Commons
- Awards: 2009 Nobel Memorial Prize; 2004 John J. Carty Award; 2001 US National Academy of Sciences electee; 1999 Johan Skytte Prize in Political Science
- Website: Information at IDEAS / RePEc

Elinor Claire "Lin" Ostrom (née Awan; August 7, 1933 – June 12, 2012) was an American political scientist and political economist whose work was associated with New Institutional Economics and the resurgence of political economy. In 2009, she was awarded the Nobel Memorial Prize in Economic Sciences for her "analysis of economic governance, especially the commons", which she shared with Oliver E. Williamson; she was the first woman to win the prize.

Trained in political science at UCLA, Ostrom was a faculty member at Indiana University Bloomington for 47 years. In the 1960s, she was involved in resource management policy and created a research center, the Workshop in Political Theory and Policy Analysis, designed around workshop principles (rather than those of a traditional university, which typically relies on lectures and a strict hierarchy). It attracted scientists from different disciplines from around the world. Late in her career, she became affiliated with Arizona State University.

Ostrom studied the interaction of people and ecosystems for many years and showed that the use of exhaustible resources by groups of people (communities, cooperatives, trusts, trade unions) can be rational and prevent depletion of the resource without either state intervention or markets with private property.

== Early life and education ==
Elinor Claire Awan was born in Los Angeles, California, as the only child of Leah Hopkins, a musician, and Adrian Awan, a set designer. Her parents separated early in her life, and Elinor lived with her mother most of the time. She attended a Protestant church with her mother and often spent weekends with her father's Jewish family. Growing up in the post-Depression era to divorced artisans, Ostrom described herself as a "poor kid." Her major recreational activity was swimming, where she eventually joined a swimming team and swam competitively until she started teaching swimming to earn funds to help put herself through college.

Ostrom grew up across the street from Beverly Hills High School, which she attended, graduating in 1951. She regarded this as fortunate, for the school had a very high rate of college admission. During Ostrom's junior year, she was encouraged to join the debate team. Learning debate tactics had an important impact on her ways of thinking. It allowed her to realize there are two sides to public policy and it is imperative to have quality arguments for both sides. As a high school student, Elinor Ostrom had been discouraged from studying trigonometry, as girls without top marks in algebra and geometry were not allowed to take the subject. No one in her immediate family had any college experience, but seeing that 90% of students in her high school attended college, she saw it as the "normal" thing to do. Her mother did not wish for her to attend college, seeing no reason for it.

She attended UCLA, receiving a B.A. with honors in political science at UCLA in 1954. By attending multiple summer sessions and extra classes throughout semesters, she was able to graduate in three years. She worked at the library, dime store and bookstore in order to pay her fees which were $50 per semester. After graduation, she had trouble finding a job because employers presumed that she was only looking for jobs as a teacher or secretary. She began a job as an export clerk after taking a correspondence course for shorthand, which she later found to be helpful when taking notes in face-to-face interviews on research projects. After a year, she obtained a position as assistant personnel manager in a business firm that had never before hired a woman in anything but a secretarial position. This job inspired her to think about attending graduate-level courses and eventually applying for a research assistantship and admission to a Ph.D. program.

Lacking any math from her undergraduate education and trigonometry from high school, she was consequently rejected for an economics Ph.D. program at UCLA. She was admitted to UCLA's graduate program in political science, where she was awarded an M.A. in 1962 and a Ph.D. in 1965. The teams of graduate students she was involved with were analyzing the political economic effects of a group of groundwater basins in Southern California. Specifically, Ostrom was assigned to look at the West Basin. She found it is very difficult to manage a common-pool resource when it is used between individuals. The locals were pumping too much groundwater and salt water seeped into the basin. Ostrom was impressed with how people from conflicting and overlapping jurisdictions who depended on that source found incentives to settle contradictions and solve the problem. She made the study of this collaboration the topic of her dissertation, laying the foundation for the study of "shared resources".

== Career ==
Ostrom was informed by fieldwork, both her own and that of others. During her PhD at the University of California, Los Angeles, she spent years studying the water wars and pumping races going on in the 1950s in her own dry backyard. In contrast to the prevailing rational-economic predictions of Malthusianism and the tragedy of the commons, she showed cases where humans were not trapped and helpless amid diminishing supplies. In her book Governing the Commons, she draws on studies of irrigation systems in Spain and the Philippines, mountain villages in Switzerland and Japan, and fisheries in Nova Scotia and Indonesia.

In 1961, Vincent Ostrom, Charles Tiebout, and Robert Warren published "The Organization of Government in Metropolitan Areas," which would go on to be an influential article and introduced themes that would be central to the Ostroms' work. However, the article aggravated a conflict with UCLA's Bureau of Governmental Research because, counter to the Bureau's interests, it advised against centralization of metropolitan areas in favor of polycentrism. This conflict prompted the Ostroms to leave UCLA. They moved to Bloomington, Indiana, in 1965, when Vincent accepted a political science professorship at Indiana University. She joined the faculty as a visiting assistant professor. The first course she taught was an evening class on American government.

Ostrom's research challenged Garrett Hardin's claim that shared resources inevitably suffer overuse. Drawing on field studies, she showed that communities can create durable rules to govern common-pool resources without relying solely on privatization or centralized state control. Garrett Hardin believes that the most important aspect that we need to realize today is the need to abandon the principle of shared resources in reproduction. A possible alternative to the tragedy of the commons (shared needs) was described in Elinor Ostrom's book Governing the Commons. Based on her fieldwork, the book demonstrates that there are practical algorithms for the collective use of a limited common resource, which solve the many issues with both government/regulation driven solutions and market-based ones.

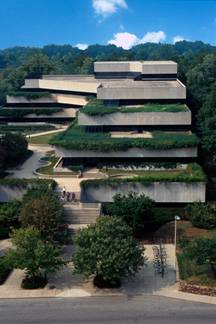
School of Public and Environmental Affairs at Indiana University Bloomington, where Ostrom taught.

In 1973, Ostrom and her husband founded the Workshop in Political Theory and Policy Analysis at Indiana University. Examining the use of collective action, trust, and cooperation in the management of common pool resources (CPR), her institutional approach to public policy, known as the Institutional analysis and development framework (IAD), has been considered sufficiently distinct to be thought of as a separate school of public choice theory. She authored many books in the fields of organizational theory, political science, and public administration. Elinor Ostrom was a dedicated scholar until the very end of her life. Indeed, on the day before she died, she sent e-mail messages to at least two different sets of coauthors about papers that she was writing with them. She was the chief scientific advisor for the International Council for Science (ICSU) Planet Under Pressure meeting in London in March, and Johan Rockström of the Stockholm Resilience Centre wrote that

"Lin, up until the very end, was heavily involved in our preparations for the Nobel laureate dialogues on global sustainability we will be hosting in Rio 17th and 18th of June during the UN Rio+20 Earth Summit. In the end, she decided she could not come in person, but was contributing sharp, enthusiastically charged, inputs, in the way only she could."

It was long unanimously held among economists that natural resources that were collectively used by their users would be over-exploited and destroyed in the long-term. Elinor Ostrom disproved this idea by conducting field studies on how people in small, local communities manage shared natural resources, such as pastures, fishing waters and forests. She showed that when natural resources are jointly used by their users, in time, rules are established for how these are to be cared for and they become used in a way that is both economically and ecologically sustainable.

Ostrom was appointed Professor of Political Science in 1974. She was the head of the department from 1980 to 1984, and then held the Arthur F. Bentley Chair of Political Science She was appointed Distinguished Professor in 2010 and held a partial appointment in the School of Public and Environmental Affairs.

She was senior research director of the Vincent and Elinor Ostrom Workshop in Political Theory and Policy Analysis, Distinguished Professor and Arthur F. Bentley Professor of Political Science in the College of Arts and Sciences, and professor in the School of Public and Environmental Affairs. The Workshop in Political Theory and Policy Analysis was meant to utilize diverse scholars throughout economics, political science, and other fields to collaborate and attempt to understand how institutional arrangements in a diverse set of ecological and social economic political settings affected behavior and outcomes. The goal was not to fly around the world collecting data, rather it is to create a network of scholars who live in particular areas of the world and had strong interests in forest conditions and forest policy conducted the studies.

Ostrom's innovative and ground-breaking research was supported by National Science Foundation, the Andrew Mellon Foundation, the Hynde and Harry Bradley Foundation, the MacArthur Foundation, the Ford Foundation, the Food and Agriculture Organization of the United Nations, U.S.A.I.D., the U.S. Geological Survey, the U.S. Department of Justice, and the National Institute of Mental Health.

Ostrom has been involved in international activities throughout her long and productive career. She had experience in Kenya, Nepal and Nigeria, and also made research trips to Australia, Bolivia, India, Indonesia, Mexico, Philippines, Poland and Zimbabwe. During workshops and research grants, she and her husband supported many international students, and visited researchers and policymakers. They did not have children of their own and used personal funds and efforts to receive grants to help others. In a 2010 interview, Ostrom noted that because they had no family to support, "I was not ever concerned about salary, so that's never been an issue for me. For some colleagues who have big families, and all the rest, it's a major issue."

Ostrom was a founding member and first president of the IASC (International Association for the Study of the Commons). She was a lead researcher for the Sustainable Agriculture and Natural Resource Management Collaborative Research Support Program (SANREM CRSP), managed by Virginia Tech and funded by USAID. Beginning in 2008, she and her husband Vincent Ostrom advised the journal Transnational Corporations Review.

== Research ==
Ostrom's early work emphasized the role of public choice on decisions influencing the production of public goods and services. Among her better known works in this area is her study on the polycentricity of police functions in Indianapolis. Caring for the commons had to be a multiple task, organised from the ground up and shaped to cultural norms. It had to be discussed face to face, and based on trust. Dr. Ostrom, besides poring over satellite data and quizzing lobstermen herself, enjoyed employing game theory to try to predict the behaviour of people faced with limited resources. In her Workshop in Political Theory and Policy Analysis at Indiana University—set up with her husband Vincent, a political scientist, in 1973—her students were given shares in a national common. When they discussed what they should do before they did it, their rate of return from their "investments" more than doubled. Her later, and more famous, work focused on how humans interact with ecosystems to maintain long-term sustainable resource yields. Common pool resources include many forests, fisheries, oil fields, grazing lands, and irrigation systems. She conducted her field studies on the management of pasture by locals in Africa and irrigation systems management in villages of western Nepal (e.g., Dang Deukhuri). Her work has considered how societies have developed diverse institutional arrangements for managing natural resources and avoiding ecosystem collapse in many cases, even though some arrangements have failed to prevent resource exhaustion. Her work emphasized the multifaceted nature of human–ecosystem interaction and argues against any singular "panacea" for individual social-ecological system problems.

=== "Design principles illustrated by long-enduring CPR (Common Pool Resource) institutions" ===
In Governing the Commons, Ostrom summarized eight design principles that were present in the sustainable common pool resource institutions she studied:

1. Clearly defined boundaries: Individuals or households who have rights to withdraw resource units from the CPR must be clearly defined, as must the boundaries of the CPR itself.
2. Congruence between appropriation and provision rules and local conditions: Appropriation rules restricting time, place, technology, and/or quantity of resource units are related to local labor, material, and/or money.
3. Collective-choice arrangements: Most individuals affected by the operational rules can participate in modifying the operational rules.
4. Monitoring: Monitors, who actively audit CPR conditions and appropriator behavior, are accountable to the appropriators or are the appropriators.
5. Graduated sanctions: Appropriators who violate operational rules are likely to be assessed graduated sanctions (depending on the seriousness and context of the offense) by other appropriators, by officials accountable to these appropriators, or by both.
6. Conflict-resolution mechanisms: Appropriators and their officials have rapid access to low-cost local arenas to resolve conflicts among appropriators or between appropriators and officials.
7. Minimal recognition of rights to organize: The rights of appropriators to devise their own institutions are not challenged by external governmental authorities.

For CPRs that are parts of larger systems:

8. Nested enterprises: Appropriation, provision, monitoring, enforcement, conflict resolution, and governance activities are organized in multiple layers of nested enterprises.

These principles have since been slightly modified and expanded to include a number of additional variables believed to affect the success of self-organized governance systems, including effective communication, internal trust and reciprocity, and the nature of the resource system as a whole.

Ostrom and her many co-researchers have developed a comprehensive "Social-Ecological Systems (SES) framework", within which much of the still-evolving theory of common-pool resources and collective self-governance is now located.

=== Environmental protection ===
According to the Norwegian Institute for Urban and Regional Research, "Ostrom cautioned against single governmental units at global level to solve the collective action problem of coordinating work against environmental destruction. Partly, this is due to their complexity, and partly to the diversity of actors involved. Her proposal was that of a polycentric approach, where key management decisions should be made as close to the scene of events and the actors involved as possible." Ostrom helped disprove the idea held by economists that natural resources would be over-used and destroyed in the long run. Elinor Ostrom disproved this idea by conducting field studies on how people in small, local communities manage shared natural resources, such as pastures, fishing waters in Maine and Indonesia, and forests in Nepal. She showed that when natural resources are jointly managed by their users, in time, rules are established for how these are to be cared for and used in a way that is both economically and ecologically sustainable.

=== Ostrom's law ===
Ostrom's law is an adage that represents how Elinor Ostrom's works in economics challenge previous theoretical frameworks and assumptions about property, especially the commons. Ostrom's detailed analyses of functional examples of the commons create an alternative view of the arrangement of resources that are both practically and theoretically possible. This eponymous law is stated succinctly by Lee Anne Fennell as:

A resource arrangement that works in practice can work in theory.

== Personal life ==
After college, Ostrom married a classmate, Charles Scott, and worked at General Radio in Cambridge, Massachusetts, while Scott attended Harvard Law School. They divorced several years later when Ostrom began contemplating a Ph.D.

Her postgraduate seminar was led by Vincent Ostrom, an associate professor of political science, 14 years her senior, whom she married in 1963. This marked the beginning of a lifelong partnership of "love and contestation," as Ostrom put it in her dedication to her seminal 1990 book, Governing the Commons: The Evolution of Institutions for Collective Action.

== Awards and recognition ==
Ostrom was a member of the United States National Academy of Sciences, a member of the American Philosophical Society, and president of the American Political Science Association and the Public Choice Society. In 1999, she became the first woman to receive the prestigious Johan Skytte Prize in Political Science.

Ostrom's book "Governing the Commons: The Evolution of Institutions for Collective Action" was awarded the Harold & Margaret Sprout Award in 1992. Ostrom was awarded the Frank E. Seidman Distinguished Award for Political Economy in 1998. Her presented paper, on "The Comparative Study of Public Economies", was followed by a discussion among Kenneth Arrow, Thomas Schelling, and Amartya Sen. She was awarded the John J. Carty Award from the National Academy of Sciences in 2004, and, in 2005, received the James Madison Award by the American Political Science Association. In 2008, she became the first woman to receive the William H. Riker Prize in political science; and, the following year, she received the Tisch Civic Engagement Research Prize from the Jonathan M. Tisch College of Citizenship and Public Service at Tufts University. In 2010, the Utne Reader magazine included Ostrom as one of the "25 Visionaries Who Are Changing Your World". She was named one of Time magazine's "100 Most Influential People in the World" in 2012.

The International Institute of Social Studies (ISS) awarded its Honorary Fellowship to her in 2002.

Telephone interview with Elinor Ostrom

In 2008 she was awarded an honorary degree, doctor honoris causa, at the Norwegian University of Science and Technology.

In July 2019, Indiana University Bloomington announced that as part of their Bridging the Visibility Gap initiative, a statue of Ostrom would be placed outside of the building which houses the university's political science department.

=== Nobel Prize in Economics ===
In 2009, Ostrom became the first woman to receive the Nobel Memorial Prize in Economic Sciences. The Royal Swedish Academy of Sciences cited Ostrom "for her analysis of economic governance", saying her work had demonstrated how common property could be successfully managed by groups using it. Ostrom and Oliver E. Williamson shared the 10-million Swedish kronor (€990,000; $1.44 million) prize for their separate work in economic governance. As she had done with previous monetary prizes, Ostrom donated her award to the Workshop she helped to found.

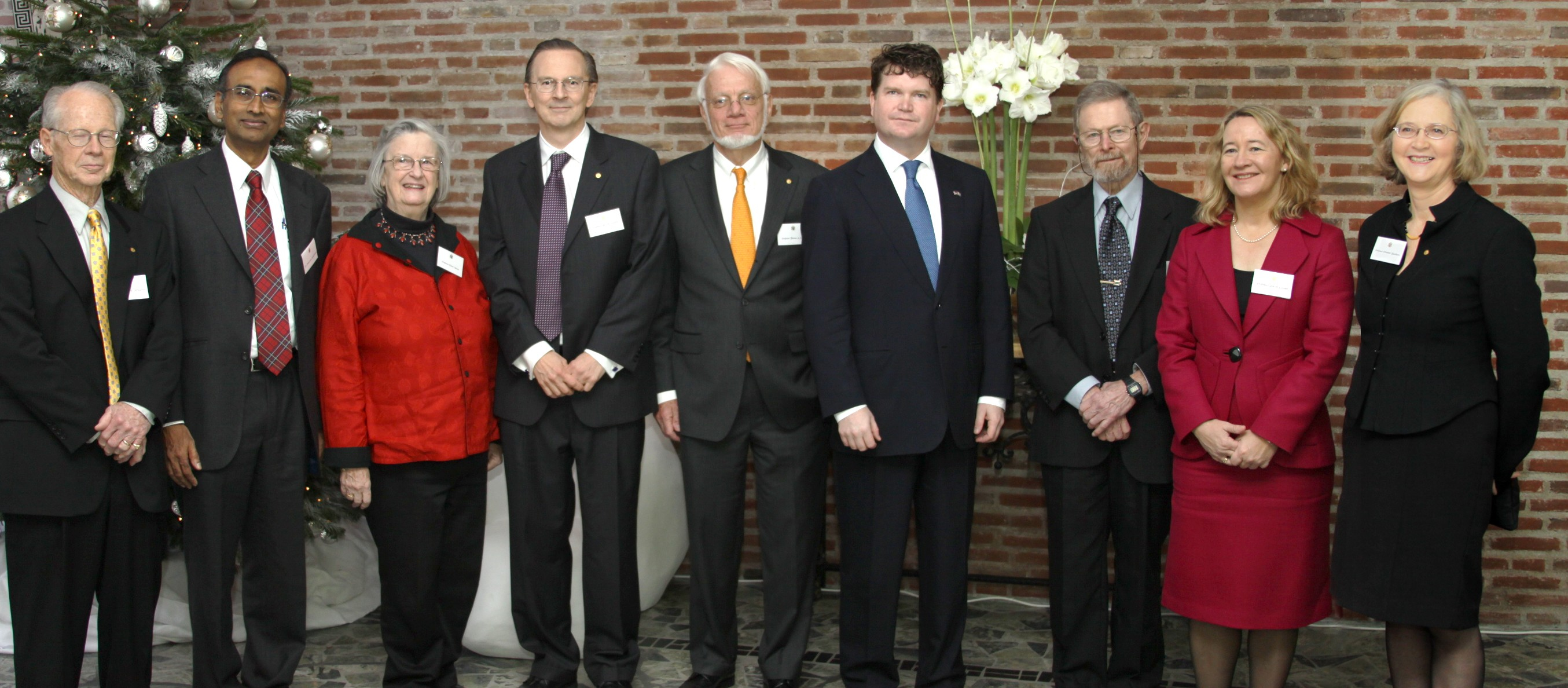
Elinor Ostrom with the other 2009 Nobel laureates

The Royal Swedish Academy of Sciences said Ostrom's "research brought this topic from the fringe to the forefront of scientific attention...by showing how common resources—forests, fisheries, oil fields or grazing lands—can be managed successfully by the people who use them rather than by governments or private companies". Ostrom's work in this regard challenged conventional wisdom, showing that common resources can be successfully managed without government regulation or privatization.

In awarding Ostrom the Nobel Prize for the Analysis of Economic Governance, the Royal Swedish Academy of Sciences noted that her work "teaches us novel lessons about the deep mechanisms that sustain cooperation in human societies." Even if Ostrom's selection (along with co-recipient Oliver Williamson of the University of California, Berkeley) seemed odd to some, others saw it as an appropriate reaction to free-market inefficiencies highlighted by the 2008 financial crisis.

== Death ==
Ostrom was diagnosed with pancreatic cancer in October 2011. During the final year of her life, she continued to write and lecture, giving the Hayek Lecture at the Institute of Economic Affairs just eleven weeks before her death. She died at 6:40 a.m. Tuesday, June 12, 2012, at IU Health Bloomington Hospital at the age of 78. On the day of her death, she published her last article, "Green from the Grassroots," in Project Syndicate. Indiana University president Michael McRobbie wrote: "Indiana University has lost an irreplaceable and magnificent treasure with the passing of Elinor Ostrom". Her Indiana colleague Michael McGinnis commented after her death that Ostrom donated her share of the $1.4 million Nobel award money to the Workshop—the biggest, by far, of several academic prizes with monetary awards that the Ostroms had given to the center over the years. Her husband Vincent died 17 days later from complications related to cancer. He was 92.

== Selected publications ==
=== Books ===
- Ostrom, Elinor (1990). Governing the Commons: The Evolution of Institutions for Collective Action. Cambridge, UK: Cambridge University Press. ISBN 978-0-521-40599-7 – via Internet Archive.
- Ostrom, Elinor; Schroeder, Larry; Wynne, Susan (1993). Institutional incentives and sustainable development: infrastructure policies in perspective. Boulder: Westview Press. ISBN 978-0-8133-1619-2.
- Ostrom, Elinor; Walker, James; Gardner, Roy (1994). Rules, games, and common-pool resources. Ann Arbor: University of Michigan Press. ISBN 978-0-472-06546-2.
- Ostrom, Elinor; Walker, James (2003). Trust and reciprocity: interdisciplinary lessons from experimental research. New York: Russell Sage Foundation. ISBN 978-0-87154-647-0.
- Gibson, Clark C.; Andersson, Krister; Ostrom, Elinor; Shivakumar, Sujai (2005). The Samaritan's Dilemma: The Political Economy of Development Aid. Oxford Scholarship Online. ISBN 978-0-19-927885-5.
- Ostrom, Elinor (2005). Understanding institutional diversity. Princeton: Princeton University Press. ISBN 978-0-691-12238-0.
- Ostrom, Elinor; Kanbur, Ravi; Guha-Khasnobis, Basudeb (2007). Linking the formal and informal economy: concepts and policies. Oxford: Oxford University Press. ISBN 978-0-19-923729-6.
- Ostrom, Elinor; Hess, Charlotte (2007). Understanding knowledge as a commons: from theory to practice. Cambridge, Massachusetts: MIT Press. ISBN 978-0-262-51603-7.
- Ostrom, Elinor; Poteete, Amy R; Janssen, Marco A (2010). Working Together: Collective Action, the Commons, and Multiple Methods in Practice. Princeton: Princeton University Press. ISBN 978-0-691-14604-1.
- Ostrom, Elinor; Lam, Wai Fung; Pradhan, Prachanda; Shivakoti, Ganesh (2011). Improving Irrigation in Asia Sustainable Performance of an Innovative Intervention in Nepal. Cheltenham, UK: Edward Elgar. ISBN 978-0-85793-826-8.
- Cole, Daniel H.; Ostrom, Elinor (2011). Property in Land and Other Resources. Cambridge, MA: Lincoln Institute of Land Policy. ISBN 978-1-55844-228-3.
- Ostrom, Elinor; Chang, Christina; Pennington, Mark; Tarko, Vlad (2012). The Future of the Commons Beyond Market Failure and Government Regulation. London: The Institute of Economic Affairs. ISBN 978-0-255-36653-3.

=== Chapters in books ===
- Ostrom, Elinor (2009), "Engaging with impossibilities and possibilities", in Kanbur, Ravi; Basu, Kaushik (eds.), Arguments for a better world: essays in honor of Amartya Sen | Volume II: Society, institutions and development, Oxford New York: Oxford University Press, pp. 522–541, ISBN 978-0-19-923997-9.

=== Journal articles ===
- Ostrom, Elinor; Crawford, Sue E. S. (September 1995). "A grammar of institutions". American Political Science Review. 89 (3): 582–600. doi:10.2307/2082975. JSTOR 2082975. S2CID 144457898.
- Ostrom, Elinor (March 1998). "A behavioral approach to the rational choice theory of collective action: Presidential address, American Political Science Association, 1997" (PDF). American Political Science Review. 92 (1): 1–22. doi:10.2307/2585925. JSTOR 2585925. S2CID 140934199.
- Ostrom, Elinor (July 24, 2009). "A General Framework for Analyzing Sustainability of Social-Ecological Systems". Science. 325 (5939): 419–422. doi:10.1126/science.1172133. hdl:11059/14638. PMID 19628857.
- Ostrom, Elinor (June 2010). "Beyond markets and states: polycentric governance of complex economic systems". American Economic Review. 100 (3): 641–672. doi:10.1257/aer.100.3.641. S2CID 2371158. Pdf version.

== See also ==
- Co-production of public services by service users and communities.
- Institutional analysis and development framework (IAD)
- List of Jewish Nobel laureates

Awards
Preceded by Paul Krugman	Laureate of the Nobel Memorial Prize in Economics; 2009; Served alongside: Oliver E. Williamson	Succeeded by Peter A. Diamond; Dale T. Mortensen; Christopher A. Pissarides
