= Christopher Dow =

British economist

John Christopher Roderick Dow, FBA (1916–1998) was a British applied economist whose career ran from 1945 until his death in 1998.

He was educated at Bootham School, York and University College London.

During his career he worked in some of the major British economic institutions, serving as Senior Economic Adviser to the UK Treasury, deputy director of the National Institute of Economic and Social Research, Assistant Secretary General of the OECD, and as executive director of the Bank of England. Dow's achievements as an economist were recognized with the award of a Fellowship of the British Academy (1982).

== Major publications ==
- Major Recessions: Britain and the World, 1920-1995 (Oxford, 1999, ISBN 9780199241231 ISBN 0199241236), published posthumously
- Inside the Bank of England: Memoirs of Christopher Dow

== Additional sources ==
Dow, J. C. R., Graham Hacche, and C. T. Taylor. (2012). Inside the Bank of England memoirs of Christopher Dow, Chief Economist, 1973-84. Basingstoke: Palgrave Macmillan
