= Peter Ady =

English economist

Peter Honorine Ady (1914, Rangoon – 2004) was an Oxford economist. She was the daughter of Malcom H. Ady and Cecile Estelle Muriel DuBern.

Ady first attended Oxford as an undergraduate at Lady Margaret Hall, later becoming a tutor and then, in 1947, a fellow in economics at St Anne’s. Whilst holding a fellowship she also held a lectureship in development economics. Her notability in the wider world is evident from her work for the United Nations as an advisor to the Burmese government. She prepared a report for them on public finance and was instrumental in producing Burma's first set of integrated social accounts (1951) covering the period 1945–1950.

Between 1964 and 1966 she was seconded to the Economics Directorate of the Ministry of Overseas Development (the forerunner of Dfid). In the mid-1970s she worked as the director of Queen Elizabeth House and also at the Institute of Commonwealth Studies. Ady has also worked as a consultant to the World Bank and the United Nations Conference on Trade and Development (UNCTAD). Noted work by her includes a jointly authored report for the OECD (1962)(with Michel Courcier) of a Systems of National Accounts in Africa.

After her secondment to the Ministry of Overseas Development, her work's focus shifted to the international economic problems of the developing countries, their trade, and flows of international capital. For example, in 1972 she published Private Overseas investment and the Developing Countries, Praeger.
