= Christopher A. Pissarides =

British-Cypriot economist

Sir Christopher Pissarides
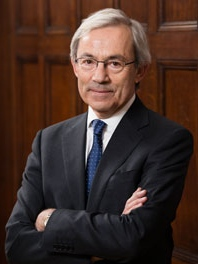
- Pissarides in 2014
- Born: 20 February 1948 (age 78); Nicosia, British Cyprus
- Citizenship: Cypriot; British

Academic background
- Education: London School of Economics (PhD); University of Essex (BSc, MSc)
- Doctoral advisor: Michio Morishima

Academic work
- Discipline: Labour economics
- Institutions: London School of Economics 1976–present University of Southampton 1974–76; University of Cyprus 2011–present Hong Kong University of Science and Technology 2013–present
- Notable ideas: Macroeconomic search and matching theories of unemployment, matching function, structural growth
- Awards: IZA Prize in Labor Economics (2006); Nobel Memorial Prize in Economic Sciences (2010)
- Website: Information at IDEAS / RePEc

Sir Christopher Antoniou Pissarides FBA (/ˌpɪsəˈriːdiːz/; Greek: Χριστόφορος Αντωνίου Πισσαρίδης; born 20 February 1948) is a Cypriot economist. He is Regius Professor of Economics at the London School of Economics, and Professor of European Studies at the University of Cyprus. His research focuses on macroeconomics, labour economics, economic growth, and economic policy. In 2010 he received the Nobel Prize in Economics along with Peter Diamond and Dale Mortensen, "for their analysis of markets with theory of search frictions."

== Early life ==
Pissarides was born in Nicosia, Cyprus, into a Greek Orthodox family from the village of Agros. He first studied at the Pancyprian Gymnasium in Nicosia. After serving in the Cypriot National Guard, he attended the University of Essex, where he received undergraduate and graduate degrees in economics. He then studied at the London School of Economics, where he received a PhD in economics, writing a thesis titled Individual behaviour in markets with imperfect information under the supervision of Michio Morishima.

== Career ==
Pissarides is Regius Professor of Economics at the London School of Economics, where he has taught since 1976. He is chairman of the Centre for Macroeconomics, which deploys economists from the University of Cambridge, the London School of Economics, the University College London, the Bank of England, and the National Institute of Economic and Social Research.

He has held a lectureship at the University of Southampton (1974–76), and visiting professorships at Harvard University (1979–80) and the University of California, Berkeley (1990–91).

He served as the chairman of the National Economy Council of the Republic of Cyprus during the country's financial crisis in 2012, and resigned to focus on his academic work at the end of 2014.

In 2018, in collaboration with Naomi Climer and Anna Thomas, he founded the Institute for the Future of Work, a London-based research and development institute exploring how new technologies transform work and working lives.

In February 2020, Greek prime minister Kyriakos Mitsotakis appointed Pissarides to the chairmanship of a committee tasked with drafting a long-term growth strategy for the country. Since September 2020 he has been chairman of the economic council of EuroAfrica Interconnector.

In June 2021, it was announced that he would lead a review into the future of work and wellbeing, a three-year collaboration between the Institute for the Future of Work, Imperial College London, and Warwick Business School, funded by a £1.8 million grant from the Nuffield Foundation. The Pissarides Review into the Future of Work and Wellbeing was launched in March 2022.

== Academic contributions ==
One of Pissarides' papers, "Job Creation and Job Destruction in the Theory of Unemployment" (with Dale Mortensen), was published in the Review of Economic Studies in 1994. He has also written the book Equilibrium Unemployment Theory, a study of the macroeconomics of unemployment.

== Awards and honours ==
- Fellow of the Econometric Society, 1997
- Fellow of the British Academy, 2002
- Fellow of the European Economic Association, 2005
- IZA Prize in Labor Economics, jointly with Dale Mortensen, 2005
- Foreign Honorary Member of the American Economic Association, 2011
- Vice-president of the European Economic Association, President in 2011
- Nobel Prize in Economics in 2010, jointly with Dale Mortensen, Peter A. Diamond, for "analysis of markets with search frictions"
- The College Historical Society of Trinity College Dublin awarded Pissarides its Gold Medal for Outstanding Contribution to Public Discourse in 2012
- In 2013, Knighted in the 2013 Birthday Honours for "services to economics."
- Member of the Academy of Athens, 2015
- Honorary Doctorate from the National and Kapodistrian University of Athens, 2025.

== Selected works ==
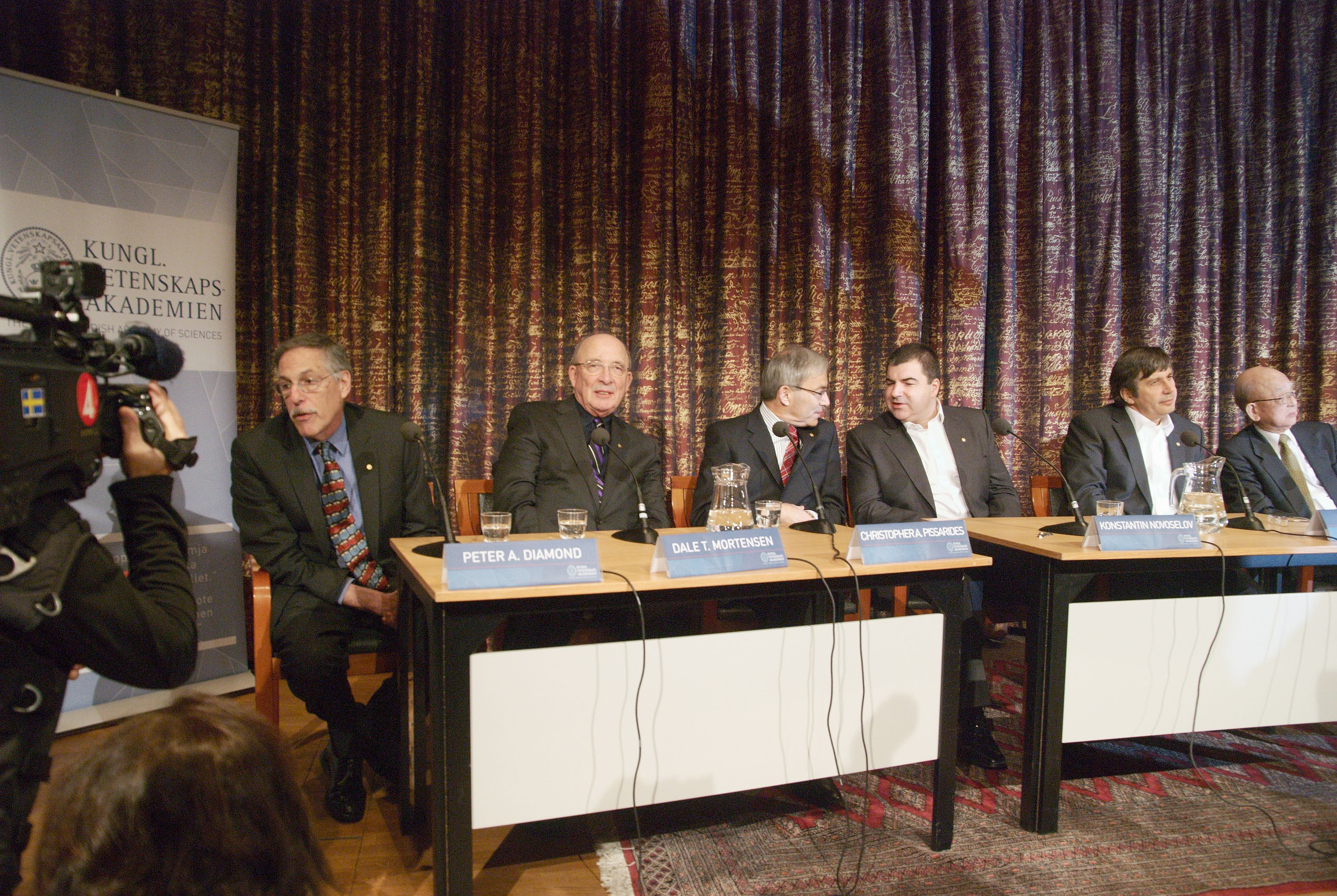
Nobel Prize laureates press conference at the KVA, 2010

- Pissarides, C. A. (1979). "Job Matchings with State Employment Agencies and Random Search". Economic Journal. 89 (356): 818–833. doi:10.2307/2231501. JSTOR 2231501.
- Pissarides, Christopher A. (1985). "Short-Run Equilibrium Dynamics of Unemployment, Vacancies, and Real Wages". American Economic Review. 75 (4): 676–690. JSTOR 1821347.
- Pissarides, Christopher; Layard, Richard; Hellwig, Martin (1986). "Unemployment and Vacancies in Britain". Economic Policy. 1 (3): 499–559. doi:10.2307/1344583. JSTOR 1344583.
- Mortensen, D. T.; Pissarides, C. A. (1994). "Job Creation and Job Destruction in the Theory of Unemployment". Review of Economic Studies. 61 (3). (with Dale Mortensen): 397–415. doi:10.2307/2297896. JSTOR 2297896.
- Equilibrium Unemployment Theory (Second ed.). Cambridge, MA: MIT Press. 2000. ISBN 978-0-262-16187-9. Description and chapter-preview links.
- Ngai, L. Rachel; Pissarides, Christopher A. (2007). "Structural Change in a Multi-Sector Model of Growth" (PDF). American Economic Review. 97 (1). (with L. Rachel Ngai): 429–443. doi:10.1257/aer.97.1.429. JSTOR 30034402. S2CID 14126725. Archived from the original (PDF) on 17 July 2012.

Awards
Preceded by Elinor Ostrom; Oliver E. Williamson	Laureate of the Nobel Memorial Prize in Economics; 2010; Served alongside: Peter A. Diamond, Dale T. Mortensen	Succeeded by Thomas J. Sargent; Christopher A. Sims
