= Institutional analysis and development framework =

Systematic method in policy analysis

The Institutional Analysis and Development framework (IAD) is a theoretical framework for investigating how people ("actors") interact with common-pool resources (CPRs). CPRs are economic goods which are rivalrous (i.e. one person's use reduces the ability of others to use) and non-excludable (i.e. it'is impractical to prevent people accessing it) - examples include forests as a source of timber, or fields as a source of pasture.

It was developed by Elinor Ostrom, an American political scientist and the first woman to receive the Nobel Memorial Prize in Economic Sciences in 2009. Ostrom researched which institutional structures supported CPR actors to sustainably use their resources, balancing individuals' use with the interests of a wider public. Under rational choice assumptions, the IAD was devised in an attempt to explain and predict outcomes by formally exploring and documenting governance structures, actors' positions, and informal and formal rules. Thus, the IAD is a systematic method to document policy analysis functions similar to analytic technique commonly used in physical and social sciences to understand how institutions operate and change over time.

== Components of the framework ==
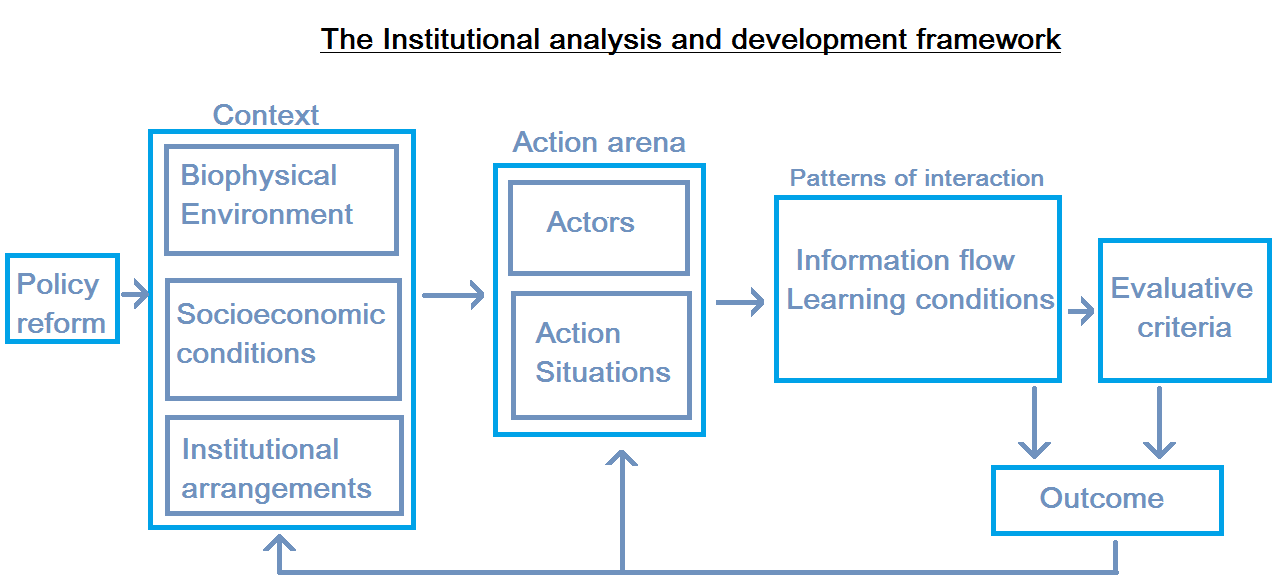
IAD framework diagram

Ostrom thought of the IAD as a "multi-level conceptual map" with which one could zoom in and out of particular hierarchical parts of the governance structures in a social system.

The IAD framework helps to make sense of complex collective action problems by dividing them into 'action arenas', that are smaller pieces of practically understandable function. The analyst assumes that the structure of the action situation is fixed in the short-term. For an action situation to exist, there must be "actors in positions" (the number of possible roles that are available in this recurring interaction situation). Actors have choices within the existing (rule) structure. In the study of outcomes from collective choice situations, actors are influenced by the institutional arrangements, the socio-economic conditions, and the physical environment. The institutional arrangements can be studied by seven rule types (as per below).

Rule types in institutional analysis
Rules	Description
Position	The number of possible "positions" actors in the action situation can assume (in terms of formal positions these might be better described as job roles, while for informal positions these might rather be social roles of some capacity
Boundary	Characteristics participants must have in order to be able to access a particular position
Choice	The action capacity ascribed to a particular position
Aggregation	Any rules relating to how interactions between participants within the action situation accumulate to final outcomes (voting schemes etc.)
Information	The types and kinds of information and information channels available to participants in their respective positions
Pay-off	The likely rewards or punishments for participating in the action situation
Scope	Any criteria or requirements that exist for the final outcomes from the action situation
