= Henry Clay (economist) =

British economist (1883–1954)

Sir Henry Clay (9 May 1883 – 30 July 1954) was a British economist and Warden of Nuffield College, Oxford.

Clay was educated at the Bradford Grammar School and University College, Oxford. He authored the 1916 book Economics. An Introduction for the General Reader.

Between 1917 and 1919 Clay worked as a temporary civil servant at the Ministry of Labour, where he worked closely with Harold Butler. In 1917 Clay helped found the Romney Street Group, a think tank which aimed to generate policies on post-war reconstruction. From 1919 and 1921 he was a fellow of New College, Oxford. In 1922 he became the Stanley Jevons Professor of Political Economy at the University of Manchester; in 1927 he became Professor of Social Economics at the University of Manchester. Between 1930 and 1944 he worked as an economic adviser to the Bank of England.

In 1944, he became Warden of Nuffield College, Oxford, in succession to Harold Butler, and retired in 1949. The foundation stone of Nuffield College was laid in 1949, shortly before his retirement as Warden. He was elected to the American Academy of Arts and Sciences in 1939. He was knighted in 1946. In 1947, he was elected to the American Philosophical Society.

Professional and academic associations
| Preceded by Frank Roby | President of the Manchester Statistical Society; 1923–25 | Succeeded by W. H. Goulty |
