= Bryan Hopkin =

British economist (1914–2009)

Sir William Aylsham Bryan Hopkin (7 December 1914 – 10 October 2009) was a Welsh economist. He was chief economic adviser to the Treasury during the tenure of Denis Healey as Chancellor of the Exchequer.

Hopkin was educated at Barry Grammar School and St John's College, Cambridge, where he was a student of John Maynard Keynes. He attended both institutions at the same time as the renowned archaeologist Glyn Daniel and economic historian Hrothgar (later Sir John) Habakkuk. In 1938 he married Renée Recour (d. 2002), and they had two sons.

In 1941, during the Second World War, Hopkin was working as a civil servant at the Ministry of Health when selected by Winston Churchill to be part of the government's statistical team. He was knighted in 1971 and became Professor of Economics at Cardiff University the following year.

Remaining a Keynesian, he was appointed head of the Government Economic Service in 1973, and served as an adviser in succession to Healey, Iain Macleod, and Anthony Barber, later emerging as a stern critic of Margaret Thatcher's economic policy.
