= Vincent Ostrom =

American academic, educator and political scientist (1919–2012)

- Born: Vincent Alfred Ostrom; September 25, 1919; Nooksack, Washington, U.S.
- Died: June 29, 2012 (aged 92)

Academic background
- Education: University of California, Los Angeles (B.A., M.A., Ph.D)

Academic work
- Discipline: Public economics Political economics
- Institutions: Indiana University

Vincent Alfred Ostrom (September 25, 1919 – June 29, 2012) was an American political economist, the founding director of the Ostrom Workshop based at Indiana University, and the Arthur F. Bentley Professor Emeritus of Political Science. He and his wife, the political economist Elinor Ostrom, made numerous contributions to the field of political science, political economy, and public choice.

The Ostroms made particular study of fragmentation theory, rational choice theory, federalism, common-pool resources and polycentrism in government. The Journal of Economic Behavior and Organization published a special issue, "Polycentric Political Economy: A Festschrift for Elinor and Vincent Ostrom", as the proceedings of a 2003 conference held in their honor, at the Mercatus Center at George Mason University.

== Education and personal life ==
Vincent Ostrom graduated from Mount Baker High School in Deming, Washington (1937), and attended Los Angeles City College (1938–1940). He received a B.A. in political science (1942) and a MA (1945) from the University of California, Los Angeles (UCLA). He received his PhD from UCLA in political science in 1950. He was married to Nobel Laureate and political scientist Elinor Ostrom (1933–2012), whom he survived by only 17 days.

== Career ==
Ostrom began working at Indiana University in 1964 as a professor of political science and co-founded the university's Ostrom Workshop in Political Theory and Policy Analysis with his wife and colleague, Elinor Ostrom. The Ostrom Workshop is committed to the collaborative engagement of faculty, students, and scholars, with a mission of advancing "the interdisciplinary study of institutions, incentives, and behavior as they relate to policy-relevant applications." The Ostrom Workshop research focuses on polycentrism, common-pool resources, and the roles of self-governance and collective action. Earlier in his career, Ostrom had held faculty positions at the University of Wyoming, the University of Oregon, and UCLA. He was a key consultant to the Alaska Constitutional Convention (1955–56) in the drafting of the Natural Resource Article of the Constitution of Alaska (Article VIII), which mandated that the state's resources were to be a public trust.

Ostrom served on the editorial board for journals such as American Political Science Review (1957–1960), Public Administration Review (Editor-in-Chief, 1963–1966), Publius: The Journal of Federalism (1972–2005), Constitutional Political Economy (1989–2012?), and International Journal of Organization Theory and Behavior (1997–2006).

== Research ==
Ostrom's work can be summarized as seeking to understand the decision-making process of individuals and the balance between group and individual interests. This study involves attention to what drives human behavior (altruism or self-interest), the effect of institutions and rules on individual and group behavior, and how institutions transform and are transformed by individuals.

Ostrom co-developed (with Charles Tiebout and Robert Warren) and refined the concept of polycentricity in public administration – or multiple, formally independent decision-making centers within a system of government. He proposed that quasi-market conditions (i.e. competition) between decision centers would increase flexibility and responsiveness. In contrast to hierarchical frameworks, polycentrism removes government from the focal point of ultimate knowledge and authority.

Ostrom was recognized for advancing rational choice theory and democratic administration not only as a means for understanding bureaucratic behavior and the provision of public services, but as a distinct theory of public administration. Rational choice theory of administration, Ostrom argued, provides a balance and foundation for public administration based on the democratic principles of the U.S. Constitution. In his 1973 book, The Intellectual Crisis in Public Administration, Ostrom outlines his observation of a breaking down of the intellectual foundation of public administration as formulated by Woodrow Wilson, concisely, the concentration of power centers in government and the separation of the will of the state (policy) from administration. He noted increases in citizen involvement in decision processes and the broad diffusion of power. A democratic administration has a more heterogeneous, "bottom, up" character in contrast with ordered, trickle-down hierarchies. Ostrom considered the hierarchical order, accountable to a single center of power, less capable of serving the diverse needs among citizens and coping with diverse conditions, and less cost efficient than a polycentric administration. Fragmentation of authority among decision centers within a jurisdiction and the overlapping of jurisdictional authority are key to advancing human welfare and a stable political order.

== Awards ==
Ostrom was honored for his excellence and contributions to the field of public policy:

- 1991 – The Daniel Elazar Distinguished Scholar Award from the American Political Science Association for his lifetime of contributions to the study of federalism and intergovernmental relations.
- 1999 – The Martha Derthick Best Book Award from the American Political Science Association, which is awarded for books published at least ten years prior with lasting contributions to the study of federalism and intergovernmental relations. Note: See Publications.
- 2003 – The Robert O. Anderson Sustainable Arctic Award from the Institute of the North for his contributions in drafting the Natural Resource Article of the Alaskan Constitution.
- 2003 – The Lifetime Achievement Award from the Atlas Economic Research Foundation for his contributions to the Workshop in Political Theory and Policy Analysis (co-recipient with Elinor Ostrom).
- 2005 – The John Gaus Distinguished Lecturer Award from the American Political Science Association for his lifetime of exemplary scholarship in political science and public administration.
- 2010 – Co-recipient (with Elinor Ostrom) of The University Medal (2010), Indiana University.

== Publications ==
Ostrom has written extensively on topics such as water usage policy, political economy, federalism, metropolitan government, and public choice. His list of publications include greater than 120 journal articles, chapters in books and proceedings, monographs, and books. A selection is noted below:

- Water and Politics: A Study of Water Policies and Administration in the Development of Los Angeles. Los Angeles: The Haynes Foundation, 1953
- Ostrom, Vincent; Ostrom, Elinor (May 1965). "A Behavioral Approach to the Study of Intergovernmental Relations Elinor Ostrom". The Annals of the American Academy of Political and Social Science (359): 137–146. doi:10.1177/000271626535900115. JSTOR 1035116. S2CID 153347659.
- Understanding Urban Government: Metropolitan Reform Reconsidered with Robert Bish. Washington, D.C.: American Enterprise Institute, 1973
- "Religion and the Constitution of the American Political System". Emory Law Journal 39(1) (Winter 1990), pp. 165–190
- The Meaning of American Federalism: Constituting a Self-Governing Society. San Francisco: Institute for Contemporary Studies Press. 1994. ISBN 978-1558153936 – via Internet Archive.
- "Epistemic Choice and Public Choice." Public Choice 77(1) (September 1993), pp. 163–176
- "The Quest for Meaning in Public Choice," with Elinor Ostrom. The American Journal of Economics and Sociology 63(1) (January 2004): pp. 105–147 Online
- The Political Theory of a Compound Republic: Designing the American Experiment (3rd ed.). Lanham, MD: Lexington Books. 2008. 1st ed. 1971; 2nd ed. 1987
- The Intellectual Crisis in American Public Administration. University of Alabama Press. 1974. ISBN 978-0817348175.
- The Meaning of Democracy and the Vulnerability of Democracies: A Response to Tocqueville's Challenge. Ann Arbor: University of Michigan Press. 1997.
- Rethinking Institutional Analysis and Development ([1988] 1993, with David Feeny and Hartmut Picht)
- Ostrom, Vincent; Bish, Robert; Ostrom, Elinor (1988). Local Government in the United States – via Internet Archive.
- The Quest to Understand Human Affairs: Natural Resources Policy and Essays on Community and Collective Choice, vol. 1 (2011, edited by Barbara Allen)
- The Quest to Understand Human Affairs: Essays on Collective, Constitutional, and Epistemic Choice, vol. 2 (2012, edited by Barbara Allen)
