= Youth unemployment =

Situation of young people who are willing to work but unable to find a job

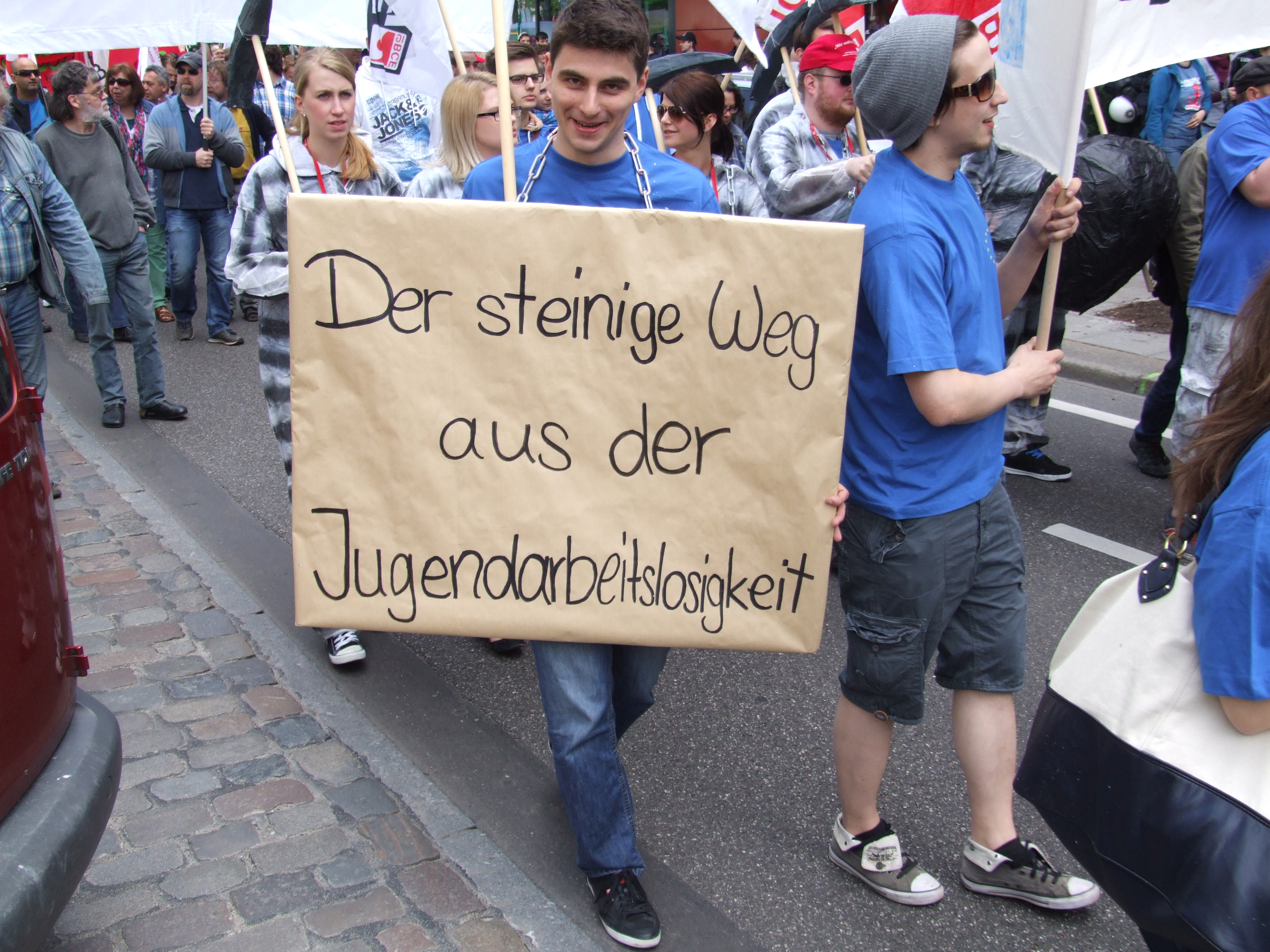
A youth unemployment protest in Hamburg, Germany, on 1 May 2014. A man holds up a sign reading: "The rocky road out of youth unemployment"

Youth unemployment refers to the proportion of the labor force aged 15–24 who do not have a job but are seeking employment. Young adult unemployment refers to unemployment among ages 25–34.

Youth unemployment is different from unemployment in the general workforce in that youth unemployment rates are consistently higher than those of adults worldwide, with the European Commission reporting that, between 2014 and 2024, the EU youth unemployment rate has remained approximately twice as high as the general unemployment rate. Youth unemployment is a complex issue because it often intersects with other socio-economic inequalities like racism, class, gender, and caste.

== Background ==
Unemployment rate for young people

Youth unemployment rate in OECD countries (15–24 age)

Around 17 percent of the world population, or almost 1.26 billion people, is between the ages of 15 and 24. The United Nations defines this age range as the period when compulsory education typically ends. Of this category, around 87% live in developing countries.

The time period spanning youth is a social construct and differs from internationally. Most European young adults are likely to live with their parents longer than those in the United States; while other young adults, like those in South Korea, may have compulsory military service.

Different definitions of unemployment can result in inconsistent reports on youth unemployment rates. Some countries do not consider people unemployed if they are not actively seeking work.

== Causes ==
There are multiple and complex causes behind youth unemployment.

=== From education to employment: the skills crisis ===
The quality and relevance of education is often considered to be the root cause of youth unemployment. In 2010, 25 out of 27 developed countries stated the highest unemployment rates were among people with primary education or less. Yet, high education did not guarantee or even promise a decent job. In Tunisia, 40% of university graduates are unemployed against the 24% of non-graduates. This affects highly educated young women in particular. " In Turkey, the unemployment rate among university educated women is 3 times higher than that of university educated men. in Iran and the United Arab Emirates, it is nearly 3 times; and in Saudi Arabia, it is 8 times".

Beyond the necessity to ensure its access to all, education is not adequately tailored to the needs of the labour market, which in turns leads to two consequences: the inability for young people to find jobs and the inability for employers to hire the skills they need. Combined with the economic crisis and the lack of sufficient job creation in many countries, it has resulted in high unemployment rates around the world and the development of a skills crisis. Surveys suggest that up to half of all businesses have open positions for which they are struggling to find suitably qualified people. One global survey found that more than 55% of employers worldwide believe there is a "skill crisis" as businesses witness a growing mismatch between the skills students learn in the education system and those required in the workplace. For many governments, a key question is how they can bridge this gap and ensure that young people are equipped with the skills employers are looking for.

=== Labour markets and regulations ===
Supply and demand curve

First, a high level of employment protection regulations causes employers to be cautious about hiring more than a minimum number of workers, since they cannot easily be laid off during a downturn, or fired if a new employee should turn out to be unmotivated or incompetent. Second, the development of temporary forms of work such as internships, seasonal jobs and short-term contracts have left many young workers in precarious situations. Because their jobs are temporary, youths are often the first to be laid off when a company downsizes. If they are laid off, youths are typically not eligible for redundancy payments because they only worked with the company for a short period of time. Once this work ends, many find themselves unemployed and disadvantaged in the job search. However, some youths begin working part-time while pursuing their tertiary education. This rate is low in countries like Italy, Spain and France, but in the United States, nearly one-third of students balance both education and work.

The legitimacy of internships has begun to be questioned. The purpose of internships is to allow students or recent graduates to acquire work experience ( or a recommendation letter to add to their curriculum vitae). However, many interns have complained that they are simply performing basic grunt work, rather than learning important knowledge and skills. Whether or not these internship positions are now violating the federal rules that are in place to govern programmes such as internships remains to be seen. Their internship(s) however, seems to be the only viable alternative to job placement for the young individuals. With little to no job growth occurring, the unemployment rate among those fresh out of college and at the later end of the 15–24 aged students is approximately 13.2% as of April 2012.

=== Assistance and dependency ===
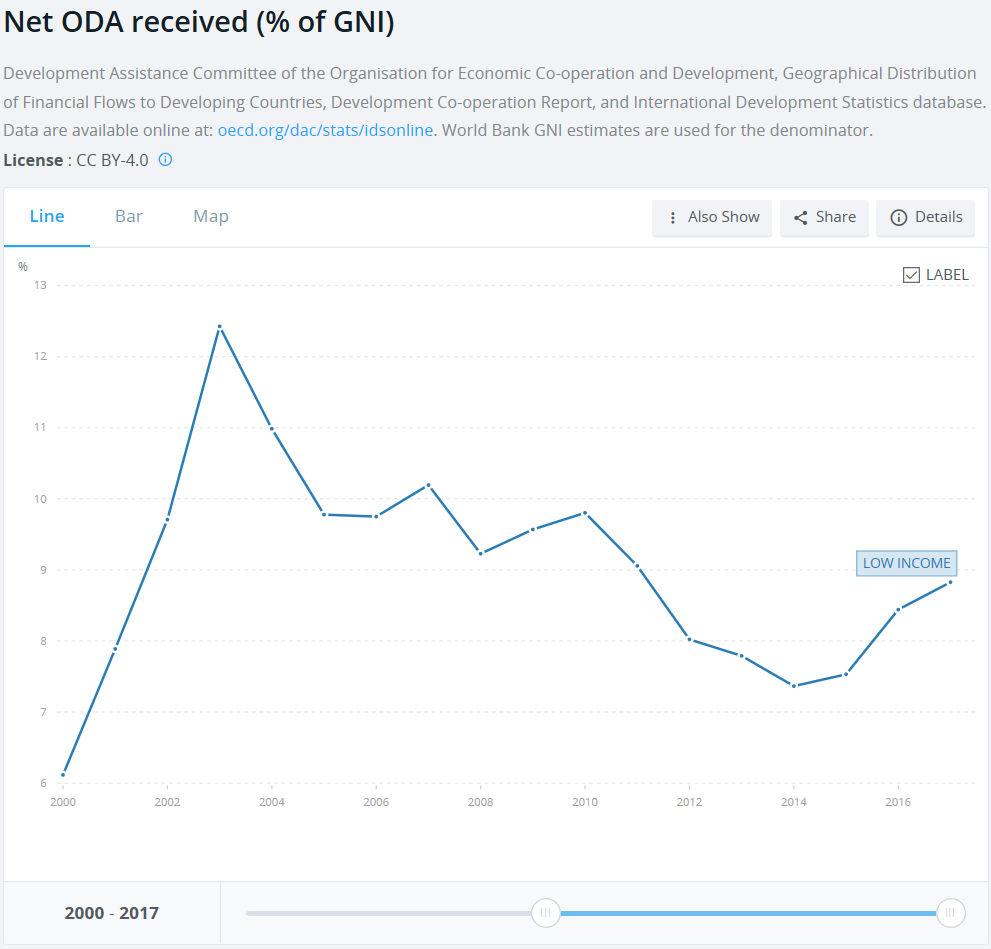
The trend of aid dependency in low income country

Many countries around the world provide income assistance to support unemployed youths until their labour market and economic conditions improve. Although this support is strictly related to obligations in terms of active job search and training, it has led to an emerging debate on whether or not it creates dependency among the youth and has a detrimental effect on them. In September 2014, David Cameron announced that he plans to cut housing and employment benefits for 18- to 21-year-olds by £3,000 to £23,000 to reduce dependency on government assistance and redirect funding to targeted programs for increased learning and training opportunities. The prime minister states, "At heart, I want us to effectively abolish youth unemployment. I want us to end the idea that aged 18 you can leave school, go and leave home, claim unemployment benefit and claim housing benefit." Under this plan, "most unemployed 18 to 21-year-olds would also be barred [preventing them] from claiming housing benefit in order to leave home."

=== Spatially Concentrated Poverty and Urbanization ===
Earlier discussions, such as John Kain's 1968 Spatial Mismatch Hypothesis, focused on geographic barriers to job access, particularly the physical distance between where low-income youth live and where jobs are located. However, social access plays a more significant role, especially in urban areas. Many jobs, especially low-skilled ones and increasingly those requiring higher skills, are often obtained through personal networks. These networks not only help secure positions but also provide early information about job openings. As a result, youth living in high-poverty, spatially isolated communities often lack access to such networks, leaving them at a disadvantage and further trapping them in cycles of poverty with limited opportunities for upward mobility.

In addition, there is a crisis of high neighborhood joblessness in some cities, which has even more severe consequences than high neighborhood poverty. There is a meaningful difference between being poor and employed and being poor and unemployed.

== Debates and Socio-Economic Theories ==
Debates surrounding the causes of youth unemployment often center on whether it stems primarily from individual factors, such as youth behavior, educational attainment, and employer preferences, or from broader structural issues, including market dynamics, political economy, geographic disparities, and access to resources. Scholars have drawn on various social and economic theories to analyze these causes. For example, Davis and Moore's functional theory of stratification argues that social inequality serves a purpose in motivating individuals to pursue education and skilled occupations, thereby ensuring that the most qualified fill the most important societal roles. In contrast, conflict theories, including those derived from Marxist analysis and dual labor market theory, attribute persistent unemployment and unequal job access to structural and class-based inequalities within the labor market.

Some economists suggest that employment outcomes are primarily determined by the demand for an individual's skills and that income reflects productivity. Critics of this perspective, including scholars of socio-economic inequality, argue that such explanations may overlook historical and systemic factors that contribute to disparities in education, skill development, and employment opportunities, particularly among racial minority youth. These scholars contend that focusing solely on individual-level explanations risks oversimplifying a complex issue and may obscure the broader socio-political dimensions of youth unemployment.

=== State provisioning versus private sector approaches ===
Debates about how best to address youth unemployment often involve differing views on the appropriate role of the public sector. Some scholars and policymakers advocate for state-led reforms, including improvements in public education, changes to the criminal justice system, the strengthening of affirmative action and anti-discrimination laws, and the provision of childcare for young parents. Others support housing policy reforms aimed at integrating diverse income groups, as well as public sector employment initiatives such as infrastructure projects. Proponents of these measures argue that such programs can simultaneously create jobs and enhance worker productivity and mobility, for instance by reducing commute times through reduced traffic congestion.

Critics of public sector interventions raise concerns about their effectiveness, noting that increased education requirements for many jobs, such as the need for a high school diploma or bachelor's degree, may limit access for low-skilled workers. In light of these limitations, some scholars and practitioners have suggested private-sector and community-based strategies to reduce youth unemployment, particularly among racial minority groups. These approaches include community development programs, increases in the minimum wage, prisoner reentry support, and targeted fatherhood initiatives aimed at young Black men. The establishment of for-profit and nonprofit job placement centers in urban areas has also been proposed as a way to connect young people to employment, provide training in transferable skills, and foster social and professional networks. Some analysts highlight the role of Black- and minority-owned businesses in these efforts, suggesting that such enterprises may be better positioned to engage with marginalized youth due to shared cultural and experiential backgrounds.

== By region ==
The individual experiences of youth unemployment vary from country to country. Definitions of youth can also vary from country to country so examination of particular countries gives a greater insight into the causes and consequences of youth unemployment.

=== Africa ===
African countries define youth as someone from as young as 15 to someone well into their mid thirties, which varies from the standardized definition of the United Nations. Africa has the youngest population of any continent which means that the problem of youth unemployment in the continent is particularly relevant. Although youth unemployment is high, this does not necessarily make the causes of unemployment youth-specific; many of the causes of unemployment are due to poor infrastructure or insufficient educational qualifications that mainly affect older and younger Africans alike. Approximately 200 million people in Africa are between the ages of 15 and 24. This number is expected to double in size in the next 30 years. Between 2001 and 2010, countries in Africa reported some of the world's fasted growing economies. In Africa, the messages the youth are receiving from schools and adults is to become job creators rather than job-seekers, which encourages them to become entrepreneurs. Every year, up to 12 million graduates are entering the labour market and only 3 million of them are getting jobs. This shows that "the mountain of youth unemployment is rising annually."

=== Armenia ===
It is interesting to observe a very high unemployment rate among the young population of Armenia (34%) even though a very large number of Armenian youth are considered highly educated. Almost 99% of the population has completed secondary education, and 33.4% have got a university/college education. A significant portion of the unemployed derives from the people with low levels of education; however, the percentage of unemployment among the more educated young people is also very high. In general, one of the main problems in the Armenian labor market is the mismatch between supply and demand. The high level of youth unemployment is a priority issue. In Armenia, the unemployment rate among the population aged 15–24 was 32.6% in 2019. However, the employment rate between ages 19–25 are much higher as 64.6% of young men and 52.3% of women are reported to have jobs. This study also shows that the youth are less involved in industry and chemical production, although there is a demand for young people in those areas.

The Statistical Committee of the Republic of Armenia has reported the following data:

- The unemployment rate in Armenia decreased to 13.00% in June 2022 from March 2022
- The quarterly updated unemployment rate for Armenia has an average rate of 17.40% and is available from March 2008 to June 2022.
- The information peaked at 21.10% in March 2019 and fell to a record low of 13.00% in June 2022.

According to the most recent statistics, 2.96 million people called Armenia home in December 2021.

=== Canada ===
While Canada's economy recovered from the 2008 global recession more smoothly than anticipated, in 2012, 14.3% of Canadian youth were unemployed. According to Statistics Canada, unemployment rose up from 11.2% in 2007 and doubled the current national jobless rate of 7.2%. This amounted to the biggest gap between youth and adult unemployment rates since 1977. The average post-secondary graduate carries $28,000 in student debt in Canada. The unemployment rate for Canadian young people is about double that of the rest of the population. In Ontario, the rate of unemployment for those between the ages of 15–24 hovers around 13%. In 2012, the percentage of youth in Ontario who actually had a job did not rise above 52%. Toronto's youth unemployment rate was at 18% at the same time, but only 43% of the area's youth were employed, therefore being the lowest rate in the province.

=== Denmark ===
As of July 2013, the unemployment rate for 16- to 24-year-olds stood at 5.2%. In comparison to other countries, the rate is low. Youth unemployment stood at 16% in the United States and 11.6% in Hong Kong in September 2013. In 2008, 48% of students age 16 and 70% of students ages 23–24 held jobs. The average age of first employment is 22 years old. Typically, young Danes will spend 4.5 years out of the first five years of leaving education in employment. This is higher than the 4.4 years recorded in Australia, Switzerland, and Netherlands.

In order for unemployed Danes to collect insurance benefits, one must be registered as unemployed at Denmark’s Public Employment Service (PES) and actively search for a job. PES offers programs to combat youth unemployment. One package offered to 18- to 19-year-olds includes an interview one week after applying for welfare benefits, a job-search training course within the first two weeks, and an educational opportunity or work placement offered no later than one month after the beginning of the unemployed period. For 18- to 30-year-olds, PES is obliged to refer new graduates under 30 to a private provider after six weeks of unemployment.

=== European Union ===
Due to the great recession in Europe, in 2009, only 15% of males and 10% of females between ages 16–19 in were employed full-time. The youth employment rate in the European Union reached an all-time low of 32.9% in the first half of 2011. Of the countries in the European Union, Germany sticks outs with its low rate of 7.9%. Some critics argue that the decrease of the youth unemployment began even before the economic downturn, countries such as Greece and Spain.

In October 2019, 3.2 million young people (under 25) were unemployed in the EU-28, of whom 2.26 million were in the euro area. The youth unemployment rate was 14.4% in the EU-28 and 15.6% in the euro area, compared with about 25% in 2013. The lowest rates were observed in Czechia (5.5%) and Germany (5.8%), while the highest were recorded in Greece (33.1% in the second quarter of 2019), Spain (32.8%) and Italy (27.8%).

Various countries have enacted a Youth Guarantee plan targeting youth unemployment.

=== France ===
In 2017 the youth unemployment rate in France was 22.3%, relatively high compared to the overall unemployment rate of 8.9%. France has one of the highest rates of youth unemployment among the EU countries, trailing behind Greece, Spain, Italy and Portugal.

The level of education is a factor that affects unemployment for the French youth population. Those who do not enter into higher education programmes have an employment rate of 30% which is exceedingly low compared to an employment rate of more than 80% for those who entered into higher education. France also experiences a large high school drop out rate, resulting in a high population of low-skilled youth workers. Lacking vocational training or adequate skills that employers look for, many French youths are without options for employment.

This issue of unemployment has been on the French agenda for decades and has prompted many efforts to reduce its impact. In 2010 France established a labour law to set a statutory minimum wage for the youth population. Also, public programmes include the promotion of job training to better equip workers to enter novel positions, creating more jobs particularly for low-skilled workers, and reducing labour costs through subsidies and other efforts.

Compared to other highly developed and OECD member countries, France displays higher unemployment rates as well as longer duration. From 1983 to 2018 youth unemployment rate in France experienced an overall increase. It averaged at a rate of 20.19% reaching a max of 26.2% in 2012.

From 1979 to 1984, France saw its legislated minimum wage, the SMIC (salaire minimum interprofessional de croissance), rise sharply. Historically, a rise in the SMIC has shown to result in increased unemployment rates amongst the country's youth population. At the end of this period, the unemployment rate for youths was 26%, almost double the average OECD youth unemployment rate. France also saw double digit declines in active youths in the labour market from the years 1980–2007.

In an effort to combat youth unemployment, France attempted to improve their education system because France saw its declining rates of unemployment amongst those who have received higher levels of education. The less educated however, not only experienced increased unemployment rates, but longer durations of being jobless. For instance, in 1996, 58% of the low educated labour market population experienced an average of one year of unemployment. But France has made achievements in increasing higher education amongst its youth, attaining the Europe 2020 target of reducing early school leaving to below 10%. They offer mostly free higher education and the French government also supplies students with stipends.

Like other countries in the European Union, France has enacted school-to-work policies in order to facilitate the school-to-work transition for youths once they have completed their higher education. They have longer transition time for students entering the work force and include offers newly graduated students several tools to enhance their market inclusion. The government has taken several measures in an effort to lower labour costs such as subsidized employment contracts and multiple VET placements. However, these policies have appeared to return minor results as the country continues to report high youth unemployment rates especially among differing social classes. First, they are less effective among the youth migrant population who face disconnect from the labour market due to France's employment-centred economy experiencing, on average, unemployment rates that are 4% higher than non-migrant workers. Furthermore, there is also prevalent gender disparities among the younger population.

=== Greece ===
Youth unemployment levels in Greece remain one of the highest in the world. According to one source, between 2000 and 2008, youth inactivity increased from 63% to 72%. A different source using the harmonized definition of unemployment lists the unemployment rate of youth up to 24 years of age as 24.2% in Greece during 2009. To put this into perspective, the EU-27 average at the time was 18.3%. Youth unemployment rose to 40.1% in May 2011 and then again to about 55% in November 2012.

In addition to youth unemployment (namely those up to 25 years of age), Greece also faced severe graduate unemployment of those 25–29 years of age. In 1998, Greece had the highest level of unemployment of higher education graduates in the 25–29 year old age group. This was due to a lack of demand for highly educated personnel at the time. This trend of low employment among those with higher educational qualifications continues on today. As recently as 2009, "one in three higher education graduates, two in three secondary graduates, and one in three compulsory education graduates have not found some form of stable employment." This lack of employment is thought to have contributed to the feelings of frustration among youth that eventually led to the 2008 Greek riots.

These high levels of unemployment are exacerbated by the failure of unions to attract young workers. GSEE's Young Workers Committee revealed in a 2008 presentation that almost two-thirds of young workers did not join their workplace unions. Although unions like GSEE and ADEDY actively promote wage increases through collective bargaining efforts and have contributed to obtaining higher wages for young workers, the wages of young workers remained much lower than almost all other countries in EU-15.

=== India ===
The youth unemployment rate was around 10% in 2005, but they have not reliably reported statistics to the United Nations over the years. However, there has been an increase in young adults remaining in school and getting additional degrees simply because there are not opportunities for employment. These youth are typically of a lower class, but it can represent a wide variety of individuals across races and classes. In India, the employment system is often reliant on connections or government opportunities.

=== Italy ===
Within the Eurozone, only Greece and Spain display higher rates of youth unemployment than Italy. Similarly to Spain, the percentage of people aged 15–24 excluded from the labour market rose after the 2008 financial crisis. Between 2008 and 2014, youth unemployment rose by 21.5%. By that year, almost 43% of the young were excluded from the labour market in Italy. Furthermore, youth unemployment is unequally distributed throughout the country. In the third quarter of 2014, only 29.7% of the young were unemployed in the North. This number increases to an alarming 51.5% when looking at the South of Italy.

=== Jordan ===
There are 15 million unemployed young men in Arab communities. The youth unemployment rate in Jordan has traditionally been much higher than other countries. In the past ten years, the rate has stayed around 23%. There has been a recent increase in the popular belief that unemployment is the fault of the individual and not a societal problem. However, youth unemployment has also been attributed to increased pressure on service sectors that typically employ more youth in Jordan. Youth unemployment has led to later and later ages of marriage in Jordan, which some view as one of the most important consequences of the phenomenon. Another consequence experienced in Jordan is increased mental health problems. In 2019, the estimated youth unemployment rate in Jordan was at 35%.

=== Kenya ===
Kenya, which one of the quickest growing economies in Sub-Saharan Africa, averaging GDP growth of 5.7% in 2019, has one of the highest youth unemployment rates in East Africa and data from the country's recent census indicates a worsening unemployment for youth aged between 18 and 34 years. According to the 2019 census, more than a third of Kenya's youths eligible for work have no jobs. A total of 5,341,182 (38.9%) of the 13,777,600 young Kenyans are jobless. The conventional population of youth aged 18 to 34 is 13.7 million, out of which 61% are working while 1.6 million are seeking work or indicated that there was no work available.

Kenya's young people are considered to be a key resource in the economic transformation of the country. With at least 20% of the country's population between the age of 15 to 24, the East African nation has been touted as one of the countries that can reap a demographic dividend by providing the appropriate education and jobs to its growing youth population. Demographic Divided refers to the economic gain a country can attain when it has a bigger working age population more than a non-working one contributing to the economy.

The Kenyan government continues to make some strides in trying to tackle the high youth unemployment by coming up with various programs under affirmative action. This include the National Youth Service, The National Youth Enterprise Development Fund, The Women Enterprise Fund, Kazi Mtaani and Ajira Digital, which is empowering youth with digital skills to enable them tap in the digital economy. According to a 2021 report by the ministry of ICT, Innovations and Youth Affairs, 5 per cent of Kenyans (1.3 million) were as at June 2021 working online through the Ajira Digital Program.

The Kenya Youth Development Policy 2019, which was launched on 12 August 2020 during the national celebrations of International Youth Day, recognizes the creativity, innovativeness, and productivity presented by youth and their potential to become transformative leaders as key strengths, and promises to harness these strengths for the realization of the demographic dividend. The policy provides a framework to address some of the challenges faced by youth in Kenya, including lack of decent jobs.

=== Nigeria ===
Unemployment rate has more than tripled since 2016 when the economy went into recession. The country witnessed another recession in 2020.

The NBS, in its report, said the number of active working population in December 2020, representing those within the age bracket of 15–64 years, was 122.05 million Nigerians.

Nigeria surpassed South Africa on a list of 82 countries whose unemployment rates were tracked, with Namibia leading the list with 33.4 percent.

=== Russia ===
Youth unemployment in Russia was over 18% in 2010. However, there was a wide variance in levels of unemployment in Russia just a few years earlier, that continued through the 2008 economic crisis. In 2005, the area around Moscow had an unemployment rate of just 1% while the Dagestan region had a rate over 22%. This may be partially attributed to the differences in levels of development in the region. It has been found that the higher the level of development in a region, the lower the level of both overall and youth-specific unemployment. In Russia, the main cause of youth unemployment has been attributed to lower levels of human capital.

=== South Africa ===
Starting in the 1970s, youth unemployment has been rising at a steady rate in South Africa. Today, South Africa is ranked as the fourth country with the highest percentage of unemployed youth in the world. As of 2014, 52.6% of the people aged 15–24 actively looking for a job were unemployed. Furthermore, youth unemployment is unequally distributed throughout different segments of the population. While unemployment between young whites amounts to 12%, this number skyrockets to a troubling 70% between young blacks. It may be that remnant effects of the apartheid era has led to jobs centres being located farther away from typical homes of black communities compared to white communities. This, lingering discrimination, and unequal backgrounds are among the many reasons for the lopsided distribution of unemployment among young white and black South Africans.

Many of the unemployed youth have never worked before. A proposed reason for this is that South Africa's social pension programme is relatively generous compared to other middle-income countries. Some senior South Africans (mostly applicable to the white population) are paid almost twice the per capita income. This has led to many of the unemployed youth surviving off of their elders' support, thereby reducing incentives to look for employment. In addition, the reservation wages of many young Africans are prohibitively high. Around 60% of males and 40% of females have reservation wages that are higher than they could expect from smaller sized firms. Some overestimate their ability to obtain jobs from competitive, high-paying, larger sized firms and thus remain unemployed. The higher pay of larger firms, in addition to the costs of employment (such as transport or housing costs), make it almost unfeasible for some youth to accept lower paying jobs from smaller firms. Thus, many of the youth in South Africa choose to remain unemployed until they are able to find a job at a larger firm.

South African youth also face problems of education. Many exit the schooling system early. Others face a lack of skill recognition from employers, "even if they have qualifications in the fields that are considered to be in high demand." In the first quarter of 2020, there were 20.4 million young people aged 15–34 years. These young people accounted for 63.3% of the total number of unemployed persons. The unemployment rate within this group was 43.2% in the 1st quarter of 2020. The youth aged 15–24 years are the most vulnerable in the South African labour market as the unemployment rate among this age group was 59.0% in the 1st quarter of 2020. Among graduates in this age group, the unemployment rate was 33.1% during this period compared to 24.6% in the 4th quarter of 2019 – an increase of 8.5 percentage points quarter-on-quarter.

=== Spain ===
In recent decades, the issue of youth unemployment has assumed alarming proportions in Spain. The country was dramatically affected by the 2008 financial crisis and the number of young unemployed skyrocketed during this period. Within OECD countries, Spain displayed the most significant increases in terms of job losses within those aged 15–24. By 2014, 57.9% of the youth in Spain was unemployed. This was due to the failed implementation of effective employment policies and the increased segmentation of the labour marked during the economic recession are thought to be the main causes behind such an alarming situation.

As of April 2024, the youth unemployment in Spain stands at 26.5%. By gender, male youth unemployment is at 27.4%, while female youth unemployment is at 25.3%.

=== United Kingdom ===
Youth unemployment in the United Kingdom is the level of unemployment among young people, typically defined as those aged 18–25. A related concept is graduate unemployment which is the level of unemployment among university graduates. Statistics for June 2010 show that there are 926,000 young people under the age of 25 who are unemployed which equates to an unemployment rate of 19.6% among young people. This is the highest youth unemployment rate in 17 years. In November 2011 youth unemployment hit 1.02 million, but had fallen to 767,000 by August 2014. The high levels of youth unemployment in the United Kingdom have led some politicians and media commentators to talk of a "lost generation".

=== United States ===
In the United States, the issue of youth unemployment intersects with racial inequalities, resulting in a more complex crisis. There is more pronouncedly high youth unemployment in inner cities of urban areas with high concentrations of poverty, which intersect with high racial minority populations. In particular, young Black men are the most vulnerable to youth unemployment. The 1965 Moynihan report, published by Daniel Patrick Moynihan, predicted that youth unemployment among young Black men would only continue to increase. This prediction remained accurate throughout the 90s and through to the 2000s as well. Moynihan attributed this high unemployment to several factors, including employers' reluctance to hire young Black men due to negative stereotypes as well as issues related to low skill levels, delinquency, and a general sense of discouragement toward pursuing employment or higher education among young Black men.

There are many causes of youth unemployment, and even more emerge when the issue is viewed through the lens of race relations. In some cities in the United States, geographic disparities related to urbanization and spatially concentrated poverty have exacerbated the unemployment crisis. This issue became more pronounced following the suburbanization of American cities, marked by the migration of middle and high-income (disproportionately white) families to suburbs on the periphery outside the urban core.

In 2007, before the Great Recession began in the United States, youth unemployment was already at 13%. By 2008, this rate had jumped to 18% and in 2010 it had climbed to just under 21%. The length of time the youth were unemployed expanded compared to prior recessions. Many youth in the United States remained unemployed after more than 12 months of searching for a job. This has caused the emergence of a scarred generation. An estimated 9.4 million young people aged 16 to 24 in the United States, that is 12.3%, were neither working nor in school.

In July 2026, 21.3 million people ages 16 to 24 were employed in the United States. Their employment-population ratio was 53.8 percent, while their unemployment rate was 9.1 percent, down from 10.8 percent in July 2025. These July figures are not seasonally adjusted because the Bureau of Labor Statistics analysis focuses on the seasonal changes that occur during spring and summer. However, by August 2024, young workers began to see significant wage increases. In response to difficulties in filling job vacancies, businesses raised wages for teenage workers by 36%, with the average hourly pay reaching $15.68. This wage boost helped attract more young people into the workforce, contributing to a reduction in youth unemployment.

== Effects ==
=== Lost generation ===
The unemployed youth has become to be called "a lost generation". It is not only because of loss of productivity but also because of the long-term direct and indirect impact unemployment has on young people and their families. Unemployment has been said to affect earnings for about 20 years. Because youths are unable to garner skills or work experience during their first years in the workforce, they see a decrease in lifetime earnings when compared to those who had steady work or those who were unemployed as an adult. A lower salary can persist for 20 years following the unemployed period before the individual begins earning competitively to their peers. Widespread youth unemployment also leads to a socially excluded generation at great risk for poverty. For example, Spain saw an 18% increase in income inequality.

The lost generation effect impacts also their families. Youth in many countries now live with their parents into their late twenties. This contributes to what is called the "full-nest syndrome". In 2008, 46% of 18- to 34-year-olds in the European Union lived with at least one parent; in most countries the stay-at-homes were more likely to be unemployed than those who had moved out. In families, it is common that when one person becomes unemployed, other members of the family begin looking for or securing employment. This is called the added worker effect. This can sometimes take the form of employment in the informal sector when necessary. Alongside the shift in youth living situations, the impact of returning to live with parents as well as difficulty finding a fulfilling job lead to mental health risks. Being unemployed for a long period of time in youth has been correlated to decreased happiness, job satisfaction and other mental health issues. Unemployed youth also report more isolation from their community. Youths who are neither working nor studying do not have the opportunity to learn and improve their social and interactive skills. They become progressively marginalised from the labour market and in turn can develop an anti-social behaviour.

=== Lack of innovation ===
The economic crisis has led to a global decrease in competitiveness. "There is a risk of loss of talent and skills since a great amount of university graduates are unable to find a job and to put their knowledge and capabilities into producing innovation and contributing to economic growth". Excluding young people from the labour market means lacking the divergent thinking, creativity and innovation that they naturally offer. This fresh thinking is necessary for employers to foster new designs and innovative ideas. Fighting youth unemployment is therefore key to maintaining the economic performance of a country.

=== Social stability ===
Youth unemployment is often seen as a key driver of revolution, political instability, societal upheaval, and conflict against the government or state. Historically, high levels of youth unemployment have been linked to significant political and social change, including the overthrow of established political systems. Major events such as the Arab Spring, Russian Civil War and the French Revolution all largely being caused by large scale youth unemployment.

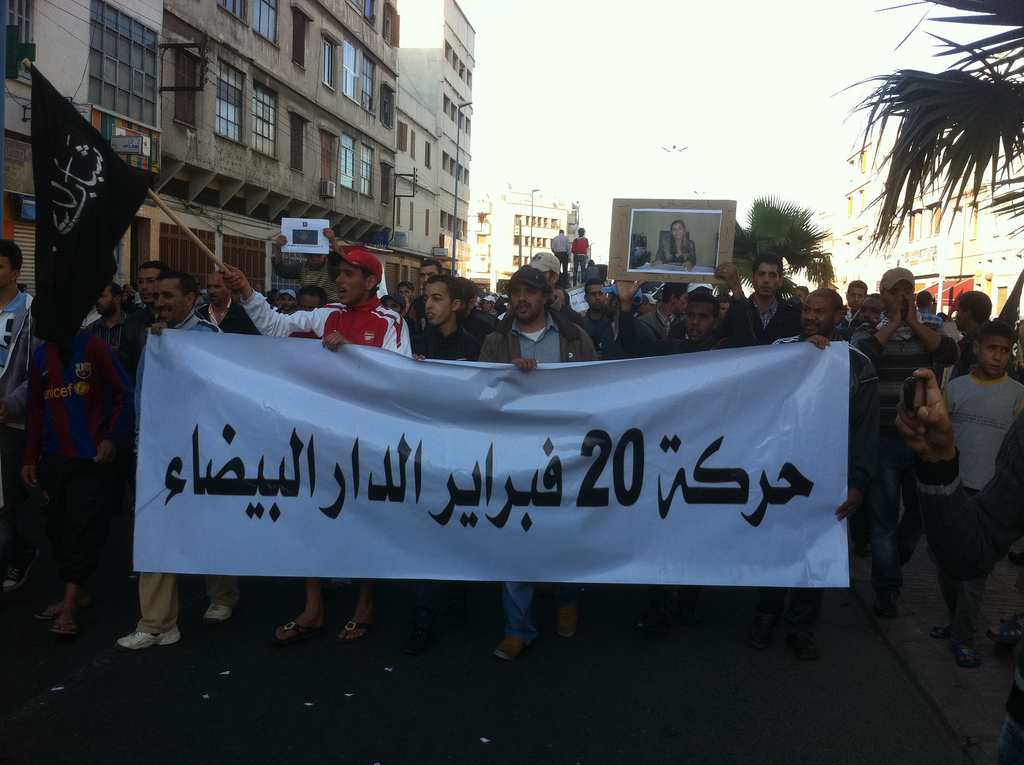
2011 Moroccan protests

The rise of political unrest and anti-social behaviour in the world has been recently attributed to youth unemployment. During the course of 2011 it became a key factor in fuelling protests around the globe. Within twelve months, four regimes (Tunisia, Egypt, Libya, Yemen) in the Arab World fell in the wake of the protests led by young people. Riots and protests similarly engulfed a number of European and North American cities (Spain, France, United Kingdom between 2008 and 2011 for example). The lack of productive engagement of young people in wider society, underlined by high levels of unemployment and under-employment, only serves to add to this feeling of disenfranchisement.

Youth unemployment also dramatically increases public spending at times when economies are struggling to remain competitive and social benefits increase along with an aging population. Youth unemployment has direct costs such as increased benefit payments, lost income-tax revenues and wasted capacity. "In Britain a report by the London School of Economics (LSE), the Royal Bank of Scotland and the Prince's Trust puts the cost of the country's 744,000 unemployed youngsters at £155m ($247m) a week in benefits and lost productivity". Similarly, the economic loss from youth unemployment in Europe is estimated at €153 billion or 1.2% of GDP in 2011.

Youth unemployment has indirect costs too, including emigration. Young people leave their countries in hope to find employment elsewhere. This brain drain has contributed to deteriorating countries' competitiveness, especially in Europe.

=== Incarceration and mortality ===
A 2015 study showed that New York City's 'Summer Youth Employment Program' decreased the participants' probability of incarceration and probability of mortality.

== Effects of minimum wages ==
Economic research indicates that minimum wages increases youth unemployment in competitive labour markets for unskilled youth labour, and that the resulting delayed entry into the job market (for youths who are unable to obtain a job) leads to a reduction in training opportunities and thus a reduction in lifetime income. However, research also indicates that "imposing a minimum wage may increase the income of working youths if their hours of work are not reduced in response to the minimum wage" and "minimum wages may increase the aggregate income of youths if the gains for those who work exceed the losses for those who cannot find work." As a policy measure to support young unskilled workers, economist Charlene Marie Kalenkoski suggests that "instead of a minimum wage, policymakers should use less distortionary means to support young unskilled workers, such as cash or in-kind assistance."

== Possible solutions ==
=== The role of labour market policy and institutions ===
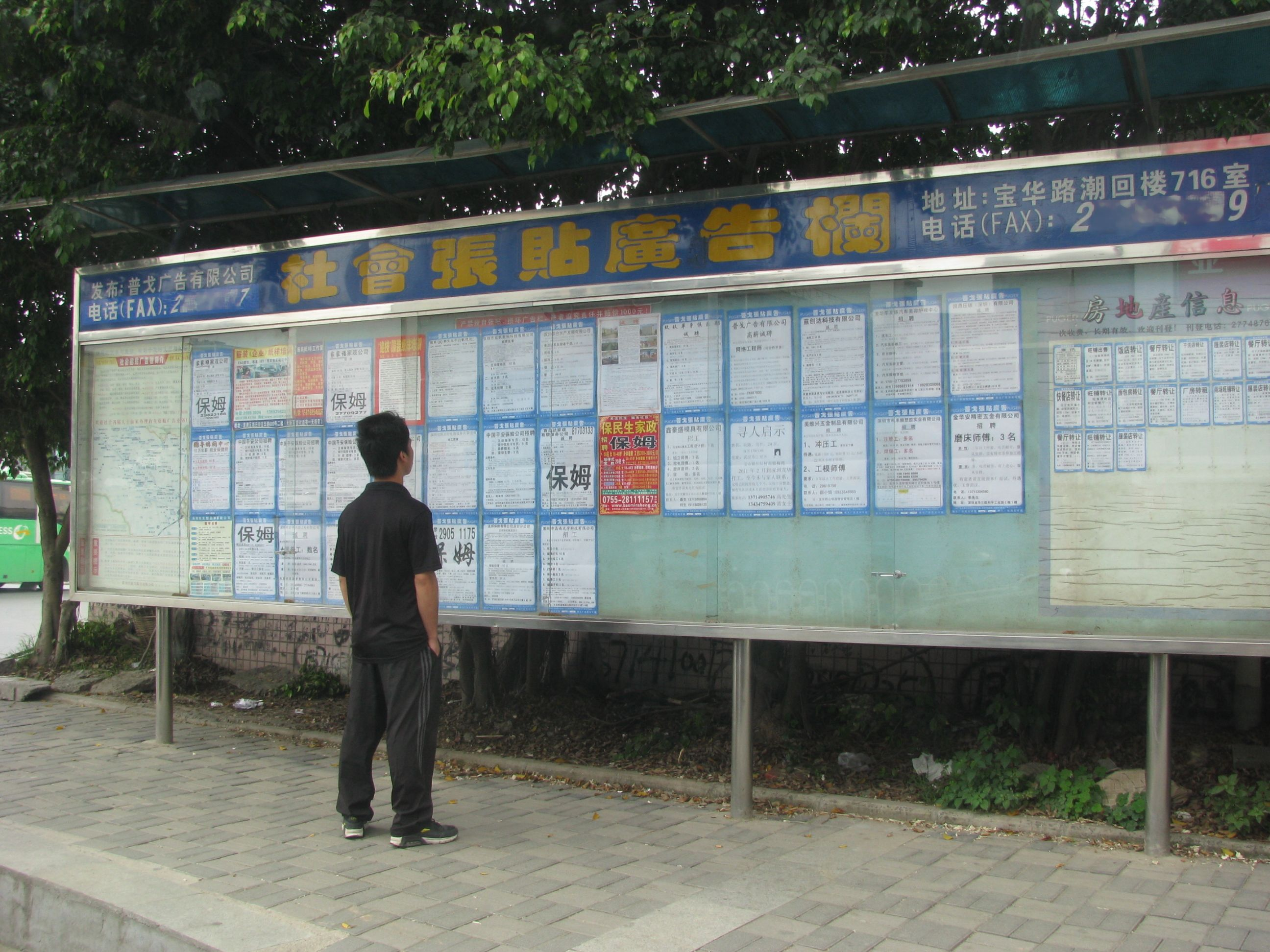
Job advertisement board in Shenzhen

The role of labour market policy and institutions varies a lot from countries to countries. Here is a brief account of key propositions recently elaborated to facilitate access to employment for youth. First, a more balanced employment protection for permanent and temporary workers is needed. It will ensure that young people who lack work experience can prove their abilities and skills to then progressively transition to regular employment. It will also encourage a more equal treatment between permanent and temporary workers and help combat informal employment. This proposition has led to multiple discussions on flexible contracts to be designed and offered to youth. Second, discussions are focused on the level and spread of income support provided to unemployed youth. While some countries consider shifting their support from direct financial assistance to funding apprenticeship, others are increasing their support tying it back to stricter obligations of active search and training. Third, Governments are progressively involving employers and trainers to create a holistic approach to youth unemployment and provide intensive programmes with focus on remedial education, work experience and adult mentoring.

One Active Labour Market Policy (ALMP) that many governments have put emphasis on in an attempt to tackle unemployment is to directly help unemployed individuals transition to self-employment. Various pan-European studies have shown great success of these programmes with regards to job creation and overall well-being.

=== TVET and vocational education ===
TVET as a proportion of all upper secondary programmes

The case has been made the past few years on the need to provide technical training to youth to prepare them specifically for a job. TVET and Vocational education would help address the skills crisis. Some countries – among them Switzerland, The Netherlands, Singapore, Austria, Norway and Germany – have been remarkably successful in developing vocational education – and have reduced youth unemployment to as little as half the OECD average.

Three main reasons are usually presented for why vocational education should be a part of political programmes to combat youth unemployment:

- First, case studies show that strong vocational training programmes reduce unemployment and increase wages. A range of country studies has consistently demonstrated a link between completion of vocational education and a reduced probability of unemployment and higher earnings. In countries where enrolment in in-company vocational education is less than 15%, the likelihood that young people will be unemployed is double that of countries where enrolment is over 15%.
- Second, vocational education increases employers' productivity. A range of studies across countries has found that higher investment in vocational training is associated with increases in productivity.
- Third, vocational education has significant social benefits: vocational education has been linked in studies to improved income equality, greater social inclusion, lower crime rates, and improved health and well-being. To the extent that vocational education reduces unemployment, it also brings the broader social benefits associated with high employment.

Foundational skills have also been identified as key to a successful transition to work. "Across OECD countries, PISA results indicate that almost one in five students do not reach a basic minimum level of skills to function in today's societies". On average, 20% of young adults drop out before completing upper secondary education level. Vocational education aims at teaching foundational skills, as well as providing another option to general education pathways with practical job training.

Many countries around the world offer programmes to improve youth skills and employability. Once of them is Turkey, which focused training students with skills that would help them in running one's own business, as well as entrepreneurship. The United Kingdom and Australia have tried to modernize apprenticeships. Indeed, these are used to provide training for youths in non-traditional occupations. Measures for youth and employment have focused on easing transitions from school or training to work and jobs, as for instance careers information, advice and guidance services.

=== Teaching 21st-century skills ===
The education system plays a central role in the debate about the youth labour market crisis. What has become evident is that there need to be major changes in what we teach and in the way we teach. One prominent approach taken by various educators is to shift teaching from knowledge-centred teaching to skills-centred teaching. "In order to materialize the shift from exclusively content-based to a balanced content-and-skill-based curricula, education providers should make it their goal to establish a guiding skills framework which allows teachers and professors to see the types of skills and applied content they should be transmitting to their students. All educational institutions should work towards adopting or creating a suitable skills framework that aligns with the labour market, which is flexible enough for educators to adapt their subject or grade level. Moreover, this framework should act as a living document that schools and universities can modify to fit their communities or to accommodate changes in the market."

=== Entrepreneurship ===
When taking into consideration the need to foster competitiveness through innovation and creativity, recent studies have advocated for entrepreneurship as a viable solution to youth unemployment. With the right structure and facilitated administrative processes, young people could create enterprises as means to find and create new jobs. According to the OECD, Small and Medium Enterprises are today's main employers with 33% of jobs created over the last ten years. It shows that big companies no longer represent the main sources of employment and that there is a necessity to prepare young people for an entrepreneurship culture. This alternative is often regarded as a way to empower young people to take their future into their hands: it means investing in teaching them the leadership and management skills they need to become innovators and entrepreneurs. These skills also include: communication, teamwork, decision-making, organisational skills and self-confidence.

This solution ties back with labour market and regulations as many reforms are yet to be implemented to ensure that the market is flexible enough to incentivize young people to create enterprises. Target tax and business incentives are key to support young entrepreneurs in creating and scaling their businesses.

A systematic review assessed the evidence on the effectiveness of different types of interventions to improve labour market outcomes of youth. The evidence suggests that youth employment interventions overall increase employment and earnings, but effects are small and highly variable. This review found that interventions geared toward entrepreneurship promotion and skills training show mostly positive, and some statistically significant, effects, while programmes providing employment services and subsidized employment show negligible effects. Effectiveness also seems to depend on contextual aspects including country, programme design, and characteristics of recipients.

=== Social Entrepreneurship ===
Social enterprises are businesses that generate revenue for a social mission. A lot of social enterprises are nonprofit organizations but some can be for-profit businesses. Generally, social enterprises do not generate as much revenue or profit as commercial businesses due to their differences in operations, strategy, and goals. While commercial enterprises are set up to thrive in markets, some markets undervalue social impact and public good so social enterprises, which are mission (and not solely profit) driven, may be more impactful in tackling youth unemployment among racial minorities. Some social enterprises provide employment opportunities to unemployed youth as well as training, career development, and networking opportunities.

=== Assistance to youth in the transition to the world of work ===
A number of studies have shown that young people are not sufficiently advised on work-related opportunities, necessary skills and career pathways. Before they leave education, it appears critical that they have access to this information to be better prepared for what to expect and what is expected of them. Good quality career guidance along with labour market prospects should help young people make better career choices. Some young people choose to study a field that results in few opportunities for future jobs. Governments, employers and trainers should work together to provide clearer pathways to youth. Similarly, programmes should be developed to better transition young people to the world of work. Here, vocational education and apprenticeship systems have shown that practice and on-the-job training can have a positive effect.

== Statistics ==
Country	Youth unemployment rate 2024 ages 15–24		
Country	Total	Female	Male
Australia	9.4	8.1	10.6
Austria	10.2	10.0	10.4
Belgium	17.3	14.6	19.6
Bulgaria	12.1	11.5	12.7
Canada	13.0	11.7	14.3
Chile	20.7	23.3	18.6
Colombia	20.2	25.2	16.6
Costa Rica	21.2	23.9	19.6
Croatia	18.5	18.2	15.9
Czechia	9.6	10.4	8.8
Denmark	14.6		
Estonia	19.3	19.7	19.0
Finland	18.6	17.7	19.5
France	18.6	18.3	18.9
Germany	6.5	5.9	7.1
Greece	22.4	23.9	20.9
Hungary	15.4	15.0	15.7
Iceland	8.5	8.8	8.3
Ireland	10.6	10.2	10.8
Israel	4.6	4.6	4.7
Italy	20.3	22.3	19.2
Japan	4.0	3.7	4.1
South Korea	6.4	6.6	6.1
Latvia	13.6	14.2	13.0
Lithuania	16.0	16.3	15.4
Luxembourg	21.7	18.9	24.1
Mexico	5.8	6.4	5.5
Netherlands	8.7	8.5	8.8
New Zealand	14.0	13.6	14.4
Norway	12.0	11.4	12.6
Poland	10.8	10.9	10.8
Portugal	21.8	22.4	21.2
Romania	23.8	24.9	23.2
Slovakia	19.2	18.9	19.4
Slovenia	10.8	11.0	10.8
Spain	26.5	27.0	26.1
Sweden	24.0	23.3	24.7
Switzerland	8.2	8.5	8.0
Turkey	16.3	22.3	13.1
United Kingdom	14.0	11.7	16.2
United States	8.9	8.1	9.7

== See also ==
- Ageism
- Disengagement from education
- Job guarantee
- Youth intervention
- Youth unemployment in South Korea
- Youth in Iran
- Youth in India
