= Youth in Iran =

The youth of Iran constitute a significant portion of the country's population, with approximately 22% of citizens aged 15 to 29. They are shaping and being shaped by the country's upheavals on every front. Iranian youth have achieved high levels of educational attainment, but face challenges including unemployment, underemployment, and limited access to labour market opportunities, particularly for young women. Iranian youth have been active participants in social and political movements, reflecting aspirations for greater economic opportunity, political participation, and social reform.

== Demographics ==
Iran has a relatively young population. Approximately 22% of Iran's population is between the ages of 15 and 29, while about 25% are under 15. With nearly half the population under 29, Iran's future belongs to its young — whether the government wants it to or not.

== Education ==
Iran has achieved substantial gains in educational attainment among its youth over the past years. Enrolment rates in primary and secondary education exceed 90%, and youth literacy rates have risen sharply since the 1970s, reflecting long‑term government investment in basic education and broad access to schooling. Significant progress has also been made in expanding access to higher education across both public and private sectors, with millions of students enrolled in universities nationwide.

Although Iran's higher education system has produced a growing number of graduates, but the labour market has not expanded at a matching pace to absorb these degree holders, creating a structural mismatch between educational outputs and available jobs. Analysts describe this as partly a result of "blind growth" in universities, where expansion in student numbers has outpaced the creation of suitable employment opportunities.

Official figures from the Statistical Centre of Iran indicate that the unemployment rate among university graduates remains above the national average, and graduates often constitute a large share of the unemployed population. Official data indicate that more than 40% of unemployed persons in Iran hold university degrees. In 2024–25, approximately 10-11%.

== Labour and Employment ==
Youth unemployment in Iran remains substantially higher than the national average.

- According to labour force surveys published in 2025, unemployment among youth aged 15–24 stood at approximately 20.1% in urban areas and 15.9% in rural areas. This compares with a national unemployment rate of about 7.5%. International datasets estimate Iran's youth unemployment rate (ages 15–24) at around 22-23% in 2024, well above the global average.

=== NEET (Not in Education, Employment, or Training) ===
Iran has a substantial proportion of youth classified as NEET. According to recent international data (World Bank/ILO), approximately 25-26 % of Iranian youth aged 15–29 are neither employed nor enrolled in education or training programs. While earlier studies suggested higher rates of up to 38%, current standardized estimates place the NEET share closer to one quarter of the youth population.

=== Gender Disparities ===
Young women in Iran face a starkly different set of prospects than their male peers. Young women experience significantly lower labour force participation rates and higher unemployment than young men. Social norms, legal constraints, and limited access to certain sectors contribute to persistent disparities in economic participation. Data from 2025 show that the unemployment rate for women aged 20–24 approached about 35%, significantly higher than the overall youth rate and far above rates for young men, highlighting the disproportionate impact of labor market challenges on young female job seekers.

== Social and Political Participation ==
Iranian youth have played a prominent role in social and political movements. Students and young adults were central participants in nationwide protests during 2022–2023, reflecting broader demands for political reform, economic opportunity, and social freedoms.

These demonstrations were sparked by the death of Mahsa Amini, a 22‑year‑old woman who died in the custody of Iran's morality police, and quickly evolved into unrest within students, young adults, and other citizens demanding accountability, greater freedoms, and systemic change.

Young Iranians used both street demonstrations and online mobilization to express their demands. Protesters, especially women and girls, challenged compulsory dress codes through public acts of civil disobedience, including appearing in public without mandatory hijab and participating in symbolic protests that spread widely on social media. grassroots groups and networks such as the Neighbourhood Youth Alliance of Iran formed during late 2022, organizing rallies and advocating for broader political change.

In late December 2025, a new wave of nationwide protests involving young Iranians emerged, triggered by a sharp economic downturn, including the plunging value of the Iranian rial and soaring inflation, which sharply increased the cost of living and economic hardship for many citizens. The demonstrations expanded to include university students and youth across Iran, with rallies reported at multiple campuses in Tehran, Isfahan, Yazd, and Zanjan, and chants calling for broader political change, including anti-government and anti-regime slogans beyond purely economic demands.

In the midst of the 2026 unrest in Iran, marked by nationwide anti-government protests, students in Iran began the year with protests in several universities. Ceremonies were held in memory of the thousands killed during the protests and a video referring to Supreme leader Ali Khamenei as a "murderous leader" followed by calls for the rise of exiled prince, Reza Pahlavi.

== Out-migration ==
Iran is losing a generation — one diploma at a time. Rising numbers of Iranian students pursue education abroad, and many skilled young professionals seek employment overseas, contributing to concerns about long-term human capital loss. According to international estimates, over 110,000 Iranian students are currently studying overseas, and more than 70% of them reportedly do not intend to return after graduation.

== See also ==
- Youth in India
- Youth in Nigeria
- List of universities in Iran
- Youth unemployment
- 2025–2026 Iranian protests
