= Robert A. Pollak =

American economist

Robert A. Pollak (born 1 December 1938) is an economist. Pollak has made contributions to the specification and estimation of consumer demand systems, social choice theory, the theory of the cost of living index, and since the early 1980s, to the economics of the family and to demography. He is currently the Hernreich Distinguished Professor of Economics at Washington University in St. Louis, holding joint appointments in the Faculty of Arts & Sciences and in the Olin Business School.

== Early life and education ==
Pollak was born in New York City. He graduated from Amherst College with a BA in history in 1960. He received his PhD in economics from MIT in 1964.
Pollak is married to Vivian Pollak, a professor emerita of English at Washington University in St. Louis who writes on American poetry. They have two sons.

== Career ==
Pollak began his career as an assistant professor of economics at the University of Pennsylvania in 1964. He spent the academic year 1968–1969 on leave from the University of Pennsylvania working as an economist at the US Bureau of Labor Statistics in Washington DC. Pollak was promoted to associate professor in 1968 and to professor in 1972. In 1983 he was named the Charles and William Day Professor of Economics and Social Sciences, a position he held until 1990.

In 1985 Pollak joined the faculty of the University of Washington, Seattle, as a visiting professor of economics. After resigning from the University of Pennsylvania in 1990, he became a professor of economics at the University of Washington.

In 1995 Pollak joined the faculty of Washington University in St. Louis as the Hernreich Distinguished Professor of Economics, holding joint appointments in the Faculty of Arts & Sciences and the Olin Business School.

Pollak served as co-chair of the MacArthur Foundation Network on the Family and the Economy, an interdisciplinary network funded by the MacArthur Foundation, from 1997 to 2005. This interdisciplinary network explored issues related to marriage, divorce, and family members' use of time and income, focusing on their implications for educational and other outcomes for children.

== Research ==
The scope of Pollak's work has been unusually broad, but increasingly since the early 1980s his work has focused on the economics of the family and on demography.

Pollak's early work was on the consistency of individual and collective decisions over time and led to widely cited publications, including a joint article with Nobel laureate Edmund Phelps.

A major focus of Pollak's early work was the theory of consumer demand, eventually leading to empirical research and to a book on demand system specification and estimation with Terence J. Wales.

Another major focus of Pollak's early work was on the theory of the cost of living index which provides the theoretical basis for the Consumer Price Index, the primary measure of inflation. Pollak's articles reporting this work are collected in a book, The Theory of the Cost of Living Index published by Oxford University Press in 1989.

Another focus of Pollak's work is the problem of combining individuals' preferences into a single consistent preference ranking, a field economists call "social choice theory". This led to a series of articles with Douglas H. Blair.

Increasingly since the early 1980s the focus of Pollak's work shifted to the economics of the family, especially issues related to parents and children. This resulted in a series of papers with Jere Behrman and the late Paul Taubman which are included in a book published by the University of Chicago Press in 1995.

Pollak's move to the University of Washington in 1985 marked the beginning of his long and fruitful collaboration with Shelly Lundberg on bargaining in marriage and other family issues. The "separate spheres bargaining model", developed in their most widely cited article, provides a game theoretic analysis of bargaining in marriage. A closely related empirical paper (joint with Shelly Lundberg and Terence J. Wales) finds strong evidence that the fraction of household resources controlled by each spouse is an important determinant of allocation within marriage. Pollak's work with Liliana Pezzin and Barbara Schone applies related ideas to adult children's provision of long-term care for their disabled elderly parents. In a 2019 article, Pollak examines the implications of bargaining models of marriage for the marriage market (i.e., who marries and who marries whom).

Pollak's early work in demography solved what demographers call the "two sex problem"—how to include males in the standard demographic model of fertility which ignores them. His solution to the two-sex problem led the Population Association of America to give him the Mindel Sheps Award for contributions to mathematical demography in 2000. Pollak's subsequent work in demography included a study of educational outcomes for children in blended families (joint with Donna Ginther.) and studies of the migration of individuals and married couples with Janice Compton.

== Honors and awards ==
- Distinguished Fellow, American Economic Association, 2017
- Mindel Sheps Award, Population Association of America, 2000
- John Simon Guggenheim Foundation Fellowship, 1999-2000
- National Bureau of Economic Research, Research Associate
- Institute for Labor Economics (IZA) (fellow since 2006)
- American Academy of Arts and Sciences (fellow since 1999)
- American Association for the Advancement of Science (fellow since 1991)
- Econometric Society (fellow since 1977)
- Editor, International Economic Review, 1976-1985
- Co-chair, MacArthur Foundation Network on the Family and the Economy, 1997-2007
- Member, Board of the Committee on the Status of Women in the Economics Profession (CSWEP) of the American Economic Association, 2000-2003
- Member, National Academies Standing Committee on Research and Evidentiary Standards, 2007-2012
- President of The Society of Labor Economists (SOLE), 2009-2010
- Pollak has served on various National Academy of Sciences committees, including the Panel on Cost-of-Living Indexes.
- Pollak has been awarded 30 research grants, including 12 from the National Science Foundation (Principal Investigator on 11) and 8 from the National Institutes of Health (Principal Investigator on 5), and grants from the Rockefeller Foundation and the John D. and Catherine T. MacArthur Foundation.

== Selected publications ==
Pollak has authored or co-authored three books:

- Pollak, Robert A., The Theory of the Cost of Living Index, New York: Oxford University Press, 1989.
- Pollak, Robert A., and Terence J. Wales, Demand System Specification and Estimation, New York: Oxford University Press, 1992.
- Behrman, Jere R., Robert A. Pollak, and Paul Taubman, From Parent to Child: Intrahousehold Allocations and Intergenerational Relations in the United States, Chicago: University of Chicago Press, 1995.

Pollak has written more than 100 academic papers; 14 have received more than 500 Google citations, 6 of these have received more than 1000 Google citations, and 3 have received more than 2000 Google citations. The following are Pollak's papers that have received more than 500 Google citations, beginning with the most frequently cited papers.

- Lundberg, Shelly and Robert A. Pollak, "Separate Spheres Bargaining and the Marriage Market," Journal of Political Economy, Vol. 101, No. 6, (December 1993), 988–1010.
- Lundberg, Shelly, Robert A. Pollak, and Terence J. Wales, "Do Husbands and Wives Pool Their Resources? Evidence from the United Kingdom Child Benefit," Journal of Human Resources, Vol. 32, No. 3 (Summer 1997), 463–480.
- Phelps, Edmund S., and Robert A. Pollak, "On Second-Best National Saving and Game Equilibrium Growth," Review of Economic Studies, Vol. 35, No. 2, (April 1968), 185–199.
- Lundberg, Shelly and Robert A. Pollak, "Bargaining and Distribution in Marriage," Journal of Economic Perspectives, Vol. 10, No. 4, (Fall 1996), 139–158.
- Pollak, Robert A., "A Transaction Cost Approach to Families and Households," Journal of Economic Literature, Vol. 23, No. 2 (June 1985), 581–608.
- Pollak, Robert A., "Habit Formation and Dynamic Demand Functions," Journal of Political Economy, Vol. 78, No. 4, (July–August 1970), 745–763.
- Pollak, Robert A., and Michael L. Wachter, "The Relevance of the Household Production Function and Its Implications for the Allocation of Time," The Journal of Political Economy, Vol. 83, No. 2, (April 1975), 255–277.
- Pollak, Robert A., and Terence J. Wales, "Demographic Variables in Demand Analysis," Econometrica, Vol. 49, No. 6, (November 1981), 1533–1551.
- Behrman, Jere R., Robert A. Pollak and Paul J. Taubman, "Parental Preferences and Provision for Progeny," Journal of Political Economy, Vol. 90, No. l, (February 1982), 52–73.
- Pollak, Robert A., "Consistent Planning," Review of Economic Studies, Vol. 35, No. 2 (April 1968), 20l-208.
- Lundberg, Shelly and Robert A. Pollak, "Noncooperative Bargaining Models of Marriage," American Economic Review, Vol. 84, No. 2, (May 1994), 132–137
- Pollak, Robert A. and Terence J. Wales, "Welfare Comparisons and Equivalence Scales," American Economic Review, Vol. 69, No. 2, (May 1979), 2l6-22l.
- Pollak, Robert A., "Interdependent Preferences," American Economic Review, Vol. 66, No. 3, (June 1976), 309–320.
- Ginther, Donna K. and Robert A. Pollak, "Family Structure and Children's Educational Outcomes: Blended Families, Stylized Facts, and Descriptive Regressions," Demography, Vol. 41, No. 4, (November 2004), 671–696.
