= Youth unemployment in South Korea =

Overview article

The rate of youth unemployment in South Korea fluctuated in the 9–11% range between 2001 and 2014. It was above 10% in 2018 and down to 7.1% by the end of 2019 - the lowest level since 2011.

== Overall youth unemployment rate in South Korea ==
According to OECD, the youth unemployment rate (total % of youth labor force aged 15–24 year old) in Republic of Korea(ROK) is as follows: 10.2% in 2001, 8.5% in 2002, 10.05% in 2003, 10.43% in 2004, 10.15% in 2005, 9.95% in 2006, 8.79% in 2007, 9.27% in 2008, 9.84% in 2009, 9.77% in 2010, 9.61% in 2011, 8.99% in 2010, 9.34% in 2013, 10.03% in 2014, 10.52% in 2015, 10.68% in 2016 and 7.10% in 2019. More specifically, the total youth unemployment rate between ages 15 and 29 rose from 7.9% in 2001 to 9.8% in 2016, whilst rising from 6.1% to 9.2% amongst 25-29 year olds. It has been decreasing since then until a low of 7.1% in 2019. In terms of youth inactivity, 7.7% are looking for jobs or attending job training programs while 3.1% are purely inactive, not working, having education nor attending job training programs.

OECD Youth Unemployment Rate (15–24 year olds) from 2001 to 2016

== NEET ==
One of the youth unemployment issues in South Korea is youth inactiveness, where there are growing numbers of inactive youth, defined as the NEET(Not in Education Employment or Training). The youth in South Korea prefer high education to increase and develop their employability in the labor market rather than seeking jobs, which leads them to become inactive. The reaffirming factors that reduce the chance of employment include: socioeconomic status, household characteristics, and family income. Since 2009, the size of youth NEET is about 20%, higher than the OECD average. Although the proportion of NEET non-job seekers decreased, job seekers of NEET increased. Since 2015, the NEET unemployed remained high, overtaking NEET inactive. These youth NEET are categorizable into income groups, where the highest was low income household, and the lowest was the high income household. The NEET rate of low income youth is 37.7% in 2014, while that of high income is only 9.5% in 2014.

== Structural causes of unemployment ==
=== Education ===
Over the past two decades, the number of students enrolled in tertiary education has quadrupled. As of 2007, 80% of college graduates were job seekers while only 30% of jobs demand highly educated workers. With the recent overabundance of high school and college graduates, the requirements of the labor market mismatch the skills provided by the education system. Poor school-business networks, insufficient employment service infrastructure, and asymmetric labor market information also result in limited possibilities for combining study and work.

==== Suneung ====
Suneung, also known as the CSAT (College Scholastic Ability Test), is a series of tests taken for eight hours in one day. The test is usually taken by students in their senior year of high school, which some students call "the year of hell". South Korean households hold education as a priority in their cultural value, believing good education will lead their children to successful careers and lives. Suneung is held every year in November, and the test is said to determine which university a student will attend, as well as future employment and wages. Korean students vie for entry to Seoul National University, Korea University, and Yonsei University, collectively known as "SKY," because those institutions are known to support the connections needed to be employed in government or family-owned conglomerates (chaebols) that come with employee benefits.

To prepare for the Suneung, South Korean parents invest thousands of dollars in tutoring and private education for years of their children's education. South Korea has about 100,000 hagwons (cram/private schools) and in 2017, over 80% of all Korean students attended cram schools. In 2010, around 75% of students attended private education; families spend roughly US$217 a month for years in elementary school, middle school, and high school. The private education industry in Korea is estimated to be worth around US$20 billion. Due to high costs, parents have decided to have less children in order to invest quality education for them.

Though families emphasize a great deal for the education, the employment in South Korea's job market from Korea's conglomerates are not guaranteed. In 2016, around 3.34 million degree holders in South Korea had delayed entering the job market in order to seek higher education or find other full-time employment opportunities. According to the OECD, South Korea ranks the highest in population between the ages of 25 and 34 years old with tertiary education out of all OECD countries. As a result of investment in private education to test well in Su-neung, domestic consumption has dropped for the middle class in Korea, causing a strain in the economy.

==== Mental health and fertility issues ====
In South Korea, the number one cause of death for youth between the ages of 10 and 30 years old is suicide. South Korea ranked the highest in suicide rates out all OECD nations, along with the highest stress levels for youth between the ages of 11 and 15 years old. South Korea spent around 7.3% of its GDP on health expenditures in 2016, but as of 2014, only 2.6% of those health expenditures (US$43 million) was for the mental health budget.

In part due to high suicide rates and unease about expensive education, South Korea's population has the lowest fertility rate out of all OECD countries. Low fertility and an aging population are predicted to reduce tax revenue in the future, which would burden South Korea's welfare system and universal healthcare. Poor welfare could then lead to worsening of the mental illness issue and other social issues. Should the issue remain unaddressed, high costs of education and low fertility will further decrease South Korean domestic consumption, which will lead to slower economic growth.

=== Segmented groups ===
The cause of unemployment is different for each segmented group. High school graduate and college dropouts have a higher rate of job separation than college graduates. High job separation is due to the mismatch between jobs and workers, where workers cannot attain jobs they prefer. There is also a low performance for temporary employees and seasonal workers.

=== Other structural problems ===
Employment regulations deter youths moving from non-regular employment to regular employment, worsening labor market duality. Non-unemployed youth, especially those with lower education, do not receive assistance for job seeking. Labor market rigidities including inflexible wages, high non-wage costs and employment protection also cause youth unemployment. High employment protection, combined with low standardization of the education system, satisfies a condition for high NEET rate. Additionally, the public sector's investment in regional vocational training is weak, and the private sector, including large enterprises, marginally invests in vocational training.

=== Economic downturns ===
South Korea's economic downturns and reduced international competitiveness also cause youth unemployment. Due to the slowing economic growth rate of 3% since 2003, and the coefficient of employment (number of employed workers per every one billion won of GDP) dropping by half of the level of 1990 by 2005, the employment absorptive capacity of the labor market reduced drastically., which makes it difficult for college graduates to find jobs. When demand collapses as in times of economic slumps, the young are the first to be dismissed from companies since they have no work experience. Youth are also disadvantaged in entering the labor market as they compete with older employees with job experience, which makes graduates vulnerable to macroeconomic cyclical depressions, leading to high youth unemployment as well as higher precariousness in transitioning from school to work.

== Policy efforts to mitigate youth unemployment issues ==
=== History ===
Policy efforts to tackle youth unemployment produced a result of increased inactiveness and capped unemployment. From 2004 to 2006, government measures tackled 20% of total unemployment issues, focusing on unemployment of college students and graduates. Implementation was left to the colleges themselves, which made it hard for college students to approach the system voluntarily.

Employment Promotion Plan for High School Graduates or Below, in 2006, provided support services to guide job seeking in order to facilitate school to work transition. Also, it supported for vocational high school students, school dropouts and fostering of manual workers.

=== Recent trends in policy ===
The recent trends are leaning toward the corporatist policy approach in lieu of the past market driven policy approach. The corporatist approach includes: working hour reduction, public sector jobs reduction, quality improvement in small firm jobs, and expansion of public sector employment. Policy efforts only accounted for .13% of South Korea's GDP, ranking it the second to the lowest among OECD countries in 2006.

The newly elected president in 2017, Moon Jae-In, won the election in part by promising to reduce youth unemployment. He has claimed to put top priority to expand the public sector for job creation, saying that he would create 810,000 jobs in the public sector. Moon's administration promised to create 174,000 civil service positions in national security and public safety, 340,000 in social services and convert 300,000 irregular workers to fully employed workers. Also, the government increased minimum wages by 16.4% at 7,530 won per-hour, aiming it to become W10,000 by 2020.

Moon Jae-In's administration labor policy had a positive influence in decreasing youth unemployment. As of 2019, the youth unemployment rate was as its lowest level since the late 1990s.
