= Economic restructuring =

Changes in the constituent parts of an economy in a very general sense

Economic restructuring is used to indicate changes in the constituent parts of an economy in a very general sense. In the western world, it is usually used to refer to the phenomenon of urban areas shifting from a manufacturing to a service sector economic base. It has profound implications for productive capacities and competitiveness of cities and regions. This transformation has affected demographics including income distribution, employment, and social hierarchy; institutional arrangements including the growth of the corporate complex, specialized producer services, capital mobility, informal economy, nonstandard work, and public outlays; as well as geographic spacing including the rise of world cities, spatial mismatch, and metropolitan growth differentials.

== Demographic impact ==
As cities experience a loss of manufacturing jobs and growth of services, sociologist Saskia Sassen affirms that a widening of the social hierarchy occurs where high-level, high-income, salaried professional jobs expand in the service industries alongside a greater incidence of low-wage, low-skilled jobs, usually filled by immigrants and minorities. A "missing middle" eventually develops in the wage structure. Several effects of this social polarization include the increasing concentration of poverty in large U.S. cities, the increasing concentration of black and Hispanic populations in large U.S. cities, and distinct social forms such as the underclass, informal economy, and entrepreneurial immigrant communities. In addition, the declining manufacturing sector leaves behind strained blue-collar workers who endure chronic unemployment, economic insecurity, and stagnation due to the global economy's capital flight. Wages and unionization rates for manufacturing jobs also decline. One other qualitative dimension involves the feminization of the job supply as more and more women enter the labor force usually in the service sector.

Both costs and benefits are associated with economic restructuring. Greater efficiency, job creation, gentrification, and enhanced national competitiveness are associated with social exclusion and inclusion. The low-skilled, low-income population faces the loss of opportunities, full participation in society, lack of access in labor market and school, weak position in housing markets, limited political participation, and restricted social-cultural integration. Conversely, high-skilled, high-income professionals enjoy social inclusion with modern amenities, conveniences, social participation, and full access to public resources.

Furthermore, sociologist William Julius Wilson argues that the deindustrialization of manufacturing employment has exacerbated joblessness in impoverished African American communities correlating with a rise in single-mother households, high premature mortality rates, and increasing incarceration rates among African American males. With some African Americans gaining professional upward mobility through affirmative action and equal opportunity sanctions in education and employment, African Americans without such opportunities fall behind. This creates a growing economic class division among the African American demographic accentuated by global economic restructuring without government response to the disadvantaged. Furthermore, Wilson asserts that as the black middle class leave the predominantly black inner city neighborhoods, informal employment information networks are eroded. This isolates poor, inner city residents from the labor market compounding the concentration of poverty, welfare dependency, rise of unemployment, and physical isolation in these areas.

City youth are also affected such as in New York City. The declines in education, health care, and social services and the dearth of jobs for those with limited education and training along with the decay of public environments for outdoor play and recreation have all contributed to fewer autonomous outdoor play or "hanging out" places for young people. This in turn affects their gross motor development, cultural build-up, and identity construction. Children become prisoners of home relying on television and other outlets for companionship. Contemporary urban environments restrict the opportunities for children to forge and negotiate peer culture or acquire necessary social skills. Overall, their ecologies have eroded in recent years brought about by global restructuring.

== Institutional arrangements ==
When the 1973 oil crisis affected the world capitalist economy, economic restructuring was used to remedy the situation by geographically redistributing production, consumption, and residences. City economies across the globe moved from goods-producing to service-producing outlets. Breakthroughs in transportation and communications made industrial capital much more mobile. Soon, producer services emerged as a fourth basic economic sector where routine low-wage service employment moved to low-cost sites and advanced corporate services centralized in cities. These technological upheavals brought about changes in institutional arrangements with the prominence of large corporations, allied business and financial services, nonprofit and public sector enterprises. Global cities such as New York and London become centers for international finance and headquarters for multinational corporations offering cross currency exchange services as well as buildup of foreign banking and trading. Other cities become regional headquarters centers of low-wage manufacturing. In all these urban areas the corporate complex grows offering banking, insurance, advertising, legal counsel, and other service functions. Economic restructuring allows markets to expand in size and capacity from regional to national to international scopes.

Altogether, these institutional arrangements buttressed by improved technology reflect the interconnectedness and internationalization of firms and economic processes. Consequently, capital, goods, and people rapidly flow across borders. Where the mode of regulation began with Fordism and Taylorization in the industrial age then to mass consumption of Keynesian economics policies, it evolves to differentiated and specialized consumption through international competition. Additionally, in the labor market, nonstandard work arrangements develop in the form of part-time work, temporary agency and contract company employment, short-term employment, contingent work, and independent contracting. Global economic changes and technological improvements in communications and information systems encouraged competitive organizations to specialize in production easily and assemble temporary workers quickly for specific projects. Thus, the norm of standard, steady employment unravels beginning in the mid-1970s.

Another shift in institutional arrangement involves public resources. As economic restructuring encourages high-technology service and knowledge-based economies, massive public de-investment results. Across many parts of the U.S. and the industrialized Western nations, steep declines in public outlays occur in housing, schools, social welfare, education, job training, job creation, child care, recreation, and open space. To remedy these cutbacks, privatization is installed as a suitable measure. Though it leads to some improvements in service production, privatization leads to less public accountability and greater unevenness in the distribution of resources. With this reform in privatizing public services, neoliberalism has become the ideological platform of economic restructuring. Free market economic theory has dismantled Keynesian and collectivist strategies and promoted the Reagan and Thatcher politics of the 1980s. Soon free trade, flexible labor, and capital flight are used from Washington D.C. to London to Moscow. Moreover, economic restructuring requires decentralization as states hand down power to local governments. Where the federal government focuses on mainly warfare-welfare concerns, local governments focus on productivity. Urban policy reflects this market-oriented shift from once supporting government functions to now endorsing businesses.

== Geographic impact ==
Urban landscapes especially in the U.S. have significantly altered in response to economic restructuring. Cities such as Baltimore, Detroit, St. Louis and others face population losses which result in thousands of abandoned homes, unused buildings, and vacant lots, contributing to urban decay. Such transformations frustrate urban planning and revitalization, fostering deviance in the forms of drug-related activity and vagrancy. Older, compact, industrial U.S. cities have been rendered obsolete. Urban spaces become playgrounds for the urban gentry, wastelands for low-paid service workers, and denizens for the underground economy. In some areas, gentrification projects have caused displacement of poverty-stricken residents. Sunbelt cities such as Miami and Atlanta rise to become key business centers while Snowbelt cities such as Buffalo and Youngstown decline. Even housing markets respond to economic restructuring with decaying housing stocks, escalating housing prices, depleting tax base, changes in financing, and reduction in federal support for housing. Soon, spatial divisions among wealthy and poor households exacerbate. Moreover, with the movement of blue-collared employment from central cities, geographically entrenched housing discrimination, and suburban land use policy, African American youths in inner cities become victims of spatial mismatch, where their residences provide only weak and negative employment growth and they usually lack access to intrametropolitan mobility. High-order services, an expanding sector in the industrialized world, become spatially concentrated in a relative small number of large metropolitan areas, particularly in suburban office agglomerations.

== Meaning ==
In cultural terms, economic restructuring has been associated with postmodernity as its counterpart concerning flexible accumulation. Additionally, the term carries with it three core themes: historical, radical rupture into post-industrial economic order; priority of economic forces over social/political forces; and structure over agency where the process is independent of human will, as it takes place according to economic logic (Logan & Swanstrom 1990). In addition, economic restructuring demonstrates the increasingly complex and human-capital intensive modern society in Western nations.

== See also ==
- Manufacturing
- Service sector
- Global city
- Spatial mismatch
- Informal economy
- Capital flight
- Gentrification
- Social exclusion
- Upward mobility
- Suburbanization
- Social hierarchy
