= Shelly Lundberg =

Economist

Shelly J. Lundberg is an economist and currently holds the positions of Leonard Broom Professor of Demography at the University of California, Santa Barbara, where she serves as associate director of the Broom Center for Demography. Lundberg is one of the world's leading population economists.

== Biography ==
Shelly Lundberg earned a B.A. from the University of British Columbia in 1975 and a Ph.D. from Northwestern University in 1981, writing her thesis on the relationship between unemployment and household labour supply. After her graduation, Lundberg became an assistant professor of economics at the University of Pennsylvania (1980–84) before moving on to the University of Washington. There, she was promoted first to associate professor of economics (1989–94), then to full professor (1994–2004) and finally was made Castor Professor of Economics in 2004. While at the University of Washington, Lundberg directed the Center for Research on Families (2001–11) as well as the Center for Studies in Demography and Ecology. Since 2011, she has been the Leonard Broom Professor of Demography at the University of California, Santa Barbara (UCSB), where she serves as associate director of the Broom Center for Demography. In parallel, Lundberg has held visiting appointments at the Russell Sage Foundation and Princeton University. She has been a professor (II) of economics at the University of Bergen,

Besides her academic positions, Lundberg is also affiliated with the IZA Institute of Labor Economics, of which she is a research fellow, and the American Economic Association, wherein she chairs the Committee on the Status of Women in the Economics Profession. Her research has been honoured through the award of a national fellowship at the Hoover Institution (1982–83), a Fellowship in the Society of Labor Economists, whose President she was in 2012–13, and a Downing Fellowship. Moreover, Lundberg has served in the past as Chair of the Social Sciences and Population Studies of the National Institutes of Health, as vice-president of the Association of Population Centers, and as member of the Scientific Advisory Board of the German Institute for Economic Research (DIW). Finally, she also performs editorial duties for the Journal of Demographic Economics, IZA World of Labor, and the Review of Economics of the Household, and has done so in the past for the American Economic Review, Journal of Population Economics, Demography, Labour Economics, and the Journal of Human Resources. In 2026, the Society of Labor Economists awarded Lundberg the Jacob Mincer Award for lifetime contributions to labour economics, recognizing her research on household labour supply, family structure, and inequality, as well as her service to the profession.

Shelly Lundberg is married to economist Richard Startz, with whom she has two children.

== Research ==
Shelly Lundberg's research focuses on labour economics, inequality, and the economics of the family. In her research, she has particularly frequently collaborated with Robert A. Pollak. According to IDEAS/RePEc, Lundberg belongs to the top 2% of economists in terms of her research.

=== Research on the labour economics of households ===
One area of Lundberg's research concerns the labour economics of households. In her seminal 1985 paper, Lundberg developed the concept of the added worker effect, which explains countercyclical increases in the labour supply of married women as responses to their husbands' cyclical unemployment.* In further work, Lundberg finds that the labour supply of married couples remains separately determined as long as the couples don't have children of preschool age; thereafter, the working hours of families become highly correlated and display negative cross-earnings effects. Together with Elaina Rose, Lundberg finds that the effects of parenthood on the earnings and hours worked of married men and women strongly vary on the continuity of the mother's attachment to the labour force and on the child's gender: if the wife's employment is interrupted, the fall in the hours worked and wages of the wife is partly offset by an increase in the labour supply and earnings of the husband, whereas in the opposite case fathers' hours worked decrease strongly; moreover, all else equal, fathers tend to increase their labour supply and wages substantially more in case of a son than if they have a daughter, a finding in line with further work by Lundberg on child gender bias.

=== Research on intrahousehold bargaining ===
A second area of Shelly Lundberg's research addresses bargaining within married couples. In a seminal paper with Robert A. Pollak, Lundberg developed the "separate spheres" bargaining model, wherein spouses don't threaten each other with divorce but rather with the adoption of a non-cooperative separate spheres approach to the marriage, with important implications for marriage market and the distributional consequences of transfer policies. Relatedly, Lundberg and Pollak are critical of "common preferences" (unitary) models of households compared to household models that involve intra-household bargaining and emphasize spouses' relative control over resources. In line with this view, Lundberg, Pollak and Terence Wales observe that the reallocation of child benefits to wives in the UK was associated with substantial increases in households' expenditures on women's and children's clothing. Lundberg and Pollak have also challenged the notion that bargaining in marriages generally results in efficiency, arguing that inefficient outcomes may occur if current decisions can be expected to affect future bargaining power. Together with Startz and Steven Stillman, Lundberg has also studied the sudden drop in consumption associated with the retirement of male household heads, which she explains through the shift in control over household income due to retirement and wives' preference to save more because of their relatively higher life expectancies.

=== Research on the economics of teenage pregnancies ===
A third area of Lundberg's research deals with the economics of premarital adolescent fertility. In research with Robert Plotnick, Lundberg observes important differences between the responsiveness of Caucasian and Afro-American adolescents' premarital pregnancies, pregnancy outcomes and prenatal marriages to welfare benefits, abortion laws and family planning policies, with Afro-Americans' behaviour being essentially unaffected by these policy variables. The importance of racial differences in the effects of teenage pregnancies is also reflected by Lundberg and Plotnick's finding (together with Daniel Klepinger) that having a child before age 18 significantly reduces educational attainment only among Afro-Americans, though significant negative effects can also be observed for Caucasians and Hispanics with regard to childbearing before the age of 20. By reducing young women's educational attainment, teenage childbearing also is found by Lundberg, Klepinger and Plotnick to significantly depress young women's wages, offering a further rationale for public policies aimed at reducing teenage pregnancies.

=== Other research in labour economics, population economics and family economics ===
In early work with Startz, Lundberg developed an influential model of statistical discrimination in competitive labour markets wherein social welfare could be maximized by policies prohibiting group-specific discrimination. Together with Rose, Lundberg finds that sons tend to accelerate the transition of women into marriage if the husband is also the son's biological father, though child gender doesn't affect mothers' remarriage probabilities when the children are born within a previous marriage.
