= Added worker effect =

Economic theory

The added worker effect refers to an increase in the labor supply of married women when their husbands become unemployed. Underlying the theory is the assumption that married women are secondary workers with a less permanent attachment to the labor market than their partners. As statistics show, married women do not always behave as secondary workers; therefore, the effect is not a universal phenomenon.

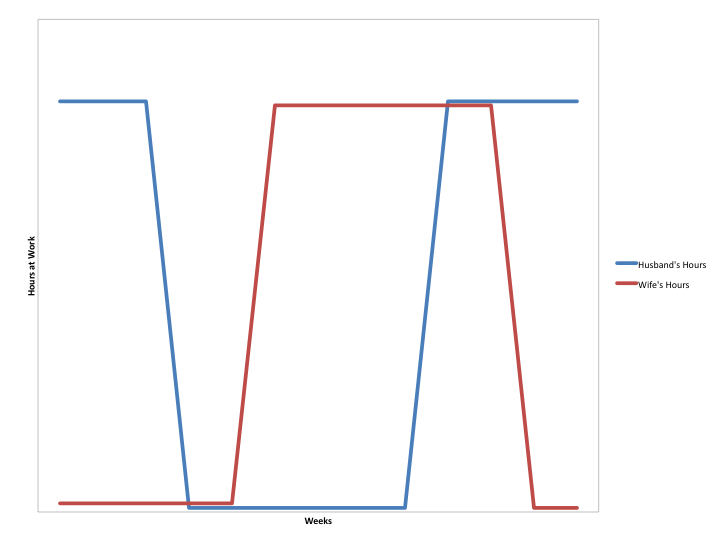
Simple model of the added worker effect after Shelly Lundberg's (1985)

== Origin of idea ==
The concept of “additional workers” appeared in empiric studies on unemployment in the United States during the Great Depression conducted in 1940 by economists Wladimir S. Woytinsky and Don D. Humphrey (Humphrey, 1940, p. 412). Humphrey's study did not find any observable added worker effect, but it did not deny that added workers participated in the market (Humphrey, p. 415). He challenged the validity of Woytinsky's study in the absence of a time series analysis.

== Relation to income and substitution effects ==
In the added worker effect married women are willing to work more for pay as a response to a loss of real income despite the price of leisure dropping in relation to the wage rate.

A common model used to study the added worker effect views the family as a decision making unit and leisure time as a normal good. With this understanding, a married woman may choose to enter the labor market to offset the loss of income her family faces when her husband loses his job. Since family wages are pooled and the price of consuming leisure varies among individuals depending on earning power, an increase in one individual's income may result in other family members gaining leisure time by working less (Mincer, 1962, p. 65). The diminishing marginal utility of income explains why the family would work fewer hours.

Women's earning power, which is typically less than that of their husbands, depends on wage rates and employment opportunities (Mincer, p. 66). While earning power and labor force participation have a positive correlation, an inverse relationship characterizes husbands' income and wives' participation in the labor market. Therefore, women may be less inclined to enter the labor force when earning power rises for both men and women.

The added worker effect results when the income effect dominates the substitution effect in an individual's decision whether or not to participate in the labor market. The income and substitution effects are concepts in the consumer choice theory of microeconomics.

For added workers to enter the labor market when earning power decreases, the negative income effect must outweigh the positive substitution effect (Mincer, p. 68). In families whose male head of household loses his job, “the relative decline in family income is much stronger than the relative decline in the 'expected' wage rate of the wife.” In this case, the net effect leads the wife to enter the labor market, thereby increasing the labor supply. An example of the effect can be found in a study by Arnold Katz, who attributes the bulk of the increase in married female workers in the depression of 1958 “to the distress[ed] job seeking of wives whose husbands were out of work” (1961, p. 478).

== Variables that determine prevalence of added workers ==
=== Recessionary characteristics ===
Multiple variables contribute to the added worker effect. Since increasing labor supplied remains one of many strategies families can use to cope with unemployment, its use depends on the relative price and effectiveness of alternatives (Lundberg, 1985, p. 12). Alternative responses include borrowing, living off savings, selling assets, consumption smoothing, and undertaking a more intensive job search by the husband (Lundberg, p. 12; Serneels, 2002). In recessions, credit constraints become more relevant, making it more likely that the Added Worker Effect will be observed (Lundberg, p. 12).

=== Household characteristics ===
When faced with an unemployed husband, a wife's decision to seek more employment is predicted partly by the level of unemployment benefits available, the duration of the unemployment, general labor market conditions in the surrounding area, her age, and her personal employment experiences in the preceding year (Katz, p. 478). The presence of young children usually hinders the employment of married mothers, Katz found that the added worker effect is more pronounced among young married couples with small children, perhaps due to higher levels of debt (Mattingly & Smith, 2010, p. 346; Maloney, 1991; Katz, p. 478).

== The added worker effect after the Great Recession ==
=== Long-term unemployment's impact on the added worker effect ===
During the Great Recession, which spanned December 2007 to June 2009, the average duration of unemployment reached a record high in the United States, which led to an increased incidence of the added worker effect (Rampell, 2010). The labor force participation rate of the wife rises with the expectation that her husband will be unemployed permanently due to aging or other factors (Maloney, p. 183). Women who expect their husbands will be unemployed for the long-run are more likely to accept a job when they have the opportunity, but without the intention of dropping out implied by the Added Worker Effect.

=== Prevalence of women as primary workers ===
A prolonged period of unemployment can lead to what economists call the discouraged worker effect, where workers drop out of the labor supply. The wives of discouraged workers do not behave as secondary workers, altering their labor supply in response to their spouses' transitory bouts with unemployment, but rather, these wives become breadwinners (Maloney, p. 183). Between 2007 and 2009, the United States saw a large increase in women's contribution to family income, resulting from a decrease in husband's earnings because three out of four eliminated jobs had belonged to men (Mattingly & Smith, p. 344). Working wives also worked more hours if their spouses stopped working (Mattingly & Smith, p. 355).

=== Criteria used to define “entering the workforce” ===
The equations typically used in studies on added worker effect consider a woman active in the workforce whether she is employed or actively seeking a job. Tim Maloney's study found no evidence of the added worker effect when entering the workforce is unorthodoxly defined by gaining employment (1991). This example supports the finding that often women with frequently unemployed spouses look for work but fail to find jobs that would enable them to offset the loss in household income. Such was not the case during the Great Recession, when wives with unemployed husbands commenced work more often than during the preceding period of economic growth (Mattingly & Smith, p. 351).

== Resources ==
- Folbre, N. (2010, October 12). The spousal safety net. New York Times blog.
- Humphrey, D.D. (1940). Alleged "additional workers" in the measurement of unemployment. The Journal of Political Economy, 48(3), 412–419.
- Katz, A. (1961). Cyclical unemployment and the secondary family worker. Presentation to Econometric Society. Abstracted in Econometrica, 29(3), 478. (jstor)
- Lundberg, S. (1985). The Added Worker Effect. Journal of Labor Economics, 3(1), 11–37.
- Maloney, T. (1991). Unobserved variables and the elusive Added Worker Effect. Economica, 58(230), 173–187.
- Mattingly, M., & Smith, K. (2010.). Changes in wives' employment when husbands stop working: a recession-prosperity comparison. Family Relations, 59(4), 343–357.
- Mincer, J. (1962). Labor force participation of married women. Aspects of Labor Economics A conference of the Universities—National Bureau Committee for Economic Research, 63–105.
- Smith, K. “Wives as Breadwinners: Wives’ Share of Family Earnings Hits Historic High during the Second Year of the Great Recession” Carsey Institute Fact Sheet No. 20, Fall 2010.
- Rampell, C. (2010, July 2). Bleak outlook for the long-term unemployed. New York Times Economix blog.
- Serneels, P. (2002). The Added Worker Effect and intrahousehold aspects of unemployment. Centre for the Study of African Economies Working Paper Series.
