= Spatial mismatch =

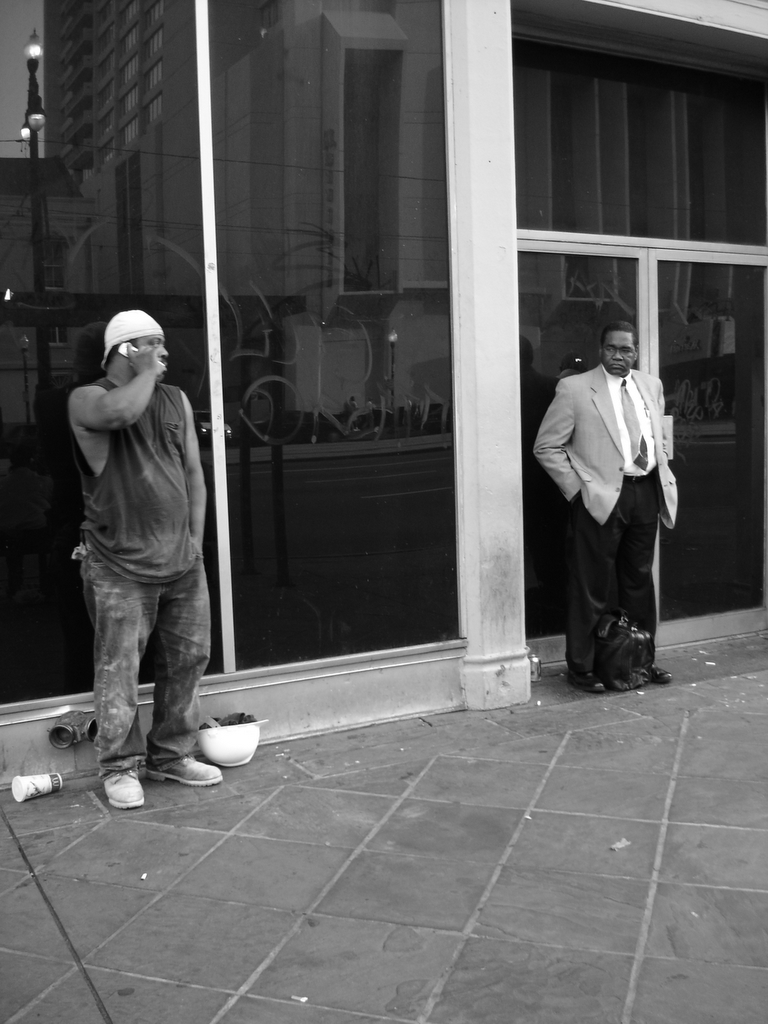
According to the spatial mismatch theory, opportunities for low-income people are located far away from where they live.

Spatial mismatch refers to the mismatch between where low-income workers reside and where suitable job opportunities are located, and the hypothesis that this causes worse labor market outcomes.

It was originally introduced by John F. Kain as a hypothesis for understanding the lack of job opportunities affecting African-Americans, as a result of residential segregation, economic restructuring, and the suburbanization of employment. The hypothesis has since found support and been used as a framework to evaluate access to education and economies outside of the United States.

== History in the United States ==
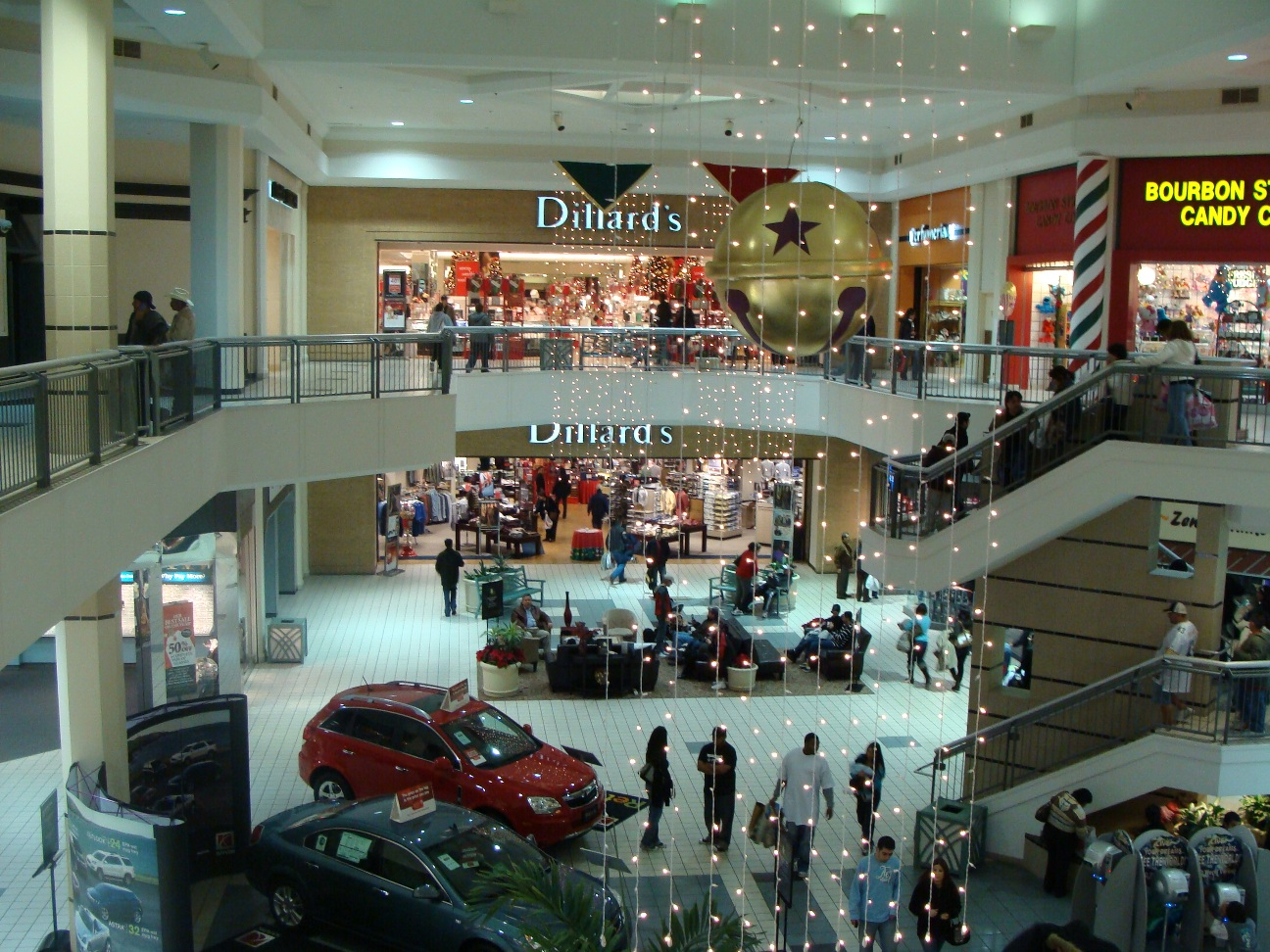
Suburban shopping malls took employment out of the inner city.

After World War I, many wealthy Americans started decentralizing out of the cities and into the suburbs. During the second half of the 20th century, department stores followed the trend of moving into the suburbs. In 1968, Kain formulated the “Spatial Mismatch Hypothesis” in his article "Housing Segregation, Negro Employment, and Metropolitan Decentralization" but he did not refer to it by this term. His hypothesis was that black workers reside in segregated zones that are distant and poorly connected to major centers of growth.The phenomenon has many implications for inner-city residents dependent on low-level entry jobs. For example, distance from work centers can lead to increasing unemployment rates and further dampen poverty outcomes for the region at large. Since its conceptualization in the late 1960s, the spatial mismatch hypothesis has been widely cited to explain the economic problems encountered by inner-city minorities.

== Factors ==
In 2007, Laurent Gobillon, Harris Selod, and Yves Zenou suggested that there are seven different factors that support the spatial mismatch phenomenon. Four factors are attributed to potential workers accessibility and initiatives. The remaining three factors stress employers' reluctance to divert away from the negative stigma of city people and in particular minorities when hiring.

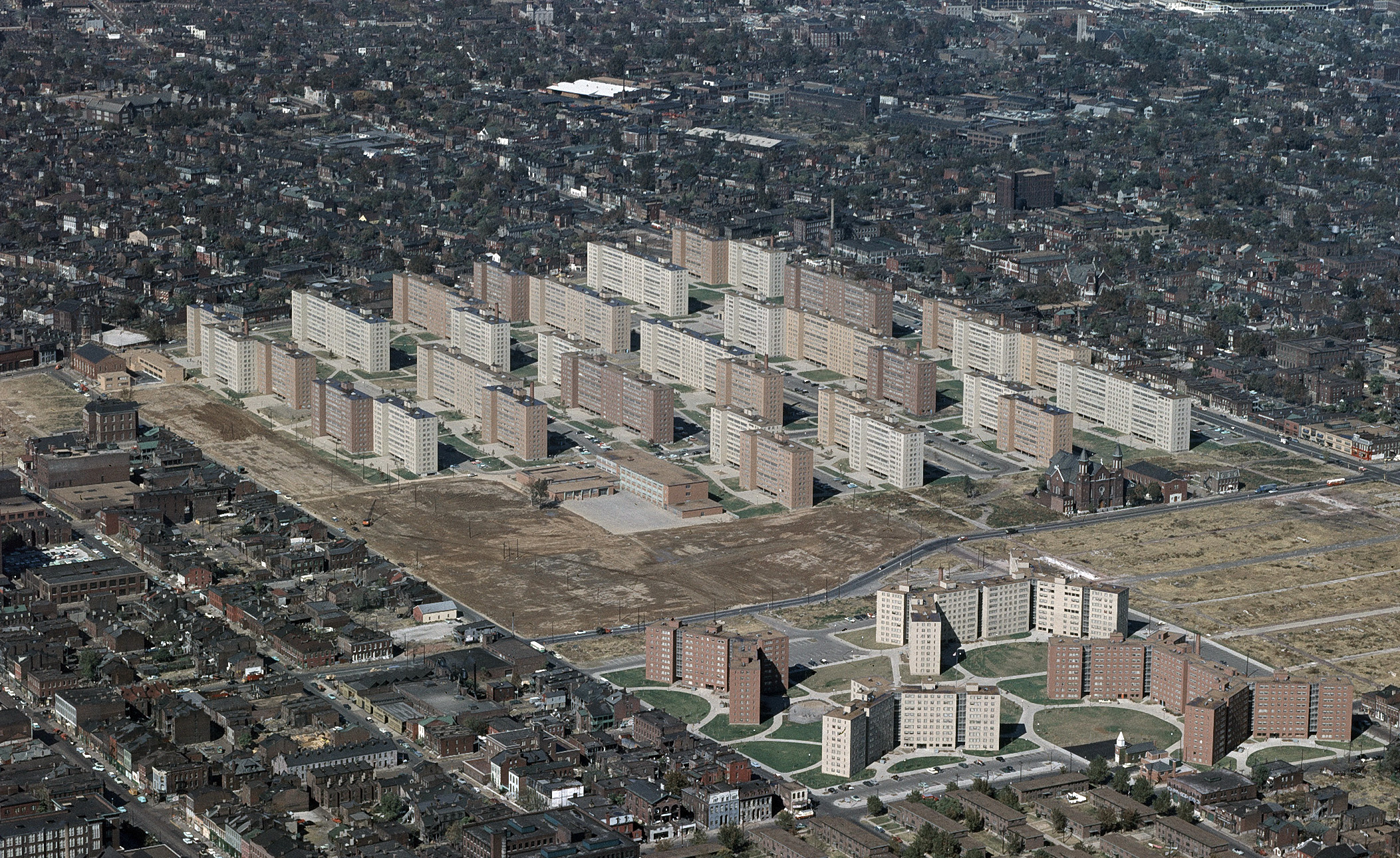
Urban redevelopment projects such as Pruitt–Igoe in St. Louis concentrated and separated workers from their surroundings and work. Such projects created a ghettoized underclass in America.

=== Commuting costs ===
Commuting cost is seen as an obstacle for inner-city people to be present for job interviews and furthermore to arrive to work everyday on time. In other words, cars may be too expensive for some workers and they may have to rely heavily on public transportation. Available public transportation may not be close, affordable, or reliable enough for workers to consider utilizing it for longer commutes.

=== Housing Unaffordability ===
Housing unaffordability in areas where jobs are located also contribute to special mismatch. This factor is particularly notable in areas where employment is tied to tourism. For example, workers in mountain resort towns in Colorado struggle to find housing close to resorts due to high costs in a market geared towards wealthier tourists.

=== Information Access ===
Information access to jobs decreases as distance increases away from the job center. People who are living away from the job center are generally less knowledgeable about potential openings than individuals who live closer to the job center.

=== Difficulty Finding Employment in Distant Job Centers ===
There seems to be a lack of incentive for distance workers to search intensively for a job that is relatively far away. Gobillion, Selod and Zenou believe that workers, more or less, do a tradeoff between short-term loss and long-term benefits. There also seems to be a high search cost involve for urban workers looking for a job in the suburbs. The short term loss involves making frequent search trips to distant work centers, which may not seem worth the trade off to workers, decreasing the likelihood of finding employment further away.

== Spatial mismatch hypothesis outside of the United States ==
Spatial mismatch hypothesis was originally used to explain the shrinking employment opportunities for of inner-city black workers when jobs moved to suburban areas. However, studies within and outside of the United States have found the spatial mismatch hypothesis a useful framework for evaluating employment opportunity in general.

=== East Asia ===
Studies on spatial mismatch in Hong Kong have found similar results to ones in the United States, where low-skilled, often marginalized workers suffer from higher levels of inaccessibility due to the distance between where housing is affordable and where jobs are located. Results found that residents in areas with fewer job opportunities were forced to take riskier, insecure positions, but better public transportation policies, such as allowances, were able to alleviate this affect.

=== Europe ===
In European Union countries, one study found that a higher spatial mismatch index between populations and labor opportunities meant higher regional inequality and lower economic growth. While higher resource allocation was not found to counter these issues, strategies that reduced the gap between people and employment opportunities or attracted skilled labor in low-growth regions were found more likely to be effective.

=== South Asia ===
General socioeconomic segregation in urban Pakistan has been found to contribute to spatial mismatch. In Karachi, Sindh, employers were more likely to discriminate against job applicants the further they lived from positions in wealthier areas, further limiting job opportunities for low-income applicants.

The theory has also been used to examine access to education. In Islamabad, Pakistan, studies used the spatial mismatch hypothesis to identify distance from schools and universities as a factor limiting higher education for women, especially where commutes cannot guarantee safety as a woman.

=== Latin America ===
In Chile, Mexico, and Brazil, spatial mismatch between low-income residents and job opportunities has resulted in an increase of informal neighborhoods in violation of zoning laws closer to where jobs are located.

In Bogota, Colombia the lack of job opportunities close to where residents live result in an uptick of informal, low-income work.

=== Sub-Saharan Africa ===
On a 1995 study on Zimbabwe, spatial mismatch between working populations and land of good potential was identified as a factor contributing towards rural food insecurity. The study found that colonial-era land policies led to land apportionments preventing workers from accessing agricultural employment opportunities on arable land.

== See also ==
- Involuntary unemployment
- Reverse commute
- Theory of alienation
