= John F. Kain =

American economist

- Born: November 9, 1935; Fort Wayne, Indiana, US
- Died: August 4, 2003 (aged 67); Dallas, Texas, US
- Occupation: Academic
- Known for: Spatial mismatch theory
- Spouse: Mary Fan

Academic background
- Education: Bowling Green State University, University of California, Berkeley

Academic work
- Discipline: Economist
- Notable works: "Housing Segregation, Negro Employment, and Metropolitan Decentralization"
- Notable ideas: Spatial Mismatch Theory, Transportation Economics

John Forrest Kain (November 9, 1935 – August 4, 2003) was an American empirical economist and college professor. He is notable for first hypothesising spatial mismatch theory, whereby he argued that there are insufficient job opportunities in low-income household areas. Kain is also notable for his focus on transport economics, for his long career of teaching at Harvard University and the University of Texas at Dallas, as well as for founding the Texas Schools Project.

== Education ==
Kain earned a Bachelor of Arts (BA) majoring in economics from Bowling Green State University in 1957. It is said that during his time at college that he developed is intense interest in the intersection of geography, schools, and race, due to witnessing severe racism towards classmates during the 1950s and 1960s. Kain obtained a Master of Arts (MA) and Doctor of Philosophy (PhD) from the University of California, Berkeley.

== Career ==
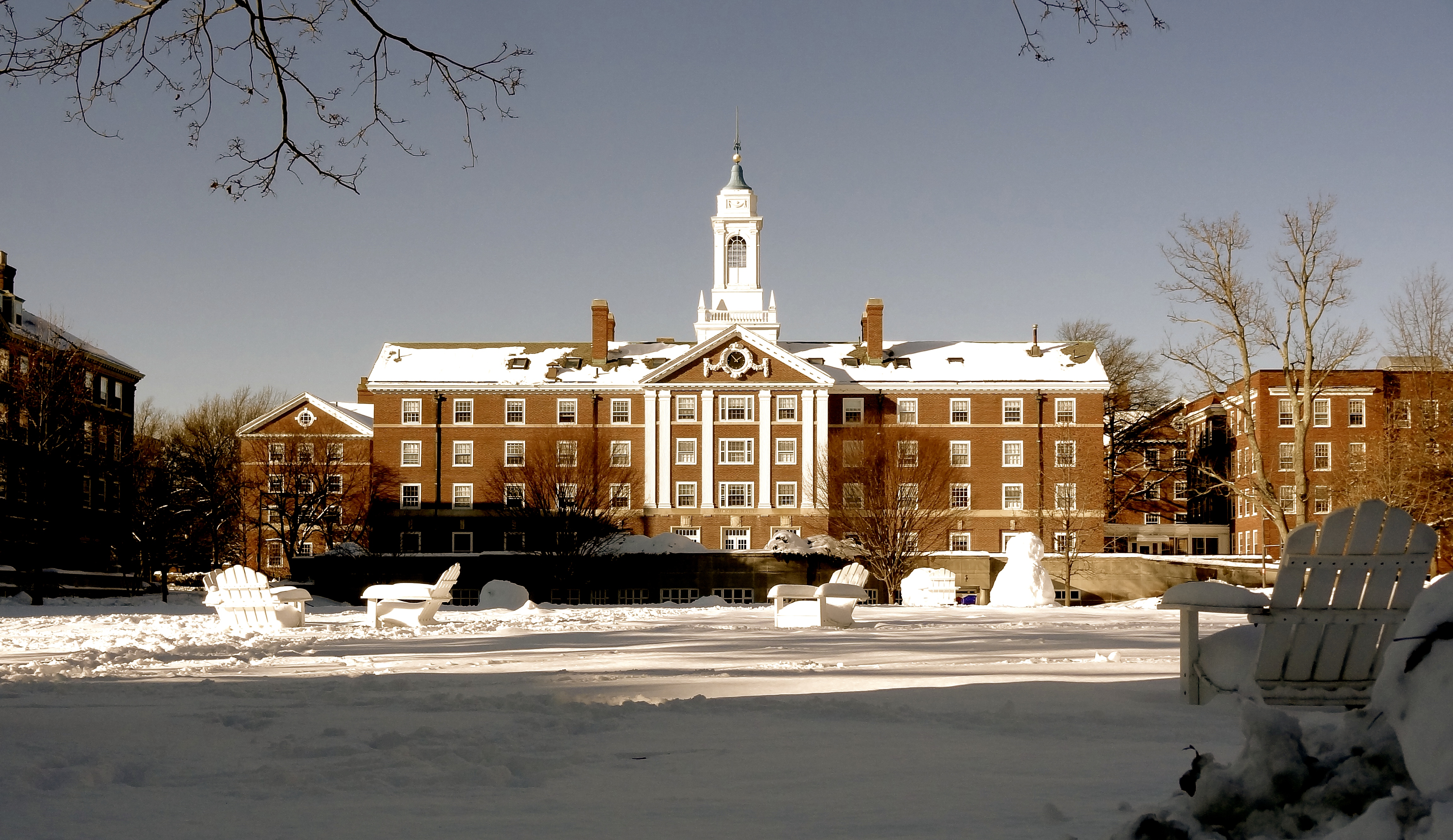
Harvard University, where Kain authored the pioneering article "Housing Segregation, Negro Employment and Metropolitan Decentralisation"

Kain's first job was teaching at the United States Air Force Academy in Colorado Springs. During this time, he worked with Harvard's John Meyer, on a joint project at the Rand Corporation regarding “The Urban Transportation Problem”, which pioneered other work on transportation economics both in developed and developing countries. After this research, Kain aworked as an international consultant on transportation issues. He is known to have argued against rail extensions in Singapore and Alewife, stating that buses are the preferred urban transportation system.

While at Harvard, Kain wrote "Housing Segregation, Negro Employment and Metropolitan Decentralization", which became his most cited work. This article examined the unemployment rate among African Americans and its relationship with job locality. His hypothesis was that the high unemployment rate was due to lack of job opportunities within close proximity.

Kain also used findings from his research on job and home location to construct computer simulation equilibrium models of urban housing markets. These models were significant as they were able to address important housing policy and urban dynamics questions on a large scale, as compared with previous research in which these issues where addressed on a micro scale.

In Kain's later career, during the 1980s, he shifted his focus to conducting large scale research on Texas public schools, and eventually founded the Texas Schools Project in 1992. Kain established confidential data-sharing agreements with local and state school districts to gather information. This information was compiled from many sources into a longitudinal database to provide individual records on school completion and employment history. This research examined the relationship between the impact of black suburbanisation on individual school performance. The results of this research found that African American people in higher quality inner city schools scored significantly higher on standardised test than other African American people with nearly identical conditions, with the difference of attending a lower quality inner city school. This researched led to many more papers on the impact of location, teachers, and school conditions on academic achievement.

=== Spatial Mismatch Theory ===
Kain's article "Housing Segregation, Negro Employment and Metropolitan Decentralization" led to the development of the spatial mismatch hypothesis, although this term however was not coined in this article. The spatial mismatch hypothesis refers to the lack of job opportunities in low income, African American household areas. The factors contributing to the spatial mismatch phenomenon include potential workers' accessibility and initiatives, and employers' cognitive biases surrounding the negative stigma of minorities when hiring.

The spatial mismatch hypothesis was extended in 1987 by William Julius Wilson, who researched the role of economic restructuring and the departure of the African American middle class in the shaping of the ghetto lower-class.

=== Transportation Economics ===
Transportation economics examines the allocation of resources and supply and demand in the public transport sector. Kain worked closely with John Meyer on "The Urban Transportation Problem", which led to the development of Transport Economics theory. Kain claimed that urban transportation systems are more successful with buses than trains due to public regulation hindering innovation. The article also highlights the switch from public transportation to cars due to the rising costs of public transport and suburbanization in the United States.

== Significance and legacy ==
Kain's research on urban economics influenced policy measures regarding housing discrimination and job opportunities. Following the Watts riots in California during the 1960s, Kain influenced the official response. Kain was also a consultant for various United States governmental agencies such as the U.S. Commission of Civil Rights, and the U.S. Environmental Protection Agency.

Kain mentored economists including John Quigley, Rick Hanushek and David T Ellwood.

From 1975 to 1981, Kain chaired the Department of City and Regional Planning.

Kain also held the Cecil and Ida Green Chair for the Study of Science and Society and Director of the Cecil and Ida Green Center for the Study of Science and Society at UT Dallas, as well as concurrently holding a position as Professor of Economics and Professor of Political Economy at UT Dallas.

=== Texas Schools Project ===
While at Harvard, Kain founded The Texas Schools Project in 1992. The Texas Schools Project aims to provide independent, high-quality academic research to improve schools in Texas. Kain developed this organization after discovering the online testing used by public schools in the state for core subjects. He wanted to develop a system to determine the reasons for discrepancies in results. Kain used the data from online testing to develop a database of administrative level education data. The Texas Schools Project currently exists and continues to improve academic results, teacher effectiveness, increase the number of students attaining postsecondary education, and improve labor market outcomes for students.

== Research ==
Among the papers authored, co-authored or influenced by Kain are:

- The Urban Transportation Problem (1965)
- Housing Segregation, Negro Employment and Metropolitan Decentralisation (1968)
- An Econometric Model Of Metropolitan Development (1963)
- The Big Cities’ Big Problem (1966)
- Forecasting Car Ownership and Use (1966)
- Measuring the Value of Housing Quality (1970)
- Evaluating the Quality of the Residential Environment (1970)
- On the value of the equality of educational opportunity as a guide to public policy (1972)
- Housing Market Discrimination, Homeownership, and Savings Behaviour (1972)
- A Note on Owner's Estimate of Housing Value (1972)
- The Detroit Prototype of the NBER Urban Stimulation Model (1973)
- Empirical Models of Urban Land Use: Suggestions on Research Objectives and Organization (1973)
- A Simple Model of Housing Production and the Abandonment Problem (1973)
- Housing Market Discrimination, Homeownership, and Savings Behavior: Reply. (1974)
- What Should Housing Policies Be? (1974)
- Reply to Stanley Masters' Comment on "Housing Segregation, Negro Employment, and Metropolitan Decentralization (1974)
- Automobile and the regulation of its impact on the environment (1975)
- Housing Markets and Racial Discrimination: A Microeconomic Analysis (1977)
- Commutes, Quits, and Moves (1991)
- The Use of Straw Men in the Economic Evaluation of Rail Transport Projects (1992)
- The Spatial Mismatch Hypothesis: Three Decades Later (1993)
- Moving to the Suburbs: Do Relocating Companies Leave Their Black Employees Behind? (1996)
- Equality of Educational Opportunity (1996)
- Teachers, Schools, and Academic Achievement (1998)
- Does Special Education Raise Academic Achievement for Students with Disabilities? (1998)
- Secrets of Success: Assessing the Large Increases in Transit Ridership Achieved by Houston and San Diego Transit Providers (1999)
- Do Higher Salaries Buy Better Teachers? (1999)
- Why Public Schools Lose Teachers (2001)
- A Tale of Two Cities: Relationships Between Urban Form, Car Ownership and Use and Implications for Public Policy (2001)
- Disruption Versus Tiebout Improvement: The Costs and Benefits of Switching Schools (2001)
- A Pioneer's Perspective on the Spatial Mismatch Literature (2001)
- Inferring Program Effects for Special Populations: Does Special Education Raise Achievement for Students with Disabilities? (2002)
- The Impact of Charter Schools on Academic Achievement (2002)
- Teachers, Schools, and Academic Achievement (2005)

== Personal life and influences ==
Close of friends of Kain claim that witnessing racism towards his African-American football teammates in the 1950s influenced and drove his commitment to racial justice. Kain's interest in employment opportunities and location is due to the post World War || decentralisation.

Kain was married to his wife, Mary Fan, for 46 years, before his death in 2003. Together, they had two daughters, Mary Jo Kain Earle and Joanna Kain Gentsch, and four grandchildren.

Kain died in 2003 after battling cancer.
