= HPO =

HPO may refer to:

- HPO formalism, an approach to temporal quantum logic
- Hamilton Philharmonic Orchestra, a symphony orchestra based in Ontario, Canada
- High Performance Option in IBM products like CICS and z/OS
- High performance organization, a conceptual framework for organizations
- Highway Post Office, of the United States Postal Service
- Homeowner Protection Office, in British Columbia, Canada
- Hpon language, spoken in Burma
- Human Phenotype Ontology
- Humanist Party of Ontario, a political party in Canada
- Hydrogen peroxide, an oxidizer
- Premnaspirodiene oxygenase, an enzyme
- Hippo, a protein kinase involved in the Hippo signaling pathway
- Hyperparameter optimization, a technique used in automated machine learning
