= Robert van Gasteren =

Dutch politician (born 1959)

Member of the Senate
- Incumbent
- Assumed office 11 July 2023
- Preceded by: Jan Klopman

Personal details
- Born: Robert Maria Johannes van Gasteren; 7 January 1959 (age 67) Rotterdam, Netherlands
- Party: Farmer–Citizen Movement (until 2026)
- Education: Erasmus University
- Occupation: Corporate executive; human resources manager; politician

Robert Maria Johannes van Gasteren (Dutch pronunciation: [ˈrɔbərt fɑŋ ˈɣɑstərə(n)]; born 7 January 1959) is a Dutch politician and corporate executive. After studying law in his birthplace of Rotterdam, he worked in human resource management, rising to director-level positions in IT services companies. He worked at multinational Capgemini for twelve years and became chief operating officer (COO) of a smaller IT services company in 2016. Van Gasteren was the chief executive officer (CEO) of a managed services provider between 2017 and 2019 before serving as an independent management advisor.

He ran for a Senate seat in 2023 as a member of the Farmer–Citizen Movement (BBB). Van Gasteren was not elected, but he was appointed to the Senate on 11 July 2023 following the stepping down of another member. He left the party in March 2026, continuing as an independent politician.

== Early life and career ==
Van Gasteren was born in Rotterdam on 7 January 1959. He studied law at Erasmus University Rotterdam for four years until 1982 and started his career in human resource management at a chemical company. He subsequently moved to IT services companies such as Oracle and the Computer Sciences Corporation (CSC). Magazine Computable wrote in 2001 how Van Gasteren was introducing a new flexible employee benefits package at Inter Access, which had six different packages due to recent takeovers. Van Gasteren described that a flexible package might not decrease costs but could help employee retention. He started working for the French IT services and consulting company Capgemini in 2004, filling executive positions in human resources and outsourcing. In a trade publication, Van Gasteren characterized Capgemini as a high performance organization and said this implied HR was trying to influence its bottom and top line, when the board was aiming to double revenue. He also mentioned the company was naming, shaping, and measuring HR processes rather than capturing them in detailed procedures.

Van Gasteren left Capgemini in early 2016 to take the job of chief operating officer (COO) at IT services company Vanad Group, headquartered in Capelle aan den IJssel and founded ten years before. In April 2017, he succeeded co-founder Rob de Laat as CEO of a managed services provider called Staffing MS and formed the board of directors together with co-founder and CFO/COO Wouter Waaijenberg. The Rotterdam company had been founded in 2008, and it mainly assisted municipalities, educational institutions, and healthcare organizations as well as international for-profit businesses. When an indirect competitor acquired Staffing MS in November 2018, the company kept operating as an independent subsidiary but Van Gasteren was replaced as CEO by Waaijenberg. Van Gasteren subsequently became an independent management advisor, and he continued his activities as partner of an international consultancy called Annlyz Growth Partners, which he had co-founded in 2014.

Since 2015, he has been on the board of directors of the Achmea Society, a majority shareholder of financial services company Achmea.

== Politics ==
Van Gasteren is a member of the Farmer–Citizen Movement (BBB), which first participated in elections in 2021 and was co-founded by agricultural journalist Caroline van der Plas. Van Gasteren was the party's 18th candidate in the May 2023 Senate election. The ballot listed Bergschenhoek as his place of residence. He was not elected, while the BBB won a plurality in the Senate of 16 seats amidst discontent about the government's policy to combat the nitrogen crisis – affecting farmers – and general distrust of established political parties. Van Gasteren was appointed to the Senate on 11 July 2023 due to his spot on the party list when Jan Klopman stepped down to join the provincial executive of Flevoland. In the Senate, Van Gasteren focuses on employment, foreign affairs, defense, and NATO. He joined Mona Keijzer in ending his membership of the BBB on 27 March 2026 at a special general meeting. He intended to remain part of the BBB group in the Senate, but he was removed from the parliamentary group days later.

=== Senate committee assignments ===
- Committee on Foreign Affairs, Defense and Development Cooperation
- Committee on Kingdom Relations
- Committee on Social Affairs and Employment

== Electoral history ==
Electoral history of Robert van Gasteren
Year	Body	Party	Pos.	Votes	Result		Ref.
Year	Body	Party	Pos.	Votes	Party seats	Individual	Ref.
2023	Senate	Farmer–Citizen Movement	18	0 (Note: To account for population differences between provinces, a weighted vote total of 0 is used.)	16	Lost (Note: Van Gasteren was appointed to the body later during the term due to a vacancy.)	
