= Claire Wallace =

Claire Wallace may refer to:

- Claire Wallace (sociologist)
- Claire Wallace (broadcaster)
