= Household =

Group sharing accommodation and meals

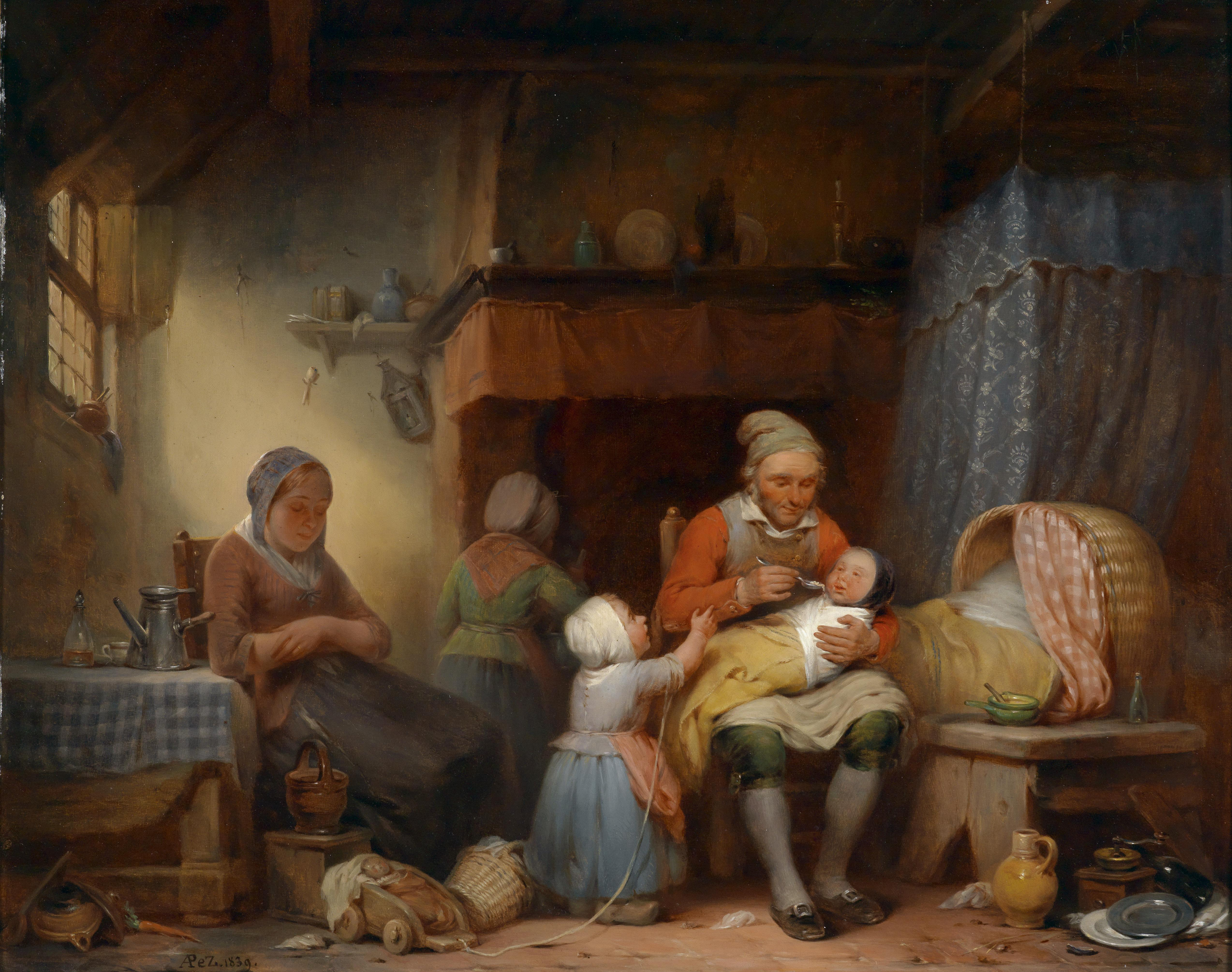
Familienidylle by Aimé Pez, 1839

A household consists of one or more persons who live in the same dwelling. It may be of a single family or another type of person group. The household is the basic unit of analysis in many social, microeconomic and government models, and is important to economics and inheritance.

Household models include families, blended families, shared housing, group homes, boarding houses, houses of multiple occupancy (UK), and single room occupancy (US). In feudal societies, the royal household and medieval households of the wealthy included servants and other retainers.

== Government definitions ==
For statistical purposes in the United Kingdom, a household is defined as "one person or a group of people who have the accommodation as their only or main residence and for a group, either share at least one meal a day or share the living accommodation, that is, a living room or sitting room". The introduction of legislation to control houses of multiple occupations in the UK Housing Act (2004) required a tighter definition of a single household. People can be considered a household if they are related: full- or half-blood, foster, step-parent/child, in-laws (and equivalent for unmarried couples), a married couple or unmarried but "living as ..." (same- or different-sex couples).

The United States Census definition also hinges on "separate living quarters": "those in which the occupants live and eat separately from any other persons in the building." According to the U.S. census, a householder is the "person (or one of the people) in whose name the housing unit is owned or rented (maintained)"; if no person qualifies, any adult resident of a housing unit is considered a householder. The U.S. government formerly used "head of the household" and "head of the family", but those terms were replaced with "householder" in 1980. In the census definition of a household, it

... includes all the persons who occupy a housing unit. A housing unit is a house, an apartment, a mobile home, a group of rooms, or a single room that is occupied (or if vacant, is intended for occupancy) as separate living quarters. Separate living quarters are those in which the occupants live and eat separately from any other persons in the building and which have direct access from the outside of the building or through a common hall. The occupants may be a single family, one person living alone, two or more families living together, or any other group of related or unrelated persons who share living arrangements. (People not living in households are classified as living in group quarters.)

On July 15, 1998, Statistics Canada said: "A household is generally defined as being composed of a person or group of persons who co-reside in, or occupy, a dwelling."

== Economic definition ==
Although a one-income-stream economic theory simplifies modeling, it does not necessarily reflect reality. Many, if not most, households have several income-earning members. Most economic models do not equate households and traditional families, and there is not always a one-to-one relationship between households and families.

== Social definitions ==
In social work, a household is defined similarly: a residential group in which housework is divided and performed by householders. Care may be delivered by one householder to another, depending upon their respective needs, abilities, and (perhaps) disabilities. Household composition may affect life and health expectations and outcomes for its members. Eligibility for community services and welfare benefits may depend upon household composition.

In sociology, household work strategy (a term coined by Ray Pahl in his 1984 book, Divisions of Labour) is the division of labour among members of a household. Household work strategies vary over the life cycle as household members age, or with the economic environment; they may be imposed by one person, or be decided collectively.

Feminism examines how gender roles affect the division of labour in households. In The Second Shift and The Time Bind, sociologist Arlie Russell Hochschild presents evidence that in two-career couples men and women spend about equal amounts of time working; however, women spend more time on housework. Cathy Young (another feminist writer) says that in some cases, women may prevent the equal participation of men in housework and parenting.

== Models ==
Household models in the English-speaking world include traditional and blended families, shared housing, and group homes for people with support needs. Other models which may meet definitions of a household include boarding houses, houses in multiple occupation (UK), and single room occupancy (US).

== History ==
In feudal or aristocratic societies, a household may include servants or retainers who derive their income from the household's principal income.

== Housing statistics ==
Dwellings with bathrooms
Country	1960	1970	1980
Belgium	23.6%	49.1%	73.9%
Denmark	39.4%	73.1%	85.4%
France	28.0%	48.9%	85.2%
Germany	51.9%	71.5%	92.3%
Greece	10.4%	-	69.3%
Ireland	33.0%	55.3%	82.0%
Italy	10.7%	64.5%	86.4%
Luxembourg	45.7%	69.4%	86.2%
Netherlands	30.3%	75.5%	95.9%
Portugal	18.6%	-	58%
Spain	24.0%	77.8%	85.3%
United Kingdom	78.3%	90.9%	98.0%

Indoor WC, bath/shower and hot running water (1988)
Country	Indoor WC	Bath/shower	Hot running water
Belgium	94%	92%	87%
Denmark	97%	94%	N/A
France	94%	93%	95%
Germany	99%	97%	98%
Greece	85%	85%	84%
Ireland	94%	92%	91%
Italy	99%	95%	93%
Luxembourg	99%	97%	97%
Netherlands	N/A	99%	100%
Portugal	80%	N/A	N/A
Spain	97%	96%	N/A
UK	99%	100%	N/A

1981–82 censuses
Country	Bath/shower	Indoor WC	Central heating
Belgium	73.9%	79.0%	-
Denmark	85.1%	95.8%	54.6%
France	85.2%	85.4%	67.6%
Germany	92.3%	96.0%	70.0%
Greece	69.3%	70.9%	-
Ireland	82.0%	84.5%	39.2%
Italy	86.4%	87.7%	56.5%
Luxembourg	86.2%	97.3%	73.9%
Netherlands	95.9%	-	66.1%
Portugal	58.0%	58.7%	-
Spain	85.3%	-	22.5%
United Kingdom	98.0%	97.3%	-

Average usable floor space, 1976
Country	Area
Austria	86 m^{2} (930 sq ft)
Belgium	97 m^{2} (1,040 sq ft)
Bulgaria	63 m^{2} (680 sq ft)
Canada	89 m^{2} (960 sq ft)
Czechoslovakia	69 m^{2} (740 sq ft)
Denmark	122 m^{2} (1,310 sq ft)
Finland	71 m^{2} (760 sq ft)
France	82 m^{2} (880 sq ft)
East Germany	60 m^{2} (650 sq ft)
West Germany	95 m^{2} (1,020 sq ft)
Greece	80 m^{2} (860 sq ft)
Hungary	65 m^{2} (700 sq ft)
Ireland	88 m^{2} (950 sq ft)
Luxembourg	107 m^{2} (1,150 sq ft)
Netherlands	71 m^{2} (760 sq ft)
Norway	89 m^{2} (960 sq ft)
Poland	58 m^{2} (620 sq ft)
Portugal	104 m^{2} (1,120 sq ft)
Romania	54 m^{2} (580 sq ft)
Soviet Union	49 m^{2} (530 sq ft)
Spain	82 m^{2} (880 sq ft)
Sweden	109 m^{2} (1,170 sq ft)
Switzerland	98 m^{2} (1,050 sq ft)
United Kingdom	70 m^{2} (750 sq ft)
United States	120 m^{2} (1,300 sq ft)
Yugoslavia	65 m^{2} (700 sq ft)

Average usable floor space, 1994
Country	Area
Austria	85.3 m^{2} (918 sq ft)
Belgium	86.3 m^{2} (929 sq ft)
Denmark	107 m^{2} (1,150 sq ft)
Finland	74.8 m^{2} (805 sq ft)
France	85.4 m^{2} (919 sq ft)
East Germany	64.4 m^{2} (693 sq ft)
West Germany	86.7 m^{2} (933 sq ft)
Greece	79.6 m^{2} (857 sq ft)
Ireland	88 m^{2} (950 sq ft)
Italy	92.3 m^{2} (994 sq ft)
Luxembourg	107 m^{2} (1,150 sq ft)
Netherlands	98.6 m^{2} (1,061 sq ft)
Spain	86.6 m^{2} (932 sq ft)
Sweden	92 m^{2} (990 sq ft)
United Kingdom	79.7 m^{2} (858 sq ft)

Floor space, 1992–1993
Country	Year	Area
Australia	1993	191 m^{2} (2,060 sq ft)
United States	1992	153.2 m^{2} (1,649 sq ft)
South Korea	1993	119.3 m^{2} (1,284 sq ft)
United Kingdom	1992	95 m^{2} (1,020 sq ft)
Germany	1993	90.8 m^{2} (977 sq ft)
Japan	1993	88.6 m^{2} (954 sq ft)

Households without an indoor WC, 1980
Country	%
Belgium	19%
France	17%
West Germany	7%
Greece	29%
Ireland	22%
Italy	11%
Japan	54%
Norway	17%
Portugal	43%
Spain	12%
United Kingdom	6%

Households without a bath or shower
Country	%
Belgium	24%
France	17%
West Germany	11%
Italy	11%
Japan	17%
Norway	18%
Spain	39%
United Kingdom	4%

Households with an indoor WC
Country	1960–61	1970–71	1978–79
Britain	87%	88%	95%
Germany	64%	85%	92.5%

Households with a bath or shower
Country	1960–61	1970–71	1978–79
Britain	72%	91%	94.3%
Germany	51%	82%	89.1%

Principal residences in France lacking amenities:
Year	Running water	WC	Bath or shower	Central heating
1962	21.6%	59.5%	71.1%	80.7%
1968	9.2%	45.2%	52.5%	65.1%
1975	2.8%	26.2%	29.8%	46.9%
1978	1.3%	20.9%	22.9%	39.7%

Households with central heating
Country	1970	1978
Great Britain	34%	53%
Germany	44%	64%

US dwellings with bathroom amenities, 1970
Amenity	%
Bath/shower	95%
Flush toilet	96%

East German amenities
Amenity	1961	1971	1979
Running water	66%	82.2%	89%
WC	33%	41.8%	50%
Bath/shower	22.4%	38.7%	50%
Central heating	2.5%	10.6%	22%

Amenities in European dwellings, 1970–71
Country	Running water	WC	Bath/shower
Austria	84.2%	69.8%	52.9%
Belgium	88.0%	50.4%	47.8%
Czechoslovakia	75.3%	49.0%	58.6%
Denmark	98.7%	90.3%	76.5%
Finland	72.0%	61.4%	-
Greece	64.9%	41.2%	35.6%
Hungary	36.1%	27.2%	31.7%
Ireland	78.2%	69.2%	55.4%
Italy	86.1%	79.0%	64.5%
Netherlands	-	80.8%	81.4%
Norway	97.5%	69.0%	66.1%
Portugal	47.8%	33.7%	32.6%
Spain	70.9%	70.9%	46.4%
Sweden	97.4%	90.1%	78.3%
Switzerland	-	93.3%	80.9%
United Kingdom	-	86.3%	90.7%
Yugoslavia	33.6%	26.2%	24.6%

British households lacking amenities
Year	Bath	Indoor/outdoor WC	Hot running water	Indoor WC
1951	37.6%	7.7%	-	-
1961	22.4%	6.5%	21.8%	-
1966	15.4%	1.7%	12.5%	18.3%
1971	9.1%	1.1%	6.5%	11.5%

British households sharing amenities
Year	Bath	Indoor/outdoor WC	Hot running water	Indoor WC
1951	7.5%	14.9%	-	-
1961	4.4%	6.7%	1.8%	-
1966	4.1%	6.4%	2.0%	4.4%
1971	3.2%	4.1%	1.9%	3.1%

Households with durable goods, 1964–1971
Country	Year	Washing machine	Refrigerator	Television	Telephone
Northern Ireland	1971	45.4%	40.1%	87.5%	27.0%
Scotland	1971	65.0%	53.2%	92.1%	36.1%
United Kingdom	1964	53.0%	34.0%	80.0%	2.2%
United Kingdom	1971	64.3%	68.8%	91.4%	37.8%
United States	1965	87.4%	99.5%	97.1%	85.0%
United States	1970	92.1%	99.85	98.7%	92.0%

EEC manual workers with durable goods, 1963–1964
Country	Washing machine	Refrigerator	Television	Telephone
Belgium	74.7%	24.9%	47.6%	8.2%
France	39.6%	47.0%	34.4%	1.4%
West Germany	66.2%	62.1%	51.3%	1.8%
Italy	13.6%	50.2%	47.9%	20.0%
Luxembourg	82.3%	64.7%	27.9%	23.0%
Netherlands	80.4%	25.5%	58.0%	9.4%

EEC white-collar workers with durable goods, 1963–1964
Country	Washing machine	Refrigerator	Television	Telephone
Belgium	68.5%	57.3%	48.3%	40.0%
France	48.2%	71.3%	43.3%	15.2%
West Germany	62.2%	79.1%	51.8%	19.6%
Italy	38.3%	81.9%	79.3%	57.9%
Luxembourg	82.3%	79.2%	25.2%	67.3%
Netherlands	73.9%	51.6%	56.2%	57.4%

Dwellings with amenities, 1960–71
Country	Year	Running water	Indoor running water	Toilet	Flush toilet	Bath/shower
Austria	1961	100.0%	63.6%	-	-	29.6%
Austria	1970	-	85.3%	69.7%	-	54.5%
Belgium	1961	76.9%	-	99.9%	47.6%	24.3%
Bulgaria	1965	28.5%	28.2%	100.0%	11.8%	8.7%
Canada	1961	89.1%	-	-	85.2%	80.3%
Canada	1967	-	95.2%	93.5%	92.5%	89.8%
Canada	1971	-	-	-	95.4%	93.4%
Czechoslovakia	1961	60.5%	49.1%	-	39.5%	33.3%
Denmark	1960	-	92.9%	100.0%	83.6%	48.3%
Denmark	1965	96.7%	96.7%	100.0%	90.9%	63.4%
England and Wales	1961	-	98.7%	93.4%	-	78.7%
England and Wales	1966	-	-	-	98.2%	85.1%
Finland	1960	47.1%	47.1%	-	35.4%	14.6%
France	1962	-	77.5%	43.1%	39.3%	28.0%
France	1968	92.8%	91.5%	56.2%	53.2%	48.9%
East Germany	1961	-	65.7%	33.7%	-	22.1%
West Germany	1965	-	98.2%	-	83.3%	64.3%
West Germany	1968	99.0%	-	-	86.5%	66.8%
Hungary	1960	-	-	100.0%	22.5%	-
Hungary	1963	32.5%	25.9%	-	-	18.5%
Hungary	1970	58.6%	36.4%	100.0%	32.7%	32.2%
Ireland	1961	57.2%	51.0%	64.9%	53.5%	33.2%
Italy	1961	71.6%	62.3%	89.5%	-	28.9%
Luxembourg	1960	98.8%	-	100.0%	81.6%	45.7%
Netherlands	1956	89.6%	-	99.9%	67.5%	26.8%
New Zealand	1960	-	90.0%	-	-	-
New Zealand	1961	99.6%	87.8%	-	88.5%	-
New Zealand	1966	99.7%	90.3%	-	94.0%	98.1%
Norway	1960	94.0%	92.8%	100.0%	57.9%	45.2%
Poland	1960	39.1%	29.9%	26.9%	18.9%	13.9%
Poland	1966	-	46.8%	-	33.3%	-
Romania	1966	48.4%	12.3%	100.0%	12.2%	9.6%
Scotland	1961	-	94.0%	-	92.8%	69.9%
Scotland	1966	-	-	-	95.7%	77.4%
Sweden	1960	-	90.0%	-	76.2%	61.0%
Sweden	1965	95.2%	94.3%	99.7%	85.3%	72.9%
Switzerland	1960	-	96.1%	99.7%	-	68.8%
United States	1960	94.0%	92.9%	-	89.7%	88.1%
Yugoslavia (urban)	1961	-	42.4%	34.5%	-	22.5%

European households with at least one car, 1978
Country	%
Belgium	69.9%
Denmark	57.0%
France	66.9%
West Germany	62.6%
Ireland	65.1%
Italy	69.1%
Netherlands	67.2%
United Kingdom	54.4%

Housing tenure, 1980–1990
Country	Year	Public rental	Private rental	Owner-occupied
Australia	1988	5%	25%	70%
Belgium	1986	6%	30%	62%
Denmark	1990	21%	21%	58%
France	1990	17%	30%	53%
Germany	1990	25%	38%	37%
Ireland	1990	14%	9%	78%
Italy	1990	5%	24%	64%
Netherlands	1988	43%	13%	44%
Spain	1989	1%	11%	88%
United Kingdom	1990	27%	7%	66%
United States	1980	2%	32%	66%

EEC households with a garden, 1963–64
Country	%
Belgium	58%
France	47%
Italy	17%
Netherlands	21%
Germany	45%
Luxembourg	81%

Households with durable goods, 1962
Country	Television	Vacuum cleaner	Washing machine	Refrigerator	Car
France	25%	32%	31%	37%	33%
Great Britain	78%	71%	43%	22%	30%
United States	87%	75%	95%	98%	75%

== Housing conditions ==
=== Belgium ===
A 1961–62 National Housing Institute survey estimated that 13.8 percent of Belgian dwellings were unfit and incapable of improvement. A further 19.5 percent were unfit but had the potential to be improved, and 54 percent were considered suitable (without alteration or improvement) for modern living standards. Seventy-four percent of dwellings lacked a shower or bath, 19 percent had inadequate sewage disposal, and 3.6 percent lacked a drinking-water supply; 36.8 percent had an indoor water closet. According to a 1964 study, 13 percent of Belgium's housing consisted of slums. In 1974 an estimated 17% of the Belgian population lived in a detached house, while 23% lived in an attached house, 56% in an apartment or flat, and 4% in other types of homes (trailers, mobile homes, etc.). In terms of amenities, in 1975 an estimated 1% of all houses were without a flush toilet, 1% without electric lighting, 37% without a fixed bath or shower and 7% without piped water.

=== Austria ===
In 1974 an estimated 28% of the Austrian population lived in a detached house, while 5% lived in an attached house, 64% in an apartment or flat, and 4% in other types of homes (trailers, mobile homes, etc.). In terms of amenities, in 1975 an estimated 10% of all houses were without a flush toilet, 1% without electric lighting, 34% without a fixed bath or shower and 8% without piped water.

=== Ireland ===
In 1974 an estimated 27% of the Irish population lived in a detached house, while 55% lived in an attached house, 11% in an apartment or flat, and 8% in other types of homes (trailers, mobile homes, etc.). In terms of amenities, in 1975 an estimated 21% of all houses were without a flush toilet, 2% without electric lighting, 20% without a fixed bath or shower and 14% without piped water.

=== Japan ===
In 1973 an estimated 65% of the Japanese population lived in a detached house, while 12% lived in an attached house, and 23% in an apartment or flat. In terms of amenities, in 1975 an estimated 65% of all houses were without a flush toilet, 1% without electric lighting, 3% without a fixed bath or shower and 1% without piped water.

=== Netherlands ===
In 1974 an estimated 18% of the Dutch population lived in a detached house, while 40% lived in an attached house, 36% in an apartment or flat, and 6% in other types of homes (trailers, mobile homes, etc.). In terms of amenities, in 1975 an estimated 1% of all houses were without a flush toilet, 1% without electric lighting, 2% without a fixed bath or shower and 1% without piped water.

=== Italy ===
In 1974 an estimated 18% of the Italian population lived in a detached house, while 9% lived in an attached house, 65% in an apartment or flat, and 8% in other types of homes (trailers, mobile homes, etc.). In terms of amenities, in 1975 an estimated 4% of all houses were without a flush toilet, 2% without electric lighting, 27% without a fixed bath or shower and 1% without piped water.

=== Norway ===
In 1974 an estimated 45% of the Norwegian population lived in a detached house, while 7% lived in an attached house, 46% in an apartment or flat, and 2% in other types of homes (trailers, mobile homes, etc.). In terms of amenities, in 1975 an estimated 13% of all houses were without a flush toilet, 1% without electric lighting, 25% without a fixed bath or shower and 1% without piped water.

=== Sweden ===
In 1974 an estimated 36% of the Swedish population lived in a detached house, while 8% lived in an attached house, and 56% in an apartment or flat. In terms of amenities, in 1975 an estimated 2% of all houses were without a flush toilet, 1% without electric lighting, 2% without a fixed bath or shower and 1% without piped water.

=== Denmark ===
In 1974 an estimated 50% of the Danish population lived in a detached house, while 11% lived in an attached house, 31% in an apartment or flat, and 8% in other types of homes (trailers, mobile homes, etc.). In terms of amenities, in 1975 an estimated 1% of all houses were without a flush toilet, 1% without electric lighting, 10% without a fixed bath or shower and 1% without piped water.

=== Switzerland ===
In 1974 an estimated 33% of the Swiss population lived in a detached house, while 5% lived in an attached house, and 62% in an apartment or flat. In terms of amenities, in 1975 an estimated 3% of all houses were without a flush toilet, 1% without electric lighting, 15% without a fixed bath or shower and 1% without piped water.

=== Spain ===
In 1974 an estimated 12% of the Spanish population lived in a detached house, while 23% lived in an attached house, 61% in an apartment or flat, and 4% in other types of homes (trailers, mobile homes, etc.). In terms of amenities, in 1970/75 an estimated 29% of all houses were without a flush toilet, 4% without electric lighting, 54% without a fixed bath or shower and 32% without piped water.

=== West Germany ===
In 1974 an estimated 22% of the West German population lived in a detached house, while 5% lived in an attached house, 69% in an apartment or flat, and 4% in other types of homes (trailers, mobile homes, etc.). In terms of amenities, in 1975 an estimated 4% of all houses were without a flush toilet, 1% without electric lighting, 6% without a fixed bath or shower and 1% without piped water.

=== France ===
Between 1954 and 1973, the percentage of French homes with a shower or bath increased from 10 to 65 percent. During that period, the percentage of homes without flush toilets fell from 73 to 30 percent; homes without running water fell from 42 to 3.4 percent. A 1948 law permitted gradual, long-term rent increases for existing flats on the condition that part of the money was spent on repairs. According to John Ardagh, the law, "vigorously applied, was partly successful in its twofold aim: to encourage both repairs and new building." By 1968, as noted by one study, “most French housing, even in the rural areas, had running water, electricity and the communal amenities of recreation, transport and cultural services.” In 1974 an estimated 17% of the French population lived in a detached house, while 2% lived in an attached house, 78% in an apartment or flat, and 3% in other types of homes (trailers, mobile homes, etc.). In terms of amenities, in 1975 an estimated 20% of all houses were without a flush toilet, 1% without electric lighting, 34% without a fixed bath or shower and 3% without piped water.

=== United Kingdom ===
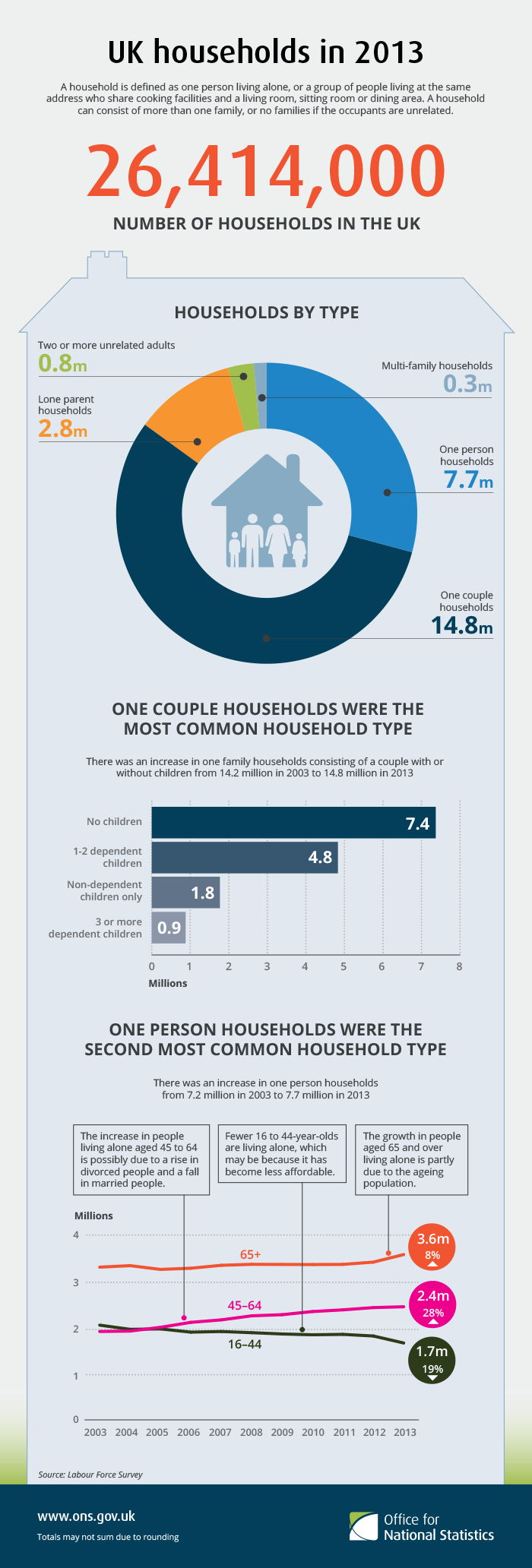
Household composition in the UK

After World War II, a large percentage of British housing was single-family housing. Seventy-eight percent of housing in 1961 consisted of single-family homes, compared to 56 percent in the Netherlands, 49 percent in West Germany and 32 percent in France. In England and Wales in 1964, 6.6 percent of housing units had two or fewer rooms; 5.8 percent had seven or more rooms, 15.2 percent had six rooms, 35.1 percent had five rooms, 26.3 percent had four rooms, and 11.1 percent had three rooms. These figures included kitchens when they were used for eating meals. Fifty percent of 1964 housing had three bedrooms; 1.9 percent had five or more bedrooms, 6.2 percent had four bedrooms, 10.5 percent had one bedroom or none, and 31.3 percent had two bedrooms. A 1960 social survey estimated that 0.6 percent of households in England and Wales exceeded the statutory overcrowding standard; the 1964 percentage was 0.5 percent. In 1964, 6.9 of all households exceeded one person per room. The 1960 figure was 11 percent, with 1.75 percent having two or more bedrooms below the standard and 9.25 percent having one bedroom below the standard. This declined slightly by 1964 to 9.4 percent of households below the standard, with 8.1 percent having one bedroom below the standard and 1.3 percent having two bedrooms or more below the standard. According to local authorities in 1965, five percent of the housing stock in England and Wales was unfit for habitation. In 1974 an estimated 23% of the population of the UK lived in a detached house, while 50% lived in an attached house, 23% in an apartment or flat, and 4% in other types of homes (trailers, mobile homes, etc.). In terms of amenities, in 1975 an estimated 1% of all houses were without a flush toilet, 1% without electric lighting, 3% without a fixed bath or shower and 1% without piped water.

=== U.S. and Canada ===
Housing conditions improved in Canada and the U.S. after World War II. In the U.S., 35.4 percent of all 1950 dwellings did not have complete plumbing facilities; the figure fell to 16.8 percent in 1960 and 8.4 percent in 1968. In Canada from 1951 to 1971, the percentage of dwellings with a bath or shower increased from 60.8 to 93.4 percent; the percentage of dwellings with hot and cold running water increased from 56.9 to 93.5 percent. In the United States from 1950 to 1974, the percentage of housing without full plumbing fell from 34 to three percent; during that period, the percentage of housing stock considered dilapidated fell from nine percent to less than four. In 1976, an estimated 64% of the population of the U.S. lived in a detached house, while 4% lived in an attached house, 28% in an apartment or flat, and 4% in other types of homes (trailers, mobile homes, etc.). In terms of amenities, in 1975 an estimated 2% of all houses in the U.S. were without a flush toilet, 1% without electric lighting, 3% without a fixed bath or shower and 1% without piped water. In 1977 an estimated 59% of the population of Canada lived in a detached house, while 8% lived in an attached house, and 33% in an apartment or flat. In terms of amenities, in 1975/77 an estimated 3% of all houses in Canada were without a flush toilet, 1% without electric lighting, 2% without a fixed bath or shower and 1% without piped water.

== See also ==
- Dwelling
- Oikos
- List of countries by number of households
- Household economics
- Household final consumption expenditure
- Household income in the United States
- Household production
- Family
- Intra-household bargaining
- Roommate
- Group home
- Hoju – South Korea
- Home
- Homemaker
- Medieval household
- Royal Household

== Sources ==
- The Economist Book Of Vital World Statistics: A Complete Guide To The World In Figures (introduction by Claus Moser). The Economist Books, fourth reprint, paperback edition, October 1992. Contains a section, "Consumer Durables", with estimates of household ownership of a wide range of consumer durables in OECD and East European countries.
