= Nelu Bulanin =

Nelu Bulanin, also known as Upacara Nelu Bulanin and Niskramana Samskara, is a traditional ceremony held in Bali, Indonesia. The ceremony commemorates an infant baby who has reached three months, per the Pawukon calendar, or 105 days of age. The name "Nelu Bulanin" is from the Balinese language, "Nelu" or "Telu" meaning three and "Bulan" meaning month.

== Description ==
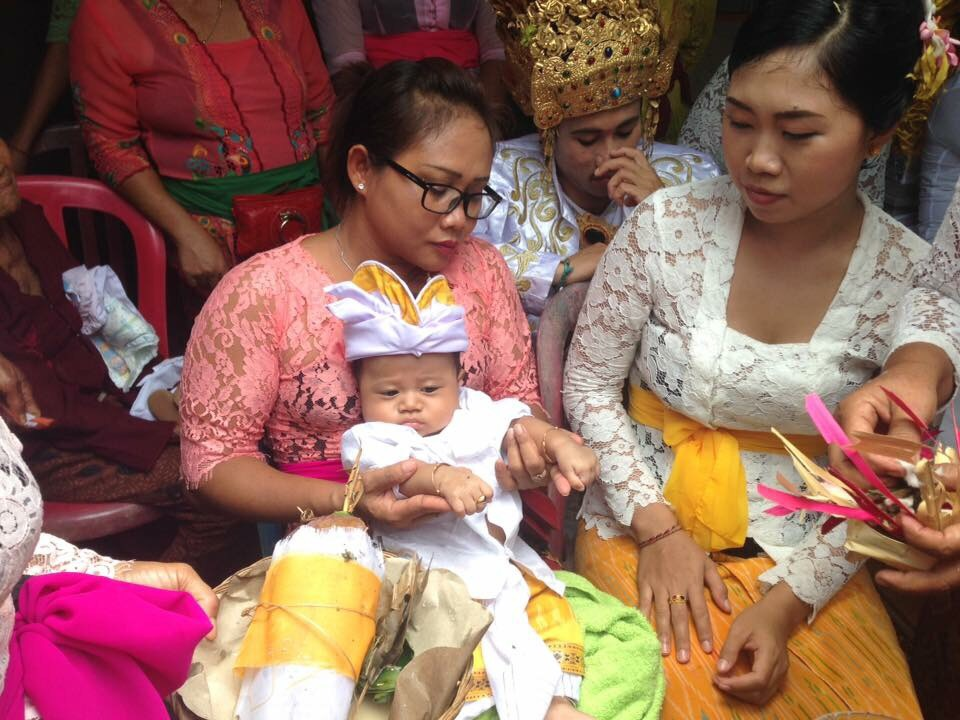
Nelu Bulanin Ceremony in 2016

Hinduism is common among locals of Bali, with various local customs. The purpose of Nelu Bulanin is to purify a baby; the Balinese believe that the first three months are a crucial stage of a baby's development. At this age, babies begin to actively engage their five senses. It is believed that this development can affect their soul and that Nelu Bulanin keeps the baby's soul pure.

There are two types of ceremonies - the Upacara Kecil (minor ceremony) and the Upacara Besar (major celebration). The Upacara Kecil is more traditional than Upacara Besar. It includes five stages: Panglepasan (discharge, release, or redemption), Penyambutan (welcoming), Jejanganan, Banten kumara, and Tataban. The Upacara Bescar adds three components to what is included in the smaller Upacara Kecil: Pula gembal, Banten panglukatan, and Banten Turun Tanah.

Nelu Bulanin is usually completed before the baby reaches six months of age. The ceremony is led by a Pandita or Pinandita — a mentor or guide — and it can be held in the family's home.

== Procedures ==
The ceremony includes six steps:

1. Tirtha panglukatan: Pandita/Pinandita
2. Pandita/Pinandita worships by sprinkling tirtha on both the offerings and the baby
3. If the baby wears jewelry, the item is first sprinkled with tirtha
4. Prayers for the baby are performed by the paternal grandmother and the Pandita/Pandita
5. Baby is given tirtha pengening (tirtha amertha) and then fed
6. Baby is given natab Sajan ayaban (a speech), praying for its safety

== Mantras and their meanings ==
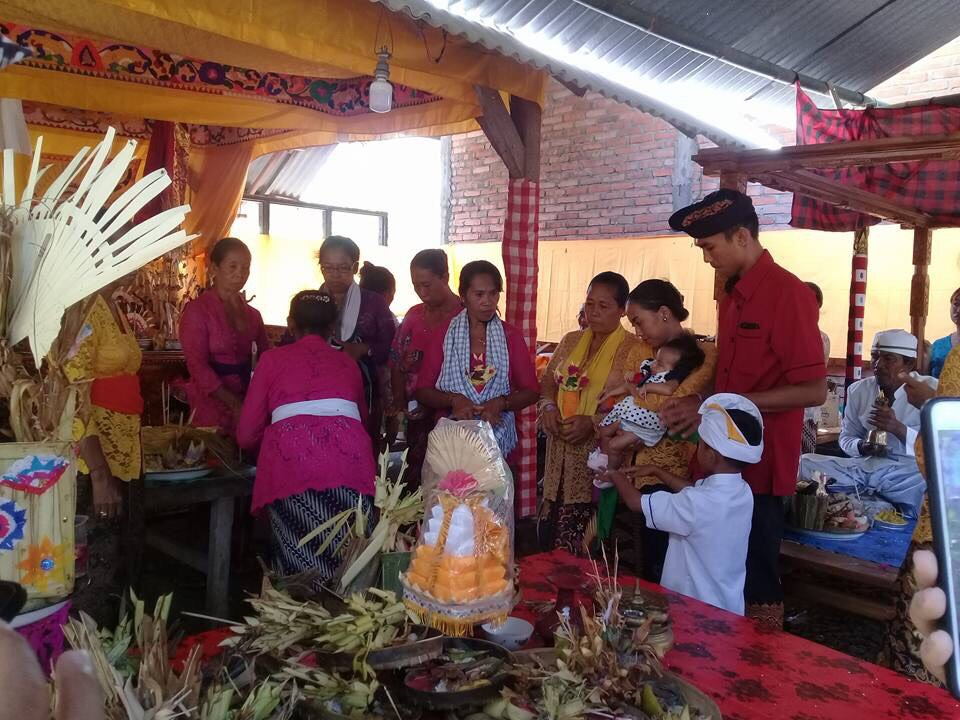
Nelu Bulanin Ceremony in 2016

Each event in the ceremony has its own mantra:

=== Panglepas’s mantra ===
Mantra: ukulun Bhatara Bhrahma, Bhatara Wisnu, Bhatara lswara, manusanira si anu (nama anak) anglepas aon, ipun ribatara tiga, pukulun anyuda leteh ipun, teka sudha, teka sudha, teka sudha, lepas malanipun.

Meaning: Om Hyang Widhi Wasa in manifestation as Bhatara Brahma, ishnu, Swara. Cleanse thy servant's defilement so he becomes holy and free from misery or suffering.

Mantra: Pukulun kaki sambut, nini sambut, tanedanan sambut agung tanedanan sambut alit, yen lunga mangetan, mangidul, mangalor, mangulon, mwang maring tengah, atmane si jabang bayi, tinututan dening pawatek dewata, pinayungan kala cakra, pinageran wesi, sambut ulihakena atma bayu premanane si jabang bayi maka satus delapan, amepeki raga sariranipun.

Meaning: Om Hyang Widhi Wasa in manifestation, welcome this, without exception welcomes big and small, allow me to beg if the spirit of the baby might go to East, South, West, North, and be in the Middle, to always get protection from Gods. Return the perfection of the baby's spirit to his body.

=== Simbul tanam’s mantra ===
Mantra: Om sang wawu pade wawu anak ira si tunggul ametung putunira sikarang jarat, sira anak-anakan watu, sira anak-anakan antiga, ingusan anak-anakan manusa.

Meaning: Om Hyang Widhi Wasa, your son is the one who is with you and your grandson who is growing and healthy, is a seed that is expected to be useful in the future.

=== Natab banten, and welcoming mantra ===
Mantra: Pukulan Kaki Prajapati, Nini Prajapati, Kaki Citragotra, Nini Citragotri, ingsun aneda sih nugraha ring kita sambuta, ulapi atmane si anu (nama anak) manawi wenten atmanipun angati ring pinggiring samudra, ring tengahing udadi, ndaweng ulihakena ring awak nia si anu (sebut nama anak), depun tetap mandel kukuh, pageh aweta urip. Om ayu werdhi, yasa werdhi pradnya suka sriyah dharma santana wredisca, santute sapta wredhayah.

Meaning: Om Hyang with Wasa in manifestation as Kaki Prajapati, Nini Prajapati, Kaki Citragotra, Nini Citragotri (four siblings: tuba water, mucus/lambdas, uranium, blood) I ask before You for a life that is physically and mentally prosperous, a long life kept away from illness and danger.

=== Menginjak tanah’s mantra ===
Mantra: Pukulun Kaki Citragotra, Nini Citragotri, ingsung minta nugraha nurunaken rare ring lemah, turun ayam ameng-ameng sarwa kencana sri sedana, katur ring Bhatari Mangkurat, Bhatari Wastu, Bhetari Kedep makadi Kaki Citragotra, Nini Citragotri, iki aturanipun srahatan aweta urip waras, dirgha yusa, tan keneng geget, wewedinan, asung ana aweta urip, waras teguh timbul, abusana kulit, akulit tembaga, aotot kawat, abalung wesi, anganti atungkel bubungan, angantos batu makocok, ulihakena pramana nama maka satus dua lapan maring raga waluna nta si jabang bayi.

Meaning: Om Hyang Widhi Wasa, I beg for Your grace by using precious gold silver treasures to offer to You. This is the offering of servants to ask for physical and spiritual salvation.

== Nelu Bulanin Massal ==
There is a tradition related to Nelu Bulanin called Nelu Bulanin Massal. Starting in 1965, eighty families in Pekraman Kliki Village, Bali, perform this ceremony every three years. The governor of the village showed appreciation for this tradition because of its values of teamwork and solidarity.
