= Jeja-Pekka Roos =

Finnish sociologist

J. P. (Jeja-Pekka) Roos (born April 30, 1945, in Helsinki) is a Finnish sociologist and former President of the European Sociological Association. Before his retirement, he was a professor in social policy at the University of Helsinki.

Roos studied in the University of Chicago, and taught at UCLA, University of Geneva, EHESS in Paris, University of Minnesota.

His main research areas are Evolutionary sociology, generations, especially the baby boomers' generation, life stories and autobiographies, human rights in child protection, the social impact of mobile phones, intellectuals, well-being and ways of life in Finland in relation to social policy and social structure. He has published more than 200 scientific books and articles.

In the 1980s and 1990s he worked with the comparative use of the life story approach, in particular in Russia, the Baltic and Northern Europe, and the question of men's life (and life stories) in Finland. He has participated in the organization of several autobiographical collections for the "ordinary people" and used this material in his work. His best known theoretical contribution is a typology of Finnish generations in the 20th century. Another is the concept of happiness barrier, which denotes the tendency to present one's life as much happier than it really is.

In 2006 he started a Finnish project (with European comparative data) about the interactions between the baby boomer generation with both its parents and children. He has also become interested in theory of evolution and evolutionary sociology, and has been President of the Darwin Society in Finland. He is also known as a supporter and defender of Tatu Vanhanen and Richard Lynn's controversial research on race and IQ.

Roos is a full member of the Finnish Academy of Sciences from 1995. He has translated and introduced Pierre Bourdieu's Questions de sociologie, into Finnish.

At younger age, Roos was known as a communist supporting the Soviet system, but resigned from the Communist Party of Finland in the early 1980s.

== Sources ==
- Kuka kukin on 2008. Otava 2008.
- Suomen Professorit (ed. by Leena Ellonen). Gummerus 2008
