= Claire Wallace (sociologist) =

British sociologist

Claire Denise Wallace
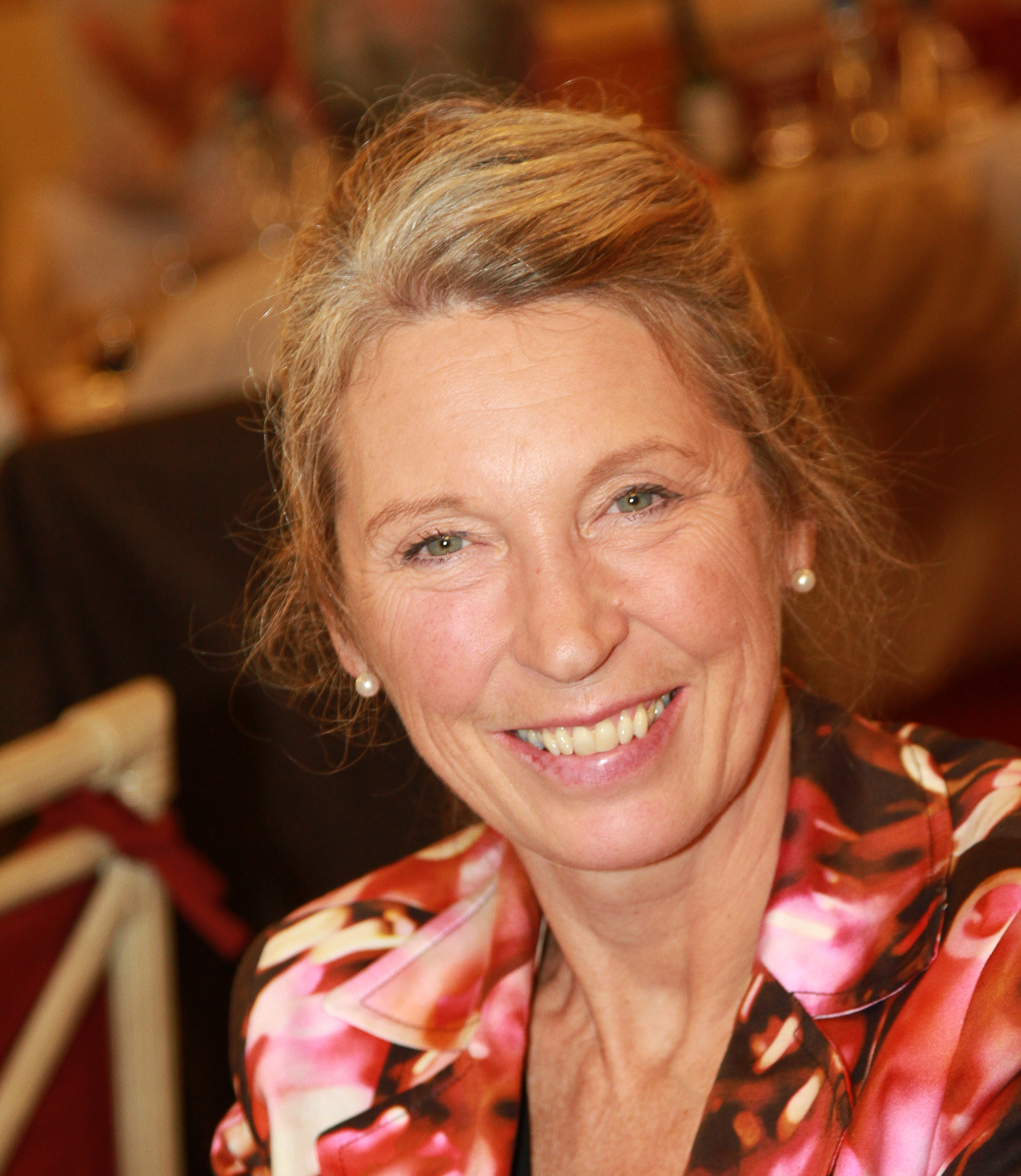
- Born: 4 December 1956
- Citizenship: British
- Education: University of Kent (BA Hons, PhD)
- Spouse: Christian Haerpfer
- Scientific career
- Fields: social quality, migration, gender, work and care, digital technology
- Institutions: University of Aberdeen; European Sociological Association; Institute for Advanced Studies; Central European University; University of Lancaster; University of Plymouth
- Thesis: School, work and unemployment: Social and cultural reproduction on the Isle of Sheppey (1985)
- Doctoral advisor: Ray Pahl

Claire Wallace is a professor of sociology at the University of Aberdeen.

Claire Wallace has published more than 100 peer-reviewed publications.

== Biography ==
Claire Wallace graduated from the University of Kent, where she undertook a PhD about young people on the Isle of Sheppey under the supervision of Ray Pahl. She subsequently worked at the University of Plymouth and Lancaster, before moving to Prague to help set up the Central European University (now in Budapest) together with Ernest Gellner. She then moved to the Institute for Advanced Studies in Vienna, where she later became Head of Sociology.

Since 2005 she has been working at the University of Aberdeen as Professor of Sociology, while she also was Vice-Principal for Research and Knowledge Exchange between 2011 and 2014 and before that Director of Research for the College of Arts and Social Science.

Between 2007 and 2009, she was President of the European Sociological Association. She was also editor in-chief of the international journal European Societies between 2001 and 2006.

== Work ==
Claire Wallace started her career on the Sheppey project with Ray Pahl looking at the transformations of work and employment for young people and households. She developed the idea of household work strategies in her later work in various European Union projects where she looked at all forms of work (domestic, employment, informal economy etc.) and how they were changing. This, together with her work on young people's transitions into adulthood, formed the basis of her early books. Whilst in Prague she became interested in East–West migration and published a series of papers and a book on this topic. She also wrote a series of papers about aspects of transition in Eastern Europe including ones on health, ethnic identity, work and well-being, as well as being involved in a series of project including ENRI-East, Health in Transition Times (HITT), Living Conditions, Lifestyles, and Health (LLH), Households, Work and Flexibility, and Workcare: Social Quality and the Changing Relationship between Work, Care and Welfare in Europe. These were continued through various research projects whilst in Vienna and Aberdeen. Since moving to Aberdeen she became co-investigator in the dot.rural Digital Economy Hub funded by the UK Research Council, where she looked at digital transformations of rural life. Over the last ten years she has been creating a model of well-being, quality of life and what makes a decent society by developing the Social quality model.

== See also ==
- Social quality

== Key publications ==
- Cross, Malcolm; Wallace, Claire, eds. (1991). Youth in transition: Education, employment and training. Falmer.
- Abbott, Pamela; Wallace, Claire, eds. (1991). Gender, power and sexuality. Palgrave Macmillan. ISBN 9780333542774.
- Abbott, Pamela; Wallace, Claire (1992). Family and the new right (Pluto Perspectives). Open University Press.
- Ringer, Stein; Wallace, Claire (1992). Youth, family and citizenship. Open University Press.
- Ringer, Stein; Wallace, Claire (1994). Societies in transition: East-Central Europe today (Prague papers on social responses to transformation Volume I). Central European University.
- Ringer, Stein; Wallace, Claire (1994). Social reform in the Czech Republic (Prague papers on social responses to transformation). Prague Digital Arts.
- Wallace, Claire; Ringer, Stein, eds. (1995). New trends in social transformation. Vol. 3. Aldershot: Avebury.
- Wallace, Claire; Kovatcheva, Sijka (1998). Youth in society: The construction and deconstruction of youth in East and West Europe. Palgrave Macmillan. ISBN 0333652258.
- Helve, Helena; Wallace, Claire (2001). Youth, citizenship and empowerment. Ashgate Publishing Limited. ISBN 0754616460.
- Wallace, Claire; Stola, Darius, eds. (2001). Patterns of migration in Central Europe. Palgrave Schol. ISBN 0333801520.
