= List of countries by number of households =

== UN statistics ==
This is a list of countries by the number of household. The list includes households occupying housing units and excludes persons living inside collective living quarters, such as hotels, rooming houses and other lodging houses, institutions and camps.

Country	Current Population	Number In Household	Households	% 1 Member	% 2-3 Members	% 4-5 Members	% 6+ Members	Year
China	1,409,778,724	2.80	482,427,212	17.84	44.50	28.06	9.60	2023
India	1,425,775,850	4.57	294,292,700	4.11	27.31	41.64	26.94	2015
United States	330,662,999	2.49	125,736,353	27.89	49.49	18.81	3.81	2020
Indonesia	269,603,400	3.86	69,855,344	7.10	36.62	41.50	14.78	2017
Brazil	212,347,290	3.31	64,124,398	12.00	47.27	31.91	8.82	2010
Russia	146,748,590	2.58	56,771,478	25.97	50.83	19.55	3.65	2010
Japan	125,800,000	2.26	54,310,000	37.97	44.67	15.72	1.64	2020
Nigeria	206,139,587	4.90	42,057,041	11.51	25.53	27.86	35.10	2015
Germany	83,122,889	2.05	40,624,971	39.53	47.00	12.71	0.76	2011
Bangladesh	169,660,274	4.47	37,957,746	1.74	29.71	45.59	22.96	2014
Mexico	127,792,286	3.74	34,167,462	10.08	37.68	37.75	14.49	2015
Pakistan	220,892,331	6.80	32,462,785	1.08	12.88	25.16	60.88	2013
France	67,146,000	2.22	30,243,926	35.46	46.84	16.08	1.62	2015
United Kingdom	66,796,807	2.27	29,486,179	33.01	48.96	16.24	1.79	2011
Turkey	84,140,990	3.14	26,309,332	19.74	42.49	28.60	9.17	2023
Philippines	109,441,605	4.23	25,893,157	9.18	30.05	36.82	23.95	2017
Vietnam	96,483,981	3.78	25,503,951	7.28	36.25	43.44	13.02	2009
Italy	60,026,546	2.40	25,020,120	31.10	46.56	21.29	1.05	2011
Egypt	101,189,802	4.13	24,496,076	6.48	30.40	43.12	20.00	2014
Iran	83,955,821	3.49	24,056,109	8.48	49.13	37.86	4.53	2016
South Korea	51,583,722	2.18	23,650,555	40.81	40.98	17.36	0.85	2022
Ethiopia	100,829,000	4.61	21,850,103	7.52	27.01	32.00	33.47	2016
DR Congo	101,935,800	5.30	19,225,670	7.25	21.19	27.81	43.74	2013
Thailand	66,577,342	3.69	18,042,640	18.36	44.71	28.16	8.77	2010
South Africa	59,622,350	3.36	17,733,119	23.84	36.32	24.66	15.17	2016
Spain	47,329,981	2.69	17,565,288	19.06	53.40	25.56	1.98	2011
Ukraine	41,723,998	2.46	16,972,715	27.90	51.22	18.07	2.81	2007
Canada	38,246,955	2.45	15,618,491	28.20	49.59	19.20	3.02	2016
Colombia	50,372,424	3.53	14,282,545	11.13	42.41	34.80	11.66	2015
Argentina	45,376,763	3.26	13,925,275	17.60	42.33	28.95	11.12	2010
Poland	38,352,000	2.81	13,666,831	20.67	49.49	24.80	5.04	2011
Kenya	47,564,296	3.64	13,071,338	21.60	31.06	27.84	19.49	2015
Myanmar	54,817,919	4.22	12,978,359	5.35	33.49	39.14	22.01	2016
Tanzania	57,637,628	4.85	11,880,255	9.63	25.77	30.00	34.60	2015
Australia	25,598,869	2.50	10,220,186	24.34	49.95	22.44	3.27	2011
Uganda	41,583,600	4.53	9,170,821	13.68	25.30	28.75	32.26	2016
Ghana	30,955,202	3.49	8,862,356	25.88	30.34	25.30	18.48	2014
Peru	32,625,948	3.75	8,695,193	12.91	34.68	36.02	16.39	2012
Netherlands	17,531,181	2.23	7,874,258	35.11	45.53	18.01	1.35	2011
Sudan	42,996,555	5.59	7,691,174	5.06	20.66	26.80	47.48	2008
Malaysia	32,708,730	4.56	7,176,812	7.14	25.64	37.86	29.36	2000
Nepal	29,996,478	4.24	7,075,702	6.45	33.96	36.57	23.02	2016
Morocco	36,077,527	5.24	6,890,065	5.88	21.48	31.96	40.68	2004
Mozambique	30,066,648	4.37	6,885,971	9.85	30.96	30.10	29.09	2011
Romania	19,317,984	2.88	6,709,224	20.91	46.98	26.47	5.63	2011
Uzbekistan	34,529,473	5.24	6,586,983	5.26	18.90	33.62	42.22	1996
Venezuela	28,435,943	4.33	6,565,128	7.56	29.11	36.87	26.46	2001
North Korea	25,550,000	3.93	6,502,416	1.68	32.72	55.42	10.17	2008
Angola	31,127,674	4.82	6,463,847	10.81	23.90	28.46	36.83	2016
Chile	19,458,310	3.58	5,440,715	11.43	39.22	37.11	12.24	2002
Kazakhstan	18,815,536	3.50	5,381,052	14.57	38.32	30.97	16.14	2009
Madagascar	26,251,309	4.95	5,304,084	5.34	25.30	33.14	36.22	2011
Iraq	40,150,200	7.70	5,212,262	1.23	10.21	20.83	67.74	1997
Ivory Coast	26,453,542	5.09	5,197,095	12.18	24.73	25.87	37.22	2012
Belgium	11,539,878	2.36	4,883,743	30.87	48.31	18.70	2.12	2011
Cameroon	24,348,251	4.99	4,877,120	15.14	22.69	24.44	37.72	2011
Sweden	10,379,295	2.17	4,776,239	40.32	38.32	14.86	?	2020
Ecuador	17,611,528	3.78	4,659,382	12.12	35.91	35.49	16.48	2010
Yemen	29,825,968	6.67	4,469,863	1.87	14.68	23.66	59.79	2013
Czech Republic	10,699,142	2.40	4,465,680	27.28	51.34	20.37	1.02	2011
Greece	10,724,599	2.44	4,394,506	27.48	49.84	21.26	1.42	2011
Afghanistan	32,890,171	8.04	4,092,477	0.19	6.45	16.84	76.52	2015
Malawi	18,449,828	4.51	4,091,853	6.45	28.10	35.56	29.90	2015
Austria	8,935,112	2.27	3,933,516	36.34	44.52	17.06	2.08	2011
Niger	23,196,002	5.92	3,920,330	3.19	19.86	28.99	47.96	2012
Switzerland	8,632,703	2.21	3,901,112	37.51	43.64	17.23	1.62	2000
Portugal	10,295,909	2.66	3,876,822	18.91	56.47	22.68	1.93	2011
Zimbabwe	15,473,818	4.08	3,795,226	12.37	31.14	33.76	22.72	2015
Belarus	9,408,400	2.48	3,789,941	27.00	51.73	19.09	2.19	2009
Hungary	9,769,526	2.60	3,753,000	23.63	50.92	22.72	2.74	2011
Burkina Faso	21,510,181	5.92	3,630,745	6.64	19.51	27.40	46.46	2014
Cuba	11,193,470	3.14	3,568,550	13.73	49.55	30.23	6.50	2002
Guatemala	16,858,333	4.81	3,507,977	4.33	26.57	37.51	31.60	2015
Zambia	17,885,422	5.13	3,485,901	7.17	21.41	30.06	41.35	2013
Mali	20,250,833	5.81	3,484,826	3.11	20.29	30.32	46.28	2018
Cambodia	15,288,489	4.61	3,315,050	3.37	25.65	43.08	27.90	2014
Bolivia	11,633,371	3.53	3,295,144	20.34	34.82	27.64	17.20	2012
Dominican Republic	10,448,499	3.48	3,004,226	14.33	39.85	33.08	12.73	2013
Bulgaria	6,951,482	2.34	2,973,737	30.53	50.97	16.62	1.89	2011
Rwanda	12,663,116	4.26	2,973,056	8.15	30.76	34.88	26.20	2015
Israel	9,280,200	3.14	2,953,648	21.01	40.00	28.29	10.70	2008
Chad	16,244,513	5.78	2,811,841	7.73	18.49	25.67	48.11	2015
Haiti	11,743,017	4.29	2,735,164	9.43	31.10	32.93	26.54	2017
Finland	5,503,335	2.07	2,652,262	41.01	44.46	12.97	1.57	2010
Hong Kong	7,500,700	2.83	2,646,107	18.29	50.89	27.55	3.27	2016
Burundi	12,309,600	4.83	2,548,469	6.04	25.17	31.72	37.07	2016
Norway	5,374,807	2.22	2,426,071	39.58	40.73	18.13	1.56	2011
Serbia	6,926,705	2.88	2,405,804	22.33	44.81	26.19	6.67	2011
Benin	12,114,193	5.19	2,335,719	9.78	23.56	29.10	37.56	2018
Jordan	10,815,192	4.72	2,291,955	4.36	25.76	34.91	34.97	2017
South Sudan	13,249,924	5.95	2,227,637	4.33	15.68	26.87	53.12	2008
Azerbaijan	10,085,900	4.55	2,217,398	6.77	20.86	44.69	27.68	2009
Honduras	9,304,380	4.47	2,082,686	6.69	29.43	36.81	27.07	2012
Guinea	12,559,623	6.25	2,009,276	4.53	16.91	27.52	51.04	2012
Slovakia	5,460,136	2.80	1,948,989	20.83	47.99	26.99	4.20	2011
Senegal	16,705,608	8.66	1,928,689	6.92	11.47	15.48	66.13	2017
New Zealand	5,095,668	2.67	1,906,474	22.84	50.52	22.09	4.55	2013
Ireland	4,977,400	2.77	1,799,221	21.58	48.05	26.21	4.16	2011
Singapore	5,685,807	3.29	1,727,455	12.21	38.95	37.69	11.15	2010
Togo	7,706,000	4.55	1,693,139	15.65	26.22	27.69	30.45	2014
El Salvador	6,765,753	4.07	1,662,356	8.82	34.09	36.82	20.28	2007
Papua New Guinea	8,935,000	5.43	1,645,457	4.08	21.97	29.73	44.22	2000
Paraguay	7,252,672	4.63	1,565,626	8.09	27.32	33.15	31.44	2002
Kyrgyzstan	6,596,500	4.21	1,565,200	8.21	30.82	36.13	24.85	2012
Tajikistan	9,313,800	6.27	1,485,317	2.96	12.06	29.22	55.76	2012
Costa Rica	5,111,238	3.46	1,476,628	11.23	42.70	35.83	10.25	2011
Croatia	4,058,165	2.80	1,451,732	24.56	44.43	25.28	5.73	2011
Sierra Leone	8,100,318	5.90	1,373,151	4.00	15.87	30.74	49.38	2013
Nicaragua	6,527,691	4.92	1,326,800	4.59	26.37	35.96	33.08	2005
Congo	5,518,092	4.31	1,281,072	13.09	29.90	29.08	27.94	2011
Uruguay	3,530,912	2.78	1,269,537	23.52	47.68	23.37	5.43	2011
Laos	7,231,210	5.77	1,254,263	1.22	15.01	34.80	48.97	2005
Lithuania	2,794,870	2.32	1,204,383	34.71	45.40	18.00	1.89	2011
Puerto Rico	3,193,694	2.67	1,195,915	23.06	50.37	23.17	3.40	2010
Panama	4,278,500	3.67	1,165,778	14.66	38.02	31.26	16.06	2010
Central African Republic	5,633,412	4.91	1,148,086	13.50	28.08	23.94	34.48	1994
Georgia	3,716,858	3.34	1,113,542	17.48	39.28	30.60	12.64	2014
Liberia	4,568,298	4.95	923,685	9.67	24.81	28.74	36.78	2013
Moldova	2,640,438	2.89	914,026	22.64	43.62	27.87	5.87	2014
Jamaica	2,734,093	3.06	893,225	..	..	..	..	2011
Albania	2,845,955	3.30	862,512	9.95	48.08	32.51	9.45	2017
Slovenia	2,100,126	2.47	851,149	32.60	43.69	20.54	3.16	2015
Armenia	2,967,900	3.54	837,896	15.19	36.17	32.30	16.34	2016
Mongolia	3,348,124	4.32	774,771	6.61	28.72	40.34	24.33	2000
Latvia	1,898,400	2.58	736,370	26.47	49.93	19.72	3.88	2011
Botswana	2,374,698	3.52	673,860	27.89	32.32	20.48	19.31	2011
Lesotho	2,007,201	3.34	600,072	20.66	37.91	27.90	13.52	2014
Namibia	2,504,498	4.24	590,931	17.45	29.84	25.56	27.16	2013
Estonia	1,328,976	2.30	578,440	33.90	47.28	17.14	1.67	2011
Oman	4,445,262	8.02	554,430	10.62	19.07	18.37	51.94	2003
Gabon	2,176,766	4.10	531,230	22.42	28.48	22.50	26.60	2012
Trinidad and Tobago	1,366,725	3.29	415,308	19.21	39.79	29.36	11.64	2011
Mauritius	1,266,000	3.48	364,285	9.97	41.02	40.24	8.77	2011
Cyprus	875,900	2.75	318,823	18.72	52.55	25.82	2.92	2011
Gambia	2,335,504	8.23	283,790	8.39	12.96	17.23	61.42	2013
Luxembourg	626,108	2.41	259,519	32.30	44.15	21.45	2.10	2011
East Timor	1,299,412	5.27	246,665	6.41	20.61	29.59	43.40	2016
Swaziland	1,136,261	4.74	239,860	17.65	24.63	21.60	36.12	2007
China, Macao SAR	696,100	3.07	227,031	15.13	48.16	31.06	5.64	2016
Guyana	744,962	3.80	196,290	12.87	36.69	32.09	18.35	2009
Fiji	889,327	4.57	194,497	5.94	30.10	34.31	29.64	2014
Montenegro	621,873	3.21	193,488	18.13	39.58	33.35	8.94	2011
Malta	514,564	2.85	180,375	17.15	49.78	30.40	2.66	2011
Guadeloupe	395,700	2.30	172,304	34.52	47.03	16.42	2.03	2015
Suriname	590,100	3.94	149,741	14.97	32.77	31.85	20.41	2004
Comoros	758,316	5.37	141,171	4.91	22.92	28.71	43.46	2012
Bahamas	389,410	3.40	114,679	17.73	40.33	29.15	12.79	2010
Maldives	383,135	5.40	70,952	4.49	22.28	33.50	39.73	2017
Aruba	112,269	2.89	38,855	21.37	46.77	25.59	6.28	2010
Isle of Man	83,314	2.28	36,478	30.07	51.53	16.84	1.56	2016
Samoa	202,506	6.75	29,995	4.18	14.88	21.89	59.05	2016
Bermuda	64,054	2.26	28,314	34.09	48.39	15.81	1.70	2016
Liechtenstein	38,749	2.32	16,700	34.17	44.75	19.50	1.58	2010
