= European Sociological Association =

Professional association

The European Sociological Association (ESA) is an academic association of European sociologists with over 2800 members. It is a member of the Initiative for Science in Europe and the International Sociological Association.

== History ==
ESA was established in 1994-95. Subsequent to the collapse of the Soviet system in Europe, several groups of sociologists founded the European Sociological Association (ESA), which in 2013 had about 1800 individual members and 28 national organizations.

== Mission ==
ESA aims to facilitate sociological research, teaching and communication on European issues, to build networks between European sociologists and to give sociology a voice in European affairs. ESA publishes journals European Societies and European Journal of Cultural and Political Sociology as well as the ESA conferences. Bristol University Press publishing the Emotions and Society journal in association with the ESA Research Network on Sociology of Emotions.

== Presidents ==
The following persons have been presidents of the association:

- 1995-1997: Sylvia Walby, University of Leeds
- 1997-1999: Martin Kohli, European University Institute
- 1999-2001: Jiří Musil, Central European University
- 2001-2003: Yasemin Soysal, University of Essex
- 2003-2005: Jeja-Pekka Roos, University of Helsinki
- 2005-2007: Giovanna Procacci, University of Milan
- 2007-2009: Claire Wallace, University of Aberdeen
- 2009-2011: Anália Torres, Instituto Universitário de Lisboa
- 2011-2013: Pekka Sulkunen, University of Helsinki
- 2013-2015: Carmen Leccardi, University of Milan-Bicocca
- 2015-2017: Frank Welz, University of Innsbruck
- 2017-2019: Sue Scott, Newcastle University
- 2019-2021: Marta Soler Gallart, University of Barcelona
- 2021-2023: Lígia Ferro, University of Porto
- 2024-2026: Kaja Gadowska, Jagiellonian University
- 2026-2028: Ana Cristina Santos, University of Coimbra

== Conferences ==
The association organizes an international conference every second year. Each conference has a specific theme.
