= Social quality =

Concept in social science for understanding social processes

Social quality is a way of understanding society which is also relevant for social and public policy. Social quality looks at elements that should constitute a good or decent society. It contributes to the body of work concerned with understanding social progress going beyond GDP, taking into account the work of the Organisation for Economic Co-operation and Development and the European Foundation for the Improvement of Living and Working Conditions. Whilst most approaches have concentrated on the economics or psychology of well-being, social quality can help understanding the social conditions that enable human flourishing.

== Description ==
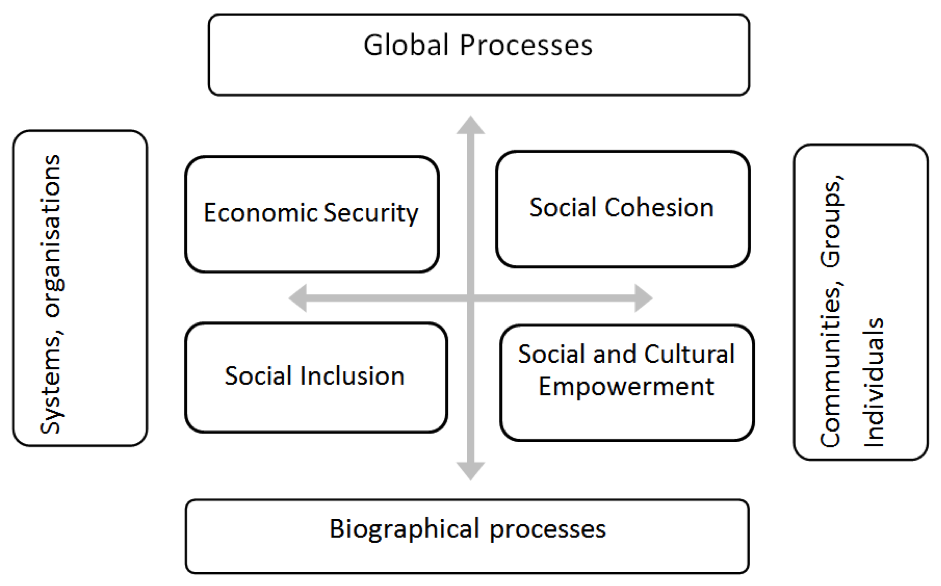
Social quality diagram

There are four elements shown in the diagram on the right. Economic security refers to the material conditions that enable people to have a long term perspective on their lives, and their confidence for the future. This can include social policies, such as pensions and social security, that ensure this. It also includes economic conditions that enable people to feel secure because they have enough income to cover their basic needs. Social cohesion refers to the bonds that link societies together, deriving from the work of Émile Durkheim. Émile Durkheim's work considers the moral and social relationships between members of society and social groups, including factors such as trust in others, trust in social institutions, a sense of identity, a collective consciousness, solidarity and commitment to the common good of society. Social inclusion refers to the way in which individuals and social groups are included into society, either through employment, networks and family or through access to social support of various kinds, this can come through support from other people or from social policies. Social policies that foster social inclusion, reduce poverty and tackle other forms of social exclusion can be important in this respect. Social empowerment refers to the conditions that enable people to participate in their society, such as having good health, education and democratic opportunities for participation, such as voting and joining civil society. However, it can also mean the feelings of being empowered, being able to take control of one's circumstances. It derives from the work of Amartya Sen, who suggests that people need to have the capability to be able to do the things that they wish to do.

However, the social quality approach is fundamentally relational. As such, it emphasises a complex field of conditional (i), constitutional (ii) and normative factors (iii). These are (i) Socio-Economic Security, Social Cohesion, Social Inclusion, Social Empowerment; (ii) Person/human security, Social Recognition, Social Responsiveness, Personal/human Capacity; and (iii) Social Justice (Equity), Solidarity, Equal Valuation, Human Dignity. On the one hand this rejects the Durkheimian view on society as an independent social fact sui generis; on the other hand it qualifies Sen's approach as social quality is not primarily focusing on the subjective side and individuals within society but on the constitution of society by way of people producing and reproducing their daily life and with this society.

== Origins and development ==
The idea of social quality began as a European Union project among a group of social scientists, concerned to develop a better way forward for social policies in Europe. Later the concept underwent some fundamental development. Empirically it had been developed amongst others by Pamela Abbott, Claire Wallace and Roger Sapsford, who looked at how the model can be developed empirically in Europe, Eastern Europe, Central Asia, China and Rwanda. They have used a different variation, considering the impact on well being, measured through life satisfaction and human flourishing in order to understand how social quality might work in fostering the well being of people in society.

== See also ==
- Eudaimonia – Greek word used as a translation for "human flourishing"
