= Premnaspirodiene oxygenase =

Class of enzymes

Identifiers
- EC no.: 1.14.14.151

Databases
- IntEnz: IntEnz view
- BRENDA: BRENDA entry
- ExPASy: NiceZyme view
- KEGG: KEGG entry
- MetaCyc: metabolic pathway
- PRIAM: profile
- PDB structures: RCSB PDB PDBe PDBsum
Search
- PMC: articles
- PubMed: articles
- NCBI: proteins

Premnaspirodiene oxygenase (EC 1.14.14.151, HPO, Hyoscymus muticus premnaspirodiene oxygenase) is an enzyme with systematic name (-)-vetispiradiene,NADPH:oxygen 2alpha-oxidoreductase. It catalyses the following overall chemical reaction:

vetispiradiene
2 O_{2}
3 H_{2}O
solavetivone

Premnaspirodiene oxygenase is a cytochrome P450 protein containing heme, isolated from Hyoscyamus muticus. It uses molecular oxygen for the oxidation, which proceeds in two steps via solavetivol, and requires a partner cytochrome P450 reductase for functional expression. This uses nicotinamide adenine dinucleotide phosphate.
