= Ray Pahl =

British sociologist

Raymond Edward Pahl (17 July 1935 – 3 June 2011) was a British sociologist, best known for his studies of social interaction, polarisation, work and friendship in suburban and post-industrial communities.

== Biography ==
He was born in London, and attended St Albans School before studying at St Catharine's College, Cambridge, and then the London School of Economics.

His doctoral thesis was completed at the London School of Economics, entitled "Urban influences on rural areas within the London metropolitan region: case studies of three Hertfordshire parishes". It studied class, community and social cohesion in Hertfordshire commuter villages, and was later published as Urbs in Rure. He was appointed as lecturer at the University of Kent at Canterbury in 1965, and to a personal chair in 1972. In the late 1970s, his exploratory study of the informal economy of the Isle of Sheppey developed into a major research project, which came to be known as the Sheppey Project, and as a result of which he published Divisions of Labour (1984). He also contributed in the 1980s to the Archbishop of Canterbury's report Faith in the City. He became president of Research Committee 21 of the International Sociological Association, and helped establish the Society and Politics Programme at the Central European University in Prague, continuing to work closely with sociologists in eastern Europe throughout the rest of his career.

In the late 1980s he helped set up the British Household Panel Study at the University of Essex, which gathers information from households across the UK for social and economic research. He transferred to the Institute of Social and Economic Research at Essex a few years later, being given the title of visiting research professor in sociology in 1999. In 2008, he was elected a fellow of the British Academy.

He died of cancer in 2011, aged 75.

== Bibliography ==
- Urbs in Rure (1965)
- Whose City? (1970)
- Patterns of Urban Life (1970)
- Managers and their Wives (1971)
- Divisions of Labour (1984)
- After Success: Fin de Siècle Anxiety and Identity (1995)
- On Friendship (2000)
- Rethinking Friendship: Hidden Solidarities Today (2006, with Liz Spencer)
