= High performance organization =

Conceptual framework for organizations

The high performance organization (HPO) is a conceptual framework for organizations that leads to improved, sustainable organizational performance. It is an alternative model to the bureaucratic model known as Taylorism. There is not a clear definition of the high performance organization, but research shows that organizations that fit this model all hold a common set of characteristics. Chief among these is the ability to recognize the need to adapt to the surroundings that the organization operates in. High performance organizations can quickly and efficiently change their operating structure and practices to meet needs. These organizations focus on long term success while delivering on actionable short term goals. These organizations are flexible, customer focused, and able to work highly effectively in teams. The culture and management of these organizations support flatter hierarchies, teamwork, diversity, and adaptability to the environment which are all of paramount success to this type of organization. Compared to other organizations, high performance organizations spend much more time on continuously improving their core capabilities and invest in their workforce, leading to increased growth and performance. High performance organizations are sometimes labeled as high commitment organizations.

== History ==
World War II ushered in a great amount of increased manufacturing and industrial production. With this came an increased concern over the human impact on work. The Hawthorne studies were part of the reason why more importance was placed on considering the human impact of work. During this period, industrial manufacturers followed the standardized large scale production method, characterized by mass production, scientific management, and stringent division of labor. This led to increased boredom among blue collar workers who would do the same repetitive job on a daily basis. Management in this period was characterized by careful and calculated monitoring which would cause workers to feel a sense of distrust. By the 1960s management for the industrial manufacturing industries had difficulty attracting and retaining its workforce. During the 1960s there was a push for job enrichment. This grew out of the sociotechnical systems approach to work, which was pioneered by the Tavistock Institute. This system is characterized by the open systems model and self-directed work team, which are also key to the success of a high performance organization. Research on the sociotechnical systems approach to work has shown that this approach is related to increased employee satisfaction and motivation.

Another important step towards the high performance organization was the Japanese Revolution in manufacturing, which pointed out another flaw to the scientific model of production. Because workers were so focused on only doing one monotonous task, they were not aware of the bigger picture. Most employees were completely unaware of the quality of the products that they were producing. The focus that Japanese manufacturing companies put on quality, through their early quality circles, eventually led to the implementation of total quality management which is a key factor of producing quality products that meet consumer demands at low price points. Another reason for the move away from the older, highly bureaucratic approach towards the high performance organization was the rapid change in the business environment since the 1980s.

The 1980s were characterized by a difficulty in American production due to increased competition from foreign firms, increased inflation on oil prices, and a decrease in productivity. This change was characterized by increased globalization, an increase in diversity in the workplace, large technological advances, and increased competition. To better meet the demands of the changing market place, organizations first tried to implement increased technological innovation in their production facilities in order to regain the competitive advantage. These companies soon came to realize that the human factor was also necessary in regaining its competitive footing. The realization of the importance of the human factors in work have led organizations to rely on the high performance organization to drive production and increase their employee's quality of work.

== Characteristics ==
=== Organizational design ===
High performance organizations value teamwork and collaboration as priorities in their organizational design. These organizations flatten organizational hierarchies and make it easier for cross-functional collaboration to occur. They do this by reducing barriers between functional units and getting rid of complex organizational bureaucracies. In an HPO, relationships are strengthened among employees who perform distinct functions, or that only perform within a given business silo. which improves organizational performance. This is particularly evident in organizations that exhibit highly interdependent work such as hospitals. High performance organizations value sharing of information at all levels by incentivizing information sharing in both bottom up and top down processes. The design is also very malleable and can adjust to both external and internal concerns.

=== Teams ===
The most apparent difference in the organizational design of HPOs is their reliance on teamwork. Teams operate semi-autonomously to set schedules, manage quality, and solve problems. These self-directed work teams thrive off of information sharing from all levels of the organization and are multi-skilled with the flexibility to solve problems without the need of direct supervision. Members of self-directed work teams have been shown to have greater job satisfaction, more autonomy and idea input, and improved work variety. These teams are often small in number, typically ranging from 7–15 members. Members of these teams share complementary skills and membership is often cross-functional. In order for these teams to truly operate at high performance, they must buy into the teamwork framework. Team members who are part of high performance teams tend to have strong personal commitment to one another's growth and success, and to the organizations growth and success. The high sense of commitment exhibited by teams in a high performance organization allow these teams to have a better sense of purpose, more accountability, and more actionable goals which allows them greater productivity. High performance teams move through the same stage development framework, which was popularized by Tuckman, as other teams. They must be guided by a competent leader through the stages until they are ready to truly operate at high performance.

=== Individuals ===
HPOs foster an organization of learning where they invest heavily in their workforce. They do this typically through leadership development and competency management. HPOs will develop a clear set of core competencies that they want the organization's employees to master. They will invest in keeping these competencies prominent through training and development. These organizations also reinvent the way they refer to their employees in order to place value on the team concept. Employee titles will reflect this. They will often be referred to as team members or associates as opposed to employees or staff. This again increases employee involvement and makes employees more committed to the larger goals and competencies that the organization places value in.

=== Leaders ===
The roles of managers in an HPO are also reinvented. Traditional models for organizations would have leaders closely monitor or supervise their teams. Team leaders in HPOs are more concerned with long term strategic planning and direction. They take a more hands off approach and their titles reflect this change in responsibility. Leaders in HPOs trust in their employees to make the right decisions. They act as a coach to their team members by giving them support and keeping them focused on the project at hand. These leaders are able to lead depending on the situation and have the capability to adjust their leadership style based upon the needs of their team members. They know when to inspire people with direct communication and also have the ability to read when a more hands off approach is necessary. Although these leaders act with a hands-off approach, they hold non-performers accountable for not reaching their goals.

Leadership practices are also in line with the company's vision, values, and goals. Leaders of these organizations make all of their decisions with the organization's values in mind. Leadership behavior that is consistent with the organization's vision involves setting clear expectations, promoting a sense of belonging, fostering employee involvement in decision making, and encouraging learning and development.

Leaders in an HPO also have the responsibility of understanding and being able to quickly make important decisions about the always changing marketplace in which their organization operates. Leaders should have the ability to anticipate changes in competition, technology, and economics within their market.

=== Organization strategy and vision ===
HPOs create strong vision, value, and mission statements which guide their organizations and align them with the outside environment. The mission, vision, and values of the organization act as foundations on which the organization is built. They inform employees what is rewarded and also what is not. HPOs implement vision statements that are specific, strategic, and carefully crafted. Leaders propagate the vision at all levels by ensuring that activities are aligned with vision and strategy of the organization. HPOs also set lofty, but measurable and achievable goals for their organization in order to guide their vision. The vision and strategy of the organization is made clear to employees at all levels. A common understanding of the organizations strategy and direction creates a strategic mind-set among employees that helps the organization achieve its goals.

=== Innovative practices ===
HPOs reward and incentivize behavior that is in line with the organizations goals. They implement reward programs that aim to benefit employees who follow the values of the organization.

HPOs streamline information sharing across all levels of the organization. Information sharing is streamlined via communications channels set up with state of the art information technology. Internal communication is interactive and open exchange is rewarded. Typically, HPOs implement innovative ICT networks within their organization. While HPOs do streamline their information, they also share information across all levels of the organization to make sure that everyone is sharing in the same vision. An HPO is constantly improving their products, manufacturing processes, or services in order to gain a competitive advantage. These organizations focus on the efficiency of all aspects of their product. They implement various process and quality optimization models such as total quality management, Lean Six Sigma, quality circles, process re-engineering, and lean manufacturing.

HPOs have innovative human resources practices. For example, employees may be involved in the hiring process. All team members may be involved when hiring a new member to join that team. Human resources may also implement pay for knowledge or pay for skill programs where employees are monetarily rewarded for attending training sessions that further their skills and abilities. Generally, there is a more focused approach on training where specific skills are targeted by the organization through data collection and needs assessment. These skills are the focus of the training and development programs that are implemented by human resources. It is typical for these organizations to have an internal learning and organizational development team which dedicates its time to conducting skill and competency based needs assessments and then training employees where it is needed.

=== Flexibility and adaptability ===
The success of HPOs are due to their ability to have structures in place that allow them to quickly adjust to the environment that they operate within. HPOs have the ability to reconfigure themselves to meet the demands of the marketplace and avoid its threats. HPOs constantly survey and monitor the environment to understand the context of their business, identify trends, and seek out any competitors. A HPO's growth is facilitated by creating partnerships and creating networks with other organizations after careful examination of the value added by entering into these relationships. They have high external orientation and strive to meet customer demands. They meet and exceed customer demands by fostering close relationships with customers, understanding their customers' values, and being responsive to their customers' needs. HPOs maintain relationships with their stakeholders by creating mutual relationships.
